= List of shipwrecks in December 1943 =

The list of shipwrecks in December 1943 includes ships sunk, foundered, grounded, or otherwise lost during December 1943.

== 1 December ==
List of shipwrecks: 1 December 1943
Ship	State	Description
HMT Avanturine	Royal Navy	World War II: The damaged naval trawler (296 GRT, 1930) was under tow when she was torpedoed and sunk in the English Channel off Beachy Head, Sussex by S 142 (Kriegsmarine). All 24 crew were killed.
DB-35 and DB-39	Soviet Navy	The No. 1-class landing boats were lost on this date.
F 573	Kriegsmarine	World War II: The Type C2 Marinefährprahm was sunk by an air attack in the port of Kamysch Burun, Crimea.
Konei Maru	Japan	World War II: Convoy 1272: The cargo ship was torpedoed and sunk in the Pacific Ocean (01°16′N 146°45′E) by USS Peto (United States Navy) with the loss of 39 crew.
Nichiryo Maru	Japan	World War II: Convoy 2612: The cargo ship was torpedoed and sunk in the Celebes Sea (01°28′N 120°53′E) by USS Bonefish (United States Navy). Six passengers, one guard and 18 crew were killed.
Oil barge no. 35	Japan	Convoy No. 5233: The oil barge, being towed by Nankai Maru No. 2 (Imperial Japanese Navy), was abandoned in the Pacific Ocean between Kwajalein and Truk after her towline broke during the night.
SF 263	Kriegsmarine	World War II: The Siebel ferry was bombed and damaged beyond repair by Allied fighter-bomber aircraft at Drvenik, Croatia, with the loss of 18 lives.
Shoko Maru	Imperial Japanese Navy	World War II: Convoy 3123: The Peacetime Standard D type auxiliary transport (1,933 GRT 1939) was torpedoed and sunk in the Pacific Ocean 280 nautical miles (520 km; 320 mi) west north west of Guam (18°02′N 138°55′E) by USS Pargo (United States Navy). All 42 crew were killed.
Teiren Maru	Japan	World War II: The cargo ship was bombed and damaged at Hong Kong (23°13′N 114°05′E) by North American B-25 Mitchell aircraft of the United States Fourteenth Air Force. The ship was beached and was consequently declared a total loss.

== 2 December ==
List of shipwrecks: 2 December 1943
Ship	State	Description
Ardito	Regia Marina	World War II: Air Raid on Bari: The minesweeper was bombed and sunk at Bari, Italy by Luftwaffe aircraft.
Assam	Japan	World War II: The paddle steamer was bombed and damaged on the Irrawaddy River, Burma by Bristol Beaufighter aircraft of the Royal Australian Air Force. She was bombed and sunk the next day by North American B-25 Mitchell aircraft of the United States Army Air Force.
Barletta	Regia Marina	World War II: Air Raid on Bari: The auxiliary cruiser was bombed and sunk at Bari by Luftwaffe aircraft. There were 40 dead and 44 wounded.
Bollsta	Norway	World War II: Air Raid on Bari: The cargo ship (1,832 GRT, 1924) was bombed and sunk at Bari by Luftwaffe aircraft with the loss of five of her 30 crew. She was raised in 1948, repaired and entered Italian service as Stefano M.
Cassala	Italy	World War II: Air Raid on Bari: The cargo ship bombed and damaged at Bari by Luftwaffe aircraft. She was declared a constructive total loss.
Corfu	Italy	World War II: Air Raid on Bari: The cargo ship bombed and damaged at Bari by Luftwaffe aircraft. She was declared a constructive total loss.
Devon Coast	United Kingdom	World War II: Air Raid on Bari: The coaster (646 GRT, 1936) was bombed and sunk at Bari by Luftwaffe aircraft.
F 566	Kriegsmarine	World War II: The Type C2 Marinefährprahm was torpedoed and sunk in the Black Sea off Eupatoria (45°11′N 35°56′E) by D-4 Revolutsyoner or Shch-209 (both Soviet Navy). All 12 crew were rescued.
Fort Athabasca	Canada	World War II: Air Raid on Bari: The Fort ship (7,132 GRT, 1943) was bombed and sunk at Bari by Luftwaffe aircraft.
Fort Lajoie	Canada	World War II: Air Raid on Bari: The Fort ship (7,134 GRT, 1943) was bombed and sunk by the Luftwaffe at Bari.
Frosinone	Italy	World War II: Air Raid on Bari: The cargo ship was bombed and sunk at Bari by Luftwaffe aircraft. She was subsequently refloated and scrapped.
Genespesca II	Italy	World War II: Air Raid on Bari: The cargo ship was bombed and sunk at Bari by Luftwaffe aircraft.
Goggiam	Italy	World War II: Air Raid on Bari: The cargo ship bombed and damaged at Bari by Luftwaffe aircraft. She was declared a constructive total loss.
Hermann	Kriegsmarine	World War II: The patrol boat ran aground and sank in Norwegian waters. She was later salvaged, repaired and served as the Vorpostenboot V-6107 Hermann.
Himalaya Maru	Japan	World War II: The hospital ship was bombed and sunk in the South China Sea (0°52′S 148°50′E) by United States Army Air Force aircraft.
Inaffondabile	Italy	World War II: Air Raid on Bari: The schooner was bombed and sunk at Bari by Luftwaffe aircraft.
John Bascom	United States	World War II: Air Raid on Bari: The Liberty ship was bombed and sunk at Bari by Luftwaffe aircraft. The wreck was scrapped in 1948.
John Harvey	United States	John Harvey World War II: Air Raid on Bari: The Liberty ship was bombed and sunk at Bari by Luftwaffe aircraft. 10 gunners and four crew killed. The wreck was scrapped in 1948.
John L. Motley	United States	World War II: Air Raid on Bari: The Liberty ship was bombed, blew up and sank at Bari by Luftwaffe aircraft. All on board were killed, 22 gunners and 42 crew.
Joseph Wheeler	United States	World War II: Air Raid on Bari: The Liberty ship was bombed, blew up and sunk at Bari by Luftwaffe aircraft. All on board were killed; one passenger, 13 gunners and 15 crew. The wreck was scrapped in 1948.
Koki Maru	Japan	World War II: The cargo ship struck a mine and sank in the Pacific Ocean off Macau
Lars Kruse	United Kingdom	World War II: Air Raid on Bari: The cargo ship (1,807 GRT, 1923) was bombed and sunk at Bari by Luftwaffe aircraft with the loss of 19 of her 33 crew.
HMS LCA 553	Royal Navy	The landing craft assault (9/12 t, 1943) was sunk in collision with LCF 24 (Royal Navy) near Bourn Gap Buoy, off Southampton. There were no injuries.
USS LCT-242	United States Navy	World War II: The landing craft tank was wrecked off Naples, Italy, possibly by a circling torpedo, and was beached. There were 16 killed and one wounded.
Lom	Norway	World War II: Air Raid on Bari: The cargo ship (1,268 GRT, 1920) was bombed and sunk at Bari by Luftwaffe aircraft with the loss of four of her 32 crew.
Luciano Orlando	Italy	World War II: Air Raid on Bari: The cargo ship was bombed and sunk at Bari by Luftwaffe aircraft.
Lwów	Poland	World War II: Air Raid on Bari: The cargo ship was bombed and sunk at Bari by Luftwaffe aircraft.
MB 10 13	Regia Marina	World War II: Air Raid on Bari: The boat was bombed and sunk at Bari by Luftwaffe aircraft.
Nitsa	Greece	World War II: The cargo ship (4,732 GRT, 1915) was torpedoed and sunk by I-27 (Imperial Japanese Navy) in the Gulf of Aden (11°42′N 45°32′E). Eleven of her 40 crew were killed.
Norlom	Norway	World War II: Air Raid on Bari: The Design 1105 ship (6,326 GRT, 1919) was bombed and sunk at Bari by Luftwaffe aircraft. Five crew were killed during the raid or died in the next days. She was refloated in November 1946 and scrapped at Bari in 1947.
Porto Pisano	Italy	World War II: Air Raid on Bari: The coaster was bombed and sunk at Bari by Luftwaffe aircraft.
Puck	Poland	World War II: Air Raid on Bari: The cargo ship was bombed and sunk at Bari by Luftwaffe aircraft.
Samuel J. Tilden	United States	World War II: Air Raid on Bari: The Liberty ship was bombed and sunk at Bari by Luftwaffe aircraft. There were 17 troops and ten crew killed. The wreck was scrapped in 1948.
Testbank	United Kingdom	World War II: Air Raid on Bari: The cargo ship (5,083 GRT, 1937) was bombed and sunk, or was sunk by John L. Motley (United States) blowing up at Bari during an air raid by Luftwaffe aircraft. Seventy of her 74 crew were lost.
Volodda	Italy	World War II: Air Raid on Bari: The cargo ship bombed and sunk at Bari by Luftwaffe aircraft.

== 3 December ==
List of shipwrecks: 3 December 1943
Ship	State	Description
Azuma Maru	Imperial Japanese Navy	World War II: The Azuma Maru-class emergency auxiliary oiler was torpedoed and sunk in the Molucca Passage (06°34′N 131°40′E) by USS Tinosa (United States Navy). Her captain, 49 crew and 18 passengers were killed.
Touchet	United States	World War II: The Type T2-SE-A2 tanker was torpedoed and sunk in the Gulf of Mexico (25°50′N 86°30′W) by U-193 (Kriegsmarine) with the loss of ten gunners. Eleven survivors were rescued by USS Falgout (United States Navy), and 43 by Lillemor (Norway) on 5 December. USS Raven (United States Navy) rescued the remaining 16 survivors on 6 December.

== 4 December ==
List of shipwrecks: 4 December 1943
Ship	State	Description
Asakaze Maru	Imperial Japanese Navy	World War II: The Koshin Maru-class auxiliary collier/oiler was sunk at Kwajalein Atoll by US Navy aircraft. There were 19 crew killed.
Chūyō	Imperial Japanese Navy	World War II: The Taiyō-class escort carrier was torpedoed and sunk in the Pacific Ocean (31°55′N 143°40′E) by USS Sailfish (United States Navy). A total of 730 passengers and 513 crew were killed. Sazanami and Urakaze (both Imperial Japanese Navy) rescued 160 survivors. 20 of 21 survivors from USS Sculpin (United States Navy) on board were also lost.
Daido Maru	Imperial Japanese Navy	World War II: The auxiliary gunboat was sunk north of Ponape (08°22′N 159°02′E) by USS Apogon (United States Navy).
Hiyoshi Maru	Imperial Japanese Navy	World War II: Convoy No. 3201: The Shunko Maru-class auxiliary transport ship (4,049 GRT 1937) was torpedoed and sunk in the Pacific Ocean about 280 nautical miles (520 km; 320 mi) northeast of Chichi-Jima, east of Honshū (29°36′N 145°54′E) by USS Gunnel (United States Navy) with the loss of 38 crew. Survivors were rescued by Inazuma (Imperial Japanese Navy).
Kembu Maru	Imperial Japanese Navy	World War II: The auxiliary transport (6,816 GRT 1943) (a.k.a. Tatebu Maru) was damaged at Kwajalein Atoll by US Navy aircraft and sank the next day (09°00′N 166°30′E). It resulted in 19 crewmen killed.
Libertad	Cuba	World War II: Convoy KN 280: The cargo ship was torpedoed and sunk in the Atlantic Ocean (34°12′N 75°20′W) by U-129 (Kriegsmarine) with the loss of 25 of her 43 crew. Survivors were rescued by the convoy escorts, including USS Natchez (United States Navy).
Mikuni Maru No. 5	Imperial Japanese Navy	World War II: The guard ship was sunk at Kwajalein Atoll by aircraft based on USS Lexington and USS Independence (both United States Navy).
S 511	Kriegsmarine	World War II: The MAS boat was bombed in the Aegean Sea off Levitha Island by Bristol Beaufighter aircraft and capsized and sank off Makronisos. Two men were killed.
Takunan Maru No. 7	Imperial Japanese Navy	World War II: The auxiliary submarine chaser was sunk at Kwajalein Atoll by US Navy aircraft. Five crew were killed.
Tateyama Maru	Imperial Japanese Navy	World War II: The auxiliary water ship was sunk at Kwajalein Atoll by US Navy aircraft. Five crew were killed.

== 5 December ==
List of shipwrecks: 5 December 1943
Ship	State	Description
Asakaze Maru	Japan	World War II: The collier was bombed and sunk at Kwajalein, Marshall Islands (9°19′N 167°25′E) by United States Navy aircraft based on USS Essex and USS Lexington (both United States Navy) with the loss of most of her crew.
Choko Maru	Imperial Japanese Navy	World War II: The Genkai Maru-class auxiliary transport ship (3,515 GRT 1939) was bombed 1.5 nautical miles (2.8 km) north of Little Bustard Island (Orobeppu), Kwajalein by Douglas SBD Dauntless dive bombers based on USS Lexington and USS Independence (both United States Navy). She sank the next day. Four crew were killed.
F 305	Kriegsmarine	World War II: The Type B Marinefährprahm was sunk by an air attack in the port of Kamysch Burun, Crimea. There were no casualties.
F 369 Donau	Kriegsmarine	World War II: The Type A Marinefährprahm was sunk by an air attack in the port of Kamysch Burun, Crimea. There were no casualties.
Himeno Maru	Japan	World War II: The coaster was shelled and sunk in Alajacar Bay off Camiguin, Philippines (09°09′N 124°29′E) by USS Narwhal (United States Navy).
Mikuni Maru No. 5	Imperial Japanese Navy	World War II: The guard boat was bombed and sunk by US Navy carrier aircraft at Kwajalein, Marshall Islands.
No. 3	Soviet Navy	World War II: Kerch-Eltigen Operation: The pontoon was sunk by shelling by MFPs in the Black Sea.
No. 103	Soviet Navy	The G-5-class motor torpedo boat was lost on this date.
RTSh-398	Soviet Navy	World War II: Kerch-Eltigen Operation: The minesweeper was sunk by shelling by MFPs in the Black Sea.
Takunan Maru No. 7	Imperial Japanese Navy	World War II: The auxiliary submarine chaser was bombed and sunk by US Navy carrier aircraft at Kwajalein, Marshall Islands.
Tatiyama Maru	Imperial Japanese Navy	World War II: The Tatiyama Maru-class auxiliary water tanker (3,787 GRT 1937) was bombed and sunk by US Navy carrier aircraft 16 nautical miles (30 km; 18 mi) off East Rochi Reef, Kwajalein, Marshall Islands (09°00′N 166°30′E). Five crew were killed.

== 6 December ==
List of shipwrecks: 6 December 1943
Ship	State	Description
Virgilio	Germany	World War II: The troopship was torpedoed and damaged in the Mediterranean Sea off Toulon, Var, France by HMS Uproar (Royal Navy). She put in to Toulon, where she was declared a total loss.

== 7 December ==
List of shipwrecks: 7 December 1943
Ship	State	Description
Faron	Vichy France	World War II: The tug was torpedoed and sunk in the Mediterranean Sea by Orphée (Free French Naval Forces).
Mar Bianco	Germany	World War II: The cargo ship was bombed and sunk by Allied aircraft at Zadar, Yugoslavia.
No. 96	Soviet Navy	The G-5-class motor torpedo boat was lost on this date.
RTShch-105	Soviet Navy	World War II: Kerch-Eltigen Operation: The K-15/M-17-class minesweeping boat was sunk by MFPs in the Black Sea off Eltigen. All six crew were killed, and probably all troops aboard too, up to 80 men.
SKA-031 and SKA-0141	Soviet Navy	Kerch-Eltigen Operation: The patrol boats ran aground in the night due to bad weather. Later managed to free themselves.
Soyo Maru	Imperial Japanese Navy	World War II: Convoy 4205B: The Ryoyo Maru-class auxiliary converted collier/oiler was torpedoed in the Pacific Ocean 430 miles (690 km) north east of Truk by USS Pogy (United States Navy), she sank the next day at (13°30′N 15°20′E). Seven civilian refugee passengers and 35 crew were killed.

== 8 December ==
List of shipwrecks: 8 December 1943
Ship	State	Description
Colombia	Panama	World War II: The cargo ship was torpedoed and sunk in the Caribbean Sea 20 nautical miles (37 km) north of San Blas Point (9°50′N 78°55′W) by U-516 (Kriegsmarine) with the loss of four of her 27 crew.
F 514	Kriegsmarine	World War II: The Type C Marinefährprahm was bombed and sunk during an air raid on Porto San Stefano port. One crew was wounded.
HMS LCP(L) 136	Royal Navy	The landing craft personnel (large) (6/8 t, 1942) was lost on this date.
HMT Rysa	Royal Navy	World War II: The Isles-class trawler (545/770 t, 1941) struck a mine and sank in the Mediterranean Sea off La Maddelena, Sicily, Italy with the loss of 19 crew.
Sansei Maru	Imperial Japanese Navy	World War II: The Santo Maru-class auxiliary transport (3,234 GRT 1931) was torpedoed and damaged in the Pacific Ocean 27 nautical miles (50 km) east north east of Iwo Jima (25°20′N 141°46′E) by USS Sawfish (United States Navy). There were no casualties. She was towed to Iwo Jima and unloaded and then went to Chichi Jima. Derequisitioned 5 February 1944, she broke in two and sank while still under repair 12 March 1944.

== 9 December ==
List of shipwrecks: 9 December 1943
Ship	State	Description
Cap Padaran	United Kingdom	World War II: Convoy HA 11: The troopship (8,009 GRT, 1922) was torpedoed and sunk in the Mediterranean Sea north east of Cape Spartivento, Italy (39°15′N 17°30′E) by U-596 (Kriegsmarine) with the loss of five of her 197 crew. Survivors were rescued by HMT Sheppey (Royal Navy).
F 580	Kriegsmarine	World War II: The Type C2 Marinefährprahm was torpedoed and sank when cargo of ammunition exploded in the Black Sea 20 miles (32 km) off Ak-Mechet, Crimea (45°29′N 32°19′E) by S-31 (Soviet Navy). All 12 crew were killed.
No. 29	Soviet Navy	The No. 19-class landing tender was lost on this date.
R-56	Kriegsmarine	World War II: The Type R-41 minesweeper was sunk by Soviet aircraft north of Norway. She was later raised and repaired.
Sanko Maru	Imperial Japanese Army	World War II: The Tenryu Maru-class auxiliary transport was shelled and sunk in Hitokappu Bay, Etorofu Island, Kuriles.
Sonja	Germany	World War II: The cargo ship was torpedoed and sunk in the Mediterranean Sea off Kynthos, Greece by HMS Surf (Royal Navy).

== 10 December ==
List of shipwrecks: 10 December 1943
Ship	State	Description
DB-503	Soviet Navy	World War II: Kerch-Eltigen Operation: The landing boat was sunk by German shore batteries, or by mines, in the Black Sea off the beachhead of Mount Mithridates.
No. 35	Soviet Navy	World War II: Kerch-Eltigen Operation: The No. 11-class landing tender was sunk by a mine off the beachhead of Mount Mithridates with all hands.

== 11 December ==
List of shipwrecks: 11 December 1943
Ship	State	Description
HMS Cuckmere	Royal Navy	World War II: Convoy KMS 34: The River-class frigate (1,445/2,165 t, 1943) was torpedoed and damaged in the Mediterranean Sea off Bougie, Algeria by U-223 (Kriegsmarine) with the loss of 16 crew. She was towed into Algiers but was declared a total loss.
Lynghaug	Norway	The cargo ship ran aground at Preston, Lancashire, United Kingdom. She was refloated, but later declared a constructive total loss. She was sunk as an artificial breakwater off Arromanches on 10 June 1944.
V 602 Richard C. Krogmann	Kriegsmarine	World War II: The vorpostenboot was sunk off the Charente Estuary, France by two mines dropped by Royal Air Force aircraft.
Suffolk	United States	The cargo ship foundered and sank in a heavy gale about 20 miles (32 km) south of Montauk Point, Long Island (40°43′N 71°58′W) with the loss of all 42 men (merchant sailors and gunners).

== 12 December ==
List of shipwrecks: 12 December 1943
Ship	State	Description
Herma Gorthon	Sweden	The cargo ship ran aground on the Negrillos Reef, off the coast of Colombia. She was refloated on 10 January 1944 but was declared a constructive total loss. She was sold in October 1944, repaired and returned to service.
HMS Holcombe	Royal Navy	World War II: Convoy KMS 34: The Hunt-class destroyer (1,087/1,490 t, 1942) was torpedoed and sunk in the Mediterranean Sea off Bougie, Algeria (37°20′N 5°30′E) by U-593 with the loss of 84 of her 164 crew. Survivors were rescued by USS Niblack (United States Navy).
Île d'Aix	Germany	World War II: The cargo ship was sunk at Bremen during an American air raid.
M 5206 Gnom	Kriegsmarine	The minesweeper collided with another vessel and sank in Oslofjord.
Mars	Germany	World War II: The cargo ship was severely damaged at Bremen during an American air raid.
Tosei Maru	Japan	World War II: The cargo ship was torpedoed and sunk in the Flores Sea (2°44′N 126°14′E) by USS Tuna (United States Navy).
HMS Tynedale	Royal Navy	World War II: Convoy KMS 34: The Hunt-class destroyer (1,000/1,340 t, 1940) was torpedoed and sunk in the Mediterranean Sea off Jijel, Algeria (37°10′N 6°05′E) by U-593 (Kriegsmarine) with the loss of 73 of her 155 crew. Survivors were rescued by Hengist (United Kingdom) and HMS Hyderabad (Royal Navy).
V 6106 Tirol	Kriegsmarine	World War II: The Vorpostenboot was sunk in Varangerfjord (70°06′N 30°26′E) by Soviet Navy torpedo boats, or by mines. 24 of her 59 crew were killed.
Valery Chkalov	Soviet Union	The Liberty ship broke in two in the Pacific Ocean (54°22′N 164°04′E). Both sections were salvaged and the ship was repaired and returned to service.
USS YCK-8	United States Navy	The open lighter foundered in the Atlantic Ocean off Key West, Florida.

== 13 December ==
List of shipwrecks: 13 December 1943
Ship	State	Description
Friedrich Bischoff	Germany	World War II: The cargo ship was bombed and sunk at Bremen by Royal Air Force aircraft. She was later salvaged, repaired and returned to service.
Fukkai Maru	Japan	World War II: The cargo ship was torpedoed and sunk in the Pacific Ocean off Palau by USS Pogy (United States Navy).
R 306	Kriegsmarine	World War II: The minesweeper was bombed and set on fire at Kiel during an American air raid, and then scuttled to avoid an explosion. She was raised on 5 February 1944 but was then scrapped.
South Coaster	United Kingdom	The Admiralty-chartered cargo ship ran aground in the River Exe in the Exe Estuary in Devon. The crew remained aboard in hopes of being pulled off. Eight days later she was hit by a severe gale during which her crew was taken off, the ship was pulled off but then beached and abandoned after being stripped.
T15	Kriegsmarine	World War II: The Type 37 torpedo boat was bombed and sunk by aircraft while docked at the Deutsche Werke yard in Kiel.
Tokiwa Maru	Japan	World War II: The cargo ship was torpedoed and sunk in the Pacific Ocean off New Ireland by Consolidated PBY Catalina aircraft of the United States Navy.
Totai Maru	Imperial Japanese Army	World War II: Convoy O-302: The cargo ship was torpedoed in the Pacific Ocean south of Kyushu (30°25′N 132°32′E) by USS Sailfish (United States Navy). Her cargo of incendiary bombs caught fire setting off high explosive bombs, sinking her. Three passengers, 12 gunners and 22 crewmen were killed.
U-172	Kriegsmarine	World War II: The Type IXC submarine was depth charged and sunk by Grumman TBF Avenger and Grumman F4F Wildcat aircraft based on USS Bogue and also by USS Clemson. USS Du Pont, USS George E. Badger and USS Osmond Ingram (all United States Navy) with the loss of 13 of her 59 crew.
U-345	Kriegsmarine	World War II: The Type VIIC submarine was severely damaged by bombs in the Howaldtswerke shipyard at Kiel during an American air raid ad was decommissioned on 23 December 1943. She foundered while under tow on 2 February 1944 in the Baltic Sea north of Warnemünde (54°20′N 12°04′E). The wreck was raised in April 1953 and broken up at Stralsund.
U-391	Kriegsmarine	World War II: The German Type VIIC submarine was depth charged and sunk in the Bay of Biscay north west of Cape Ortegal, Spain (45°45′N 9°38′W) by a Consolidated B-24 Liberator aircraft of 53 Squadron, Royal Air Force with the loss of all 51 crew.
U-593	Kriegsmarine	World War II: The Type VIIC submarine was depth charged, shelled and sunk in the Mediterranean north of Algiers, Algeria (37°38′N 5°58′E) by HMS Calpe (Royal Navy) and USS Wainwright (United States Navy). All 51 crew survived and were rescued by USS Wainwright.

== 14 December ==
List of shipwrecks: 14 December 1943
Ship	State	Description
Daisy Moller	United Kingdom	World War II: The cargo ship (4,087 GRT, 1911) was torpedoed and sunk in the Bay of Bengal by Ro-110 (Imperial Japanese Navy). The lifeboats were rammed and shelled, killing 55 of the 127 crew.
Hakozaki Maru	Japan	World War II: The cargo ship was torpedoed and sunk in the Pacific Ocean by USS Herring (United States Navy).
Netztender 44 Prudente	Kriegsmarine	World War II: The net tender was torpedoed and sunk in Monaco harbor by HMS Untiring (Royal Navy).
USS PT-239	United States Navy	The PT boat burned in Lambu Lambu Cove, Vella Lavella, Solomon Islands (07°42′N 156°47′E).

== 15 December ==
List of shipwrecks: 15 December 1943
Ship	State	Description
Aquileia	Kriegsmarine	World War II: The hospital ship was attacked by Allied aircraft at Marseille, Bouches-du-Rhône, France. She was set afire and ran aground.
Borgsten	Norway	The cargo ship (1,569 GRT, 1922) collided with Pinguin (Germany) and sank off Bastøy Island, Norway. Raised in 1947, repaired and re-entered service in 1949.
Genmei Maru	Japan	World War II: Convoy KAI-13: The cargo ship was bombed and damaged off Timor by Dutch Army North American B-25 Mitchell aircraft. She was scuttled by shore batteries the next day. Four passengers, ten gunners and eight crew were killed.
Nevada	United States	Nevada The cargo ship was abandoned in the Atlantic Ocean off the coast of South Carolina with the loss of 34 of her 63 crew. Survivors were rescued by the cutter USCGC Comanche ( United States Coast Guard). Nevada foundered on 18 December.
Senkai Maru	Japan	World War II: The cargo ship was bombed and sunk in the Gulf of Tonkin off the coast of French Indochina by North American B-25 Mitchell aircraft of the United States Fourteenth Air Force.
UJ-102	Kriegsmarine	World War II: The auxiliary submarine chaser, a converted Type KT cargo ship, blew up and sank with all 53 hands in the Black Sea off Eupatoria. At the time, she was dropping depth charges on or near the wreck of Santa Fé (Germany), possibly detonating gasoline or munitions in the wreck, or being sunk by the explosion of one of her own depth charges.

== 16 December ==
List of shipwrecks: 16 December 1943
Ship	State	Description
Admiral Brommy	Germany	World War II: The accommodation ship was sunk at Bremen during a British air raid.
Ginyo Maru	Japan	World War II: Convoy No. 227: The Ginyo Maru-class cargo ship was torpedoed and sunk by USS Flying Fish (United States Navy) 50 nautical miles (93 km; 58 mi) south west of Takao. 118 passengers, three gunners and 66 crew were killed.
Gyokurei Maru	Japan	World War II: Convoy TAMA-24: The Kinrei Maru-class ore carrier was torpedoed and sunk in the Pacific Ocxan (26°30′N 128°15′E) by USS Grayback (United States Navy). 62 crew were killed.
McDowell	United States	World War II: The Type T2-SE-A2 tanker was torpedoed and sunk in the Caribbean Sea 30 nautical miles (56 km) north of Aruba, Netherlands Antilles (13°08′N 70°02′W) by U-516 (Kriegsmarine) with the loss of three of her 73 crew. Survivors were rescued by Fairfax (United States) and USS YMS-56 (United States Navy).
R 54	Kriegsmarine	World War II: The Type R-41 minesweeper was sunk by a mine north west of Anholt, Denmark (56°47′N 11°12′E). The whole crew was rescued.
HMS Rose Valley	Royal Navy	The naval drifter/inspection vessel (100 GRT, 1918), being used as a torpedo transport, sank in a collision off Scapa Flow (58°47′N 03°47′W).
U-73	Kriegsmarine	World War II: The Type VIIB submarine was depth charged, shelled and sunk in the Mediterranean Sea off Oran, Algeria by USS Edison, USS Trippe and USS Woolsey (all United States Navy) with the loss of 16 of her 48 crew.
Vienti	Finland	World War II: The cargo ship was sunk at Bremen during a British air raid.
Vulcan	Germany	World War II: The tug was sunk at Bremen during a British air raid.
USS YP-426	United States Navy	The patrol boat ran aground and sank east of Tybee Island, Georgia (31°59′N 80°48′W).

== 17 December ==
List of shipwrecks: 17 December 1943
Ship	State	Description
USS APc-21	United States Navy	World War II: The coastal transport was bombed and sunk by Japanese dive bombers off Arawe, New Britain (06°15′S 149°01′E). All 25 crew were rescued.
Kingswood	United Kingdom	World War II: The cargo ship (5,080 GRT, 1929) was torpedoed and sunk in the Gulf of Guinea south west of Cotonou, French West Africa (5°57′N 1°43′E) by U-515 (Kriegsmarine). All 48 crew survived.
Wakatsu Maru	Imperial Japanese Army	World War II: Convoy KAI-13: The transport ship was bombed, blew up and sunk off Timor by Bristol Beaufighter aircraft of the Royal Australian Air Force. There were 14 troops and six crew killed.
Wakatu Maru	Japan	World War II: The cargo ship was attacked by Dutch aircraft and sank in the Philippine Sea (8°26′S 126°48′E).

== 18 December ==
List of shipwrecks: 18 December 1943
Ship	State	Description
Arno	Kriegsmarine	World War II: The cargo ship was torpedoed and badly damaged in the Bay of Concarneau, Brittany, France by Bristol Beaufighter aircraft of Coastal Command, Royal Air Force. Ten crew were wounded. She sank under tow in bad weather on 21 December off Brest.
Christopholis	Greece	World War II: The cargo ship was torpedoed and sunk in the Mediterranean Sea off Makronisos by ORP Sokół (Polish Navy).
HMS Felixstowe	Royal Navy	World War II: The Bangor-class minesweeper (673/860 t, 1941) was sunk in the Mediterranean Sea off Capo Ferro, Sardinia, Italy (41°10′N 09°40′E) by a mine. There were no casualties.
Gyokurei Maru	Japan	World War II: Convoy No. 227: The cargo ship was torpedoed and sunk in the East China Sea (26°30′N 128°15′E) by USS Grayback (United States Navy). There were 62 crew killed.
La Foce	Italy	World War II: The cargo ship was torpedoed and sunk in the Mediterranean Sea by HMS Universal (Royal Navy). There were 18 killed and 31 survivors.
Numakaze	Imperial Japanese Navy	World War II: Convoy No. 227: The Minekaze-class destroyer was torpedoed and sunk in the East China Sea 50 miles (80 km) east north east of Naha, Okinawa 26°29′N 128°26′E by USS Grayback (United States Navy). The day after her bow broke off. The vessel was lost with the death of all 148 crew.
SF 193	Kriegsmarine	World War II: The Siebel ferry was damaged by HMS MTB 637 (Royal Navy), and went aground where she was attacked by Partizans. Six crew were killed, 11 reported missing and 29 later rescued. Possibly salvaged and put in Partizan service.

== 19 December ==
List of shipwrecks: 19 December 1943
Ship	State	Description
Alaska Maru	Imperial Japanese Army	World War II: Convoy No. N-206: The Alaska Maru-class transport was bombed and damaged in the Pacific Ocean 30 nautical miles (56 km) north of the Gazelle Peninsula, off Kavieng, New Ireland by Consolidated PBY Catalina aircraft of the United States Navy and Consolidated B-24 Liberator aircraft of the United States Army Air Force. One crewman was killed. She sank the next day (03°45′N 151°21′E). Survivors were rescued by CH-37 (Imperial Japanese Navy).
James Withycombe	United States	The Liberty ship ran aground off Cristóbal, Colón, Panama (8°58′N 79°32′W). She broke in two and was abandoned as a constructive total loss.
Kaito Maru	Japan	World War II: Convoy No. N-206: The cargo ship was bombed and damaged in the Pacific Ocean 30 nautical miles (56 km) north of the Gazelle Peninsula, off Kavieng, New Ireland by Consolidated PBY Catalina aircraft of the United States Navy. A total of 262 troops and 26 crew were killed. She sank the next day (04°35′N 151°21′E). Survivors were rescued by CH-37 (Imperial Japanese Navy).
HMS LCP(R) 753, HMS LCP(R) 771 and HMS LCP(R) 795	Royal Navy	The landing craft personnel (ramped) (6/8 t, 1942) were lost on this date.
Selma	Germany	The cargo ship was severely damaged by an explosion of ammunition at Nesodden, Norway. She was towed out of port, but exploded and sank on 1 January 1944.
Shoei Maru	Imperial Japanese Navy	World War II: The transport, a World War I British Type C standard cargo ship, (3,083 GRT 1919) was bombed and heavily damaged at Kwajalein Atoll by Consolidated B-24 Liberator aircraft. Five crew were killed. She sank the next day.
Zora	Greece	World War II: The Greek caique was sunk with demotion charges from HMS Sportsman (Royal Navy) after its crew was taken off.

== 20 December ==
List of shipwrecks: 20 December 1943
Ship	State	Description
USCGC Bodega	United States Coast Guard	The patrol vessel became stranded while attempting to rescue the crew of James Withycombe (United States), and was subsequently abandoned. There was no casualty.
Fernando L. de Ybarra	Spain	The cargo ship was driven ashore at Peniche, Portugal in a storm and was wrecked with the loss of 23 of her 33 crew.
Fuyō	Imperial Japanese Navy	World War II: Convoy No. 782: The Wakatake-class destroyer was torpedoed and sunk in the South China Sea off Subic Bay, Philippines (14°45′N 119°54′E) by USS Puffer (United States Navy).
HMS LCM 33	Royal Navy	The landing craft mechanized (21/35 t, 1940) was lost on this date.
Phemius	United Kingdom	World War II: The cargo ship (7,406 GRT, 1921) was torpedoed and sunk in the Gulf of Guinea 30 nautical miles (56 km) south of Accra, Gold Coast (5°01′N 0°47′E) by U-515 (Kriegsmarine) with the loss of 23 of the 116 people on board. Survivors were rescued by Commandant Drogou (French Navy).
Tsuneshima Maru	Japan	World War II: Convoy No. 1182: The cargo ship was torpedoed and sunk in the Pacific Ocean north of the Bismarck Archipelago, Papua New Guinea (01°26′N 148°36′E) by USS Gato (United States Navy). Her whole crew was rescued.
U-850	Kriegsmarine	World War II: The Type IXD2 submarine was depth charged, torpedoed and sunk in the Atlantic Ocean (32°54′N 37°01′W) by Grumman TBM Avenger and Grumman F4F Wildcat aircraft based on USS Bogue (United States Navy) with the loss of all 66 crew.

== 21 December ==
List of shipwrecks: 21 December 1943
Ship	State	Description
Aspherat	Netherlands	World War II: The cargo ship (5,759 GRT, 1928) was torpedoed and sunk by German aircraft east of Malta (36°16′N 16°58′E). All 65 crew and 23 passengers were rescued.
Carentan	Free French Naval Forces	The CH-5-class submarine chaser (107/137 t, 1939) foundered in a storm in the La Manche. There were 20 crew (17 French and three British) deaths and six survivors.
Kashiwa Maru	Imperial Japanese Navy	World War II: Convoy OKI-904: The Kashiwa Maru-class auxiliary minesweeper (515 GRT 1938) was torpedoed and sunk in the Pacific Ocean about eight nautical miles (15 km; 9.2 mi) south west of Kuchinoerabujima, Satsunan Islands (30°24′N 119°53′E) by USS Grayback (United States Navy). The vessel was lost with all crew, including the survivors of Konan Maru (at least 107 men).
Konan Maru	Japan	World War II: Convoy OKI-904: The cargo ship was torpedoed and sunk in the Pacific Ocean about eight nautical miles (15 km; 9.2 mi) south west of Kuchinoerabujima, Satsunan Islands (30°26′N 129°58′E) by USS Grayback (United States Navy). There were 69 crew, three gunners and 576 of her 683 passengers killed. Kashiwa Maru rescued the survivors but was sunk with all hands, including the rescued survivors shortly later, also by Grayback.
HMS LCA 645 and HMS LCA 646	Royal Navy	Both landing craft assault (8.5/11.5 t, 1943) were lost in heavy sea off Eddystone Lighthouse.
Norhauk	Norway	World War II: the cargo ship (6,038 GRT, 1919) struck a mine and sank in the Thames Estuary (51°50′03″N 1°33′01″E) with the loss of 11 of her 41 crew. The wreck was subsequently dispersed by explosives.
Terukawa Maru	Imperial Japanese Navy	World War II: The Terukawa Maru-class fleet oiler was torpedoed and sunk in the Pacific Ocean off the Caroline Islands (09°45′N 152°00′E) by USS Skate (United States Navy). An unknown number of passengers and 12 crew were killed. Survivors were rescued by Amagiri (Imperial Japanese Navy).
Uyo Maru	Japan	World War II: Convoy O-106: The cargo ship was torpedoed and sunk in the Bungo Channel by USS Sailfish (United States Navy). She was carrying 950 men of the 202nd Naval Construction Unit, and 192 were killed.

== 22 December ==
List of shipwrecks: 22 December 1943
Ship	State	Description
HMS BV 42	Royal Navy	The Parkgate-class guard ship (275 t, 1918) was sunk by an explosion at Leith, Lothian. Seven crew were killed.
Ginrei Maru	Japan	World War II: The Kinrei Maru-class ore carrier was bombed and sunk in the South China Sea 105 nautical miles (194 km) south of Hong Kong (12°12′N 130°40′E) by North American B-25 Mitchell aircraft of the United States Fourteenth Air Force.
Havelland	Germany	World War II: The cargo ship was torpedoed and damagedeast of Kashinosaki, Japan (33°30′N 135°57′E) by USS Gurnard (United States Navy). She was subsequently towed in to a Japanese port. Acquired by the Imperial Japanese Navy in 1944 and entered service as the submarine tender Tatsumiya Maru.
HMS LCP(R) 613, HMS LCP(R) 661 and HMS LCP(R) 1035	Royal Navy	The landing craft personnel (ramped) (6/8 t, 1943) were lost on this date.
HMS LCP(S) 116	Royal Navy	The landing craft personnel (small) (3/5.5 t, 1943) was lost on this date.
Maria	Germany	World War II: The coaster was sunk by TK-13 (Soviet Navy) with all hands.
Niobe	Kriegsmarine	World War II: The Gazelle-class light cruiser was torpedoed and sunk by HMMTB 276 and HMMTB 298 (both Royal Navy) off Silba, Yugoslavia after running aground on 19 December. The wreck was scrapped post-war.
TK-14	Soviet Navy	World War II: The D-3-class motor torpedo boat was sunk by shelling by M 365 and V 6108, (both Kriegsmarine) and then was rammed by V 6108. Five crew were taken as prisoners of war by V 6115.
UJ 6076 Volontaire	Kriegsmarine	World War II: The naval trawler/submarine chaser was torpedoed and sunk in the Mediterranean Sea south of Cap Sicié by Casabianca (Free French Naval Forces) with the loss of 29 lives.

== 23 December ==
List of shipwrecks: 23 December 1943
Ship	State	Description
Balkan	Bulgaria	World War II: The cargo ship was torpedoed and sunk in the Mediterranean Sea off Mudros, Greece (39°44′N 25°16′E) by HMS Sportsman (Royal Navy). There were 3 dead and 68 survivors.
MTB 357	Royal Navy	World War II: The motor torpedo boat (40/47 t, 1943) was shelled and damaged by German surface ships, and foundered the next day in the North Sea.
Nankai Maru No. 2	Imperial Japanese Navy	World War II: The Peacetime Standard Type D auxiliary transport was bombed and sunk at Mili Atoll, Marshall Islands, (06°05′N 171°43′E) by Douglas SBD Dauntless dive bombers of the United States Navy.
Nanyo	Imperial Japanese Navy	World War II: The Nanyo-class gunboat, a former Chinese Ho-class customs cruiser, was bombed and sunk in the South China Sea at Matsu Island, off Foochow (26°10′N 119°55′E) by North American B-25 Mitchell aircraft of the United States Fourteenth Air Force.
Peshawur	United Kingdom	World War II: The cargo ship (7,934 GRT, 1919) was torpedoed and sunk in the Bay of Bengal (11°11′N 80°11′E) by Ro-111 (Imperial Japanese Navy). All aboard (master, 124 sailors and 9 gunners) were rescued by the minesweeping sloop HMAS Ipswich (Royal Australian Navy).
Raduga	Soviet Navy	World War II: The auxiliary minesweeper was sunk by a mine off Seskar Island in the Baltic Sea. There were 56 dead and 10 survivors.
Raimo-Ragnar	Finland	The cargo ship ran aground south of Nygrundet, Sweden, and was later destroyed by storms. There was no casualties.
Scotia	United States	Carrying a cargo of hundreds of cases of beer, the 2,649-ton steam cargo ship was stranded off Alcan Cove (52°43′45″N 174°04′30″E) on Shemya Island in the Aleutian Islands. She broke in two and sank in January.
Viking		The oil vessel burned seven miles (11 km) east of Grayton Beach, Florida.
HMS Worcester	Royal Navy	World War II: The W-class destroyer (1,120/1,508 t, 1922) struck a mine in the North Sea and was severely damaged. Declared a constructive total loss, she spent the rest of the war as an accommodation ship.

== 24 December ==
List of shipwrecks: 24 December 1943
Ship	State	Description
Antone	United States	After her rudder broke, the motor vessel ran aground on the south-central coast of the Territory of Alaska 1.5 nautical miles (2.8 km; 1.7 mi) south of Barabara Point (59°29′10″N 151°38′30″W). She became a total loss, but all 13 people on board survived.
Dumana	United Kingdom	World War II: Convoy STL 8: The seaplane tender (8,427 GRT, 1923) straggled behind the convoy. She was torpedoed and sunk in the Atlantic Ocean 70 nautical miles (130 km) south west of Sassandra, Côte d'Ivoire (4°27′N 6°58′W) by U-515 (Kriegsmarine) with the loss of 39 of the 169 people on board. Survivors were rescued by HMT Arran and HMT Southern Pride (both Royal Navy). Dumana was on a voyage from Port-Étienne, Mauritania to Takoradi, Gold Coast.
Hans Christophersen	Germany	The cargo ship (2,034 GRT, 1921) was wrecked four nautical miles (7.4 km; 4.6 mi) south of Sælgrund, Denmark. Also reported as a war loss, striking a mine and sinking in the Gulf of Bothnia.
Heiwa Maru	Japan	World War II: The cargo ship was torpedoed and sunk in the Morotai Strait by USS Raton (United States Navy).
HMS Hurricane	Royal Navy	World War II: The H-class destroyer (1,350/1,860 t, 1940) was torpedoed and damaged in the Atlantic Ocean by U-415 (Kriegsmarine) with the loss of three of her 152 crew. She was scuttled the next day by HMS Watchman (Royal Navy).
I-39	Imperial Japanese Navy	World War II: The Type B1 submarine was depth charged and sunk in the Pacific Ocean off Lunga Point, Guadalcanal by USS Griswold (United States Navy) (or sunk by USS Boyd (United States Navy) on 26 November 1943 60 nautical miles (110 km) south west of Tarawa).
USS Leary	United States Navy	World War II: The Wickes-class destroyer was torpedoed and sunk in the Atlantic Ocean by U-275 (Kriegsmarine) with the loss of 97 of her 176 crew. Survivors were rescued by USS Schenck (United States Navy).
HMS ML 1388	Royal Navy	World War II: Convoy STL 8: The Harbour Defence Motor Launch (44/52 t, 1943) was wrecked at Hartlepool, County Durham.
Nicoline Maersk	Germany	World War II: The cargo ship was attacked by the destroyer Le Fantasque (Free French Naval Forces) off Tortosa, Spain and was deliberately run ashore at Sant Carles de la Ràpita, Spain. She was declared a total loss.
Seizan Maru No.2	Imperial Japanese Navy	World War II: Convoy No. 8222-Toko: The Peacetime Standard Type D auxiliary transport ship was torpedoed and sunk about one point five nautical miles (2.8 km; 1.7 mi) north east of Mikizaki, Mie Prefecture, Homshu, Japan (34°03′N 136°19′E) by USS Gurnard (United States Navy). 28 crew were killed.
Tohuku Maru	Imperial Japanese Army	World War II: Convoy No. 8222-Toko: The transport was torpedoed and sunk in the Pacific Ocean about one point five nautical miles (2.8 km; 1.7 mi) north east of Mikizaki, Mie Prefecture, Honshu, Japan (34°03′N 136°19′E) by USS Gurnard (United States Navy). Three gunners and 49 crew killed.
U-645	Kriegsmarine	World War II: The Type VIIC submarine was depth charged and sunk in the Atlantic Ocean north east of the Azores, Portugal (45°20′N 21°40′W) by USS Schenck (United States Navy) with the loss of all 55 crew.
Unknown landing boat	Kriegsmarine	World War II: The landing boat was sunk by PC-64 Neutralni ( Yugoslav Partisans) at Korčula Island.
Unknown landing boat	Kriegsmarine	World War II: The landing boat was sunk, possibly by Partizan artillery, at Korčula Island.

== 25 December ==
List of shipwrecks: 25 December 1943
Ship	State	Description
DB-1	Soviet Navy	The No. 1-class landing boat was lost on this date.
Daikami Maru	Japan	The vessel sank from an unknown cause near Tsukumi. Two survivors were rescued by Gokoku Maru (Imperial Japanese Navy).
Frederick Bartholdi	United States	World War II: Convoy HX 270: The Liberty ship ran aground off Skye (57°44′N 6°26′W). All on board survived. She was later refloated but was consequently scrapped.
HMT Kingston Beryl	Royal Navy	World War II: The naval trawler (356 GRT, 1928) struck a mine and sank in the Irish Sea north of Ireland with the loss of all 28 crew.
Osorno	Germany	The blockade runner struck the sunken wreck of Sperrbrecher 21 (Kriegsmarine) and was beached on the coast of France to save her cargo.
Tenryu Maru	Imperial Japanese Navy	World War II: The Tenryu Maru-class auxiliary transport (4,861 GRT 1936) was bombed and sunk at Kavieng, New Ireland (02°36′S 150°49′E) by United States Navy aircraft carrier-based planes. Five crew were killed.

== 26 December ==
List of shipwrecks: 26 December 1943
Ship	State	Description
Asian	Hong Kong	The cargo ship was sunk in a collision with Harmatris (United Kingdom) in the Indian Ocean, south of Nagercoil, India (7°45′N 77°40′E). 40 crewmen were lost. There were 14 survivors.
USS Brownson	United States Navy	World War II: The Fletcher-class destroyer was bombed and sunk in the Pacific Ocean off Cape Gloucester, New Britain (5°20′S 148°25′E) by Japanese aircraft with the loss of 108 of her 336 crew. Survivors were rescued by USS Daly and USS Lamson (both United States Navy).
G 101 Nazario Sauro	Kriegsmarine	The guard ship was lost on this date.
Kyoku Maru	Imperial Japanese Navy	World War II: The Kyoku Maru-class tanker was torpedoed and sunk in the Tioro Strait 14 miles (23 km) north west of Kabaena Island (05°07′S 121°38′E) by USS Ray (United States Navy). Twenty-nine passengers and twelve crew were killed.
Scharnhorst	Kriegsmarine	World War II: Battle of North Cape: The Scharnhorst-class battleship was shelled and sunk in the Arctic Sea off North Cape, Norway by HMS Duke of York (Royal Navy) with the loss of 1,942 of her 1,968 crew.

== 27 December ==
List of shipwrecks: 27 December 1943
Ship	State	Description
Alsterufer	Kriegsmarine	World War II: The supply ship was bombed and set afire in the Atlantic Ocean off the west coast of France (46°40′N 19°30′W) by Consolidated B-24 Liberator aircraft of 311 (Czechoslovak) Squadron, Royal Air Force. She was scuttled by her crew. On 31 December, 74 survivors were rescued by Royal Canadian Navy corvettes.
Elna	United States Army	The 1,434-gross register ton, 240-foot (73.2 m) transport ship was wrecked in the Shelikof Strait on the south coast of the Territory of Alaska's Alaska Peninsula near Wide Bay (57°22′N 156°11′W).
José Navarro	United States	World War II: The Liberty ship was torpedoed and sunk in the Laccadive Sea 175 nautical miles (324 km) south west of Cochin, India (8°20′N 73°55′E) by U-178 (Kriegsmarine). All 166 people on board were rescued by HMIS Rajputana (Royal Indian Navy).
Kyūei Maru	Imperial Japanese Navy	World War II: The Standard 1TL tanker was torpedoed and sunk in the Pacific Ocean 162 nautical miles (300 km) west south west of Takao (21°25′N 118°05′E) by USS Flying Fish (United States Navy). There were 54 crew killed. Survivors were rescued by the escort ship Musawa (Imperial Japanese Navy).
NB-5 Ivan	Yugoslav Partisans	World War II: The patrol boat, a former SC-1-class submarine chaser, was sunk by German aircraft.
PC-61 Vadar	Yugoslav Partisans	World War II: The patrol boat was sunk by German aircraft. Raised and brought to Vis Island in July 1944, but eventually scrapped.
PC-67 Kerc	Yugoslav Partisans	World War II: The patrol boat was sunk by German aircraft.

== 28 December ==
List of shipwrecks: 28 December 1943
Ship	State	Description
Axum	Regia Marina	World War II: The Adua-class submarine ran aground off Kaifas, Greece. She was scuttled the next day. The whole crew joined the Greek partisans.
Heizan Maru	Japan	World War II: The transport ship was bombed and sunk in the Yangtze by North American B-25 Mitchell aircraft of the United States Fourteenth Air Force.
Koka Maru	Japan	World War II: The transport ship was bombed and sunk in the Yangtze by North American B-25 Mitchell aircraft of the United States Fourteenth Air Force.
Oldenburg	Germany	World War II: The cargo ship was torpedoed and sunk off Ålesund, Norway (62°13′N 5°08′E) by HMS Seadog (Royal Navy). Six crew and one gunner were killed. There were 76 survivors.
R-64	Kriegsmarine	World War II: The Type R-41 minesweeper was sunk south of Honningsvåg, Norway by a mine. 12 crew were killed.
Robert F. Hoke	United States	World War II: The Liberty ship was torpedoed in the Gulf of Oman by I-26 (Imperial Japanese Navy) and abandoned. All hands (41 merchant sailors and the 27-men Armed Guard) were rescued by a Royal Air Force crash boat. She was later towed to Suez but never returned to active service and was written off as a total loss.
T25	Kriegsmarine	World War II: Battle of the Bay of Biscay: The Type 39 torpedo boat was sunk in action with HMS Glasgow and HMS Enterprise (both Royal Navy) in the Bay of Biscay. 85 crew were killed. The 100 survivors were rescued by U-505 (Kriegsmarine) and Kerlogue (Ireland).
T26	Kriegsmarine	World War II: Battle of the Bay of Biscay: The Type 39 torpedo boat was sunk in action with HMS Glasgow and HMS Enterprise (both Royal Navy) in the Bay of Biscay. 90 crew were killed. The 90 survivors were rescued by Kerlogue (Ireland).
Unyo Maru	Japan	World War II: The transport ship was bombed and sunk in the Yangtze by North American B-25 Mitchell aircraft of the United States Fourteenth Air Force.
PC-60-II Vjekoslava	Yugoslav Partisans	World War II: The patrol boat was sunk by German aircraft.
Z27	Kriegsmarine	World War II: Battle of the Bay of Biscay: The Type 1936A-class destroyer was sunk in action with HMS Glasgow and HMS Enterprise (both Royal Navy) in the Bay of Biscay. A total of 93 men were rescued by U-618 (Kriegsmarine), Spanish destroyers, and Kerlogue (Ireland), but about 300 crewmen were killed.

== 29 December ==
List of shipwrecks: 29 December 1943
Ship	State	Description
Daitei Maru	Japan	World War II: The transport ship was bombed and sunk in the Yangtze by North American B-25 Mitchell aircraft of the United States Fourteenth Air Force.
Kukuzan Maru	Japan	World War II: The transport ship was bombed and sunk in the Yangtze by North American B-25 Mitchell aircraft of the United States Fourteenth Air Force.
Ryuto Maru	Japan	World War II: The cargo ship was torpedoed and sunk in the Pacific Ocean off Palau by USS Silversides (United States Navy).
Shichisei Maru	Japan	World War II: The cargo ship was torpedoed and sunk in the Pacific Ocean off Palau by USS Silversides (United States Navy) with the loss of 35 lives.
Tenposan Maru	Japan	World War II: The cargo ship was torpedoed and sunk in the Pacific Ocean off Palau by USS Silversides (United States Navy).

== 30 December ==
List of shipwrecks: 30 December 1943
Ship	State	Description
Empire Housman	United Kingdom	World War II: Convoy ON 217: The cargo ship (7,359 GRT, 1943) was torpedoed and damaged in the Atlantic Ocean (60°30′N 24°35′W) by U-545 (Kriegsmarine). She then straggled behind the convoy and was again torpedoed and damaged on 3 January 1944 at 60°50′N 22°07′W by U-744 (Kriegsmarine) with the loss of one of her 46 crew. Survivors were rescued by HMS Elm and HMS Earner (both Royal Navy). Empire Housman was taken in tow but sank on 5 January.
Ichiyu Maru	Japan	World War II: The Imperial Japanese Army-chartered Standard Wartime Type 1TM oiler was torpedoed and sunk in the Java Sea near the Karimata Strait (02°45′S 109°10′E) by USS Bluefish (United States Navy). Lost with all hands.
Pinerola	Italy	World War II: The cargo ship was scuttled off Naples. She was refloated in 1946 and subsequently scrapped.

== 31 December ==
List of shipwrecks: 31 December 1943
Ship	State	Description
HMS Clacton	Royal Navy	World War II: The Bangor-class minesweeper (656/820 t, 1942) struck a mine and sank in the Mediterranean Sea east of Corsica, France with the loss of 32 of her 60 crew. Survivors were rescued by HMS Polruan (Royal Navy).
Empire Livingstone	United Kingdom	The cargo ship (6,997 GRT, 1941) ran aground at Bizerta, Tunisia. She was consequently declared a total loss and was scrapped in situ. There were no casualties.
Gennisis Theotokou	Greece	The sailing vessel ran aground in Naousa Bay, Paros Island, Greece and became a total loss. There were no casualties.
HMS ML 1121	Royal Navy	The Harbour Defence Motor Launch (44/52 t, 1942) foundered in the Mediterranean Sea off Pantelleria Italy. There were no casualties.
Pasman	Kriegsmarine	World War II: The minelayer ran aground and was captured.
Shoho Maru	Imperial Japanese Navy	World War II: Convoy No.5282: The Shoei Maru-class cargo ship (1,936 GRT 1937) was torpedoed and sunk in the Pacific Ocean off the Caroline Islands (05°18′N 160°20′E) by USS Greenling (United States Navy). 20 crew were killed. 106 survivors rescued by Kitakami Maru (Imperial Japanese Navy).

== Unknown date ==
List of shipwrecks: Unknown date 1943
Ship	State	Description
D-4 Revolutsyoner	Soviet Navy	World War II: The Dekabrist-class submarine was sunk in a minefield in the Black Sea off the west coast of Crimea after 2 December with a loss of all crew members.
HMS LCA 723	Royal Navy	The landing craft assault (9/12 t, 1943) was lost sometime in December.
Louis C. Tiffany	United States	The Liberty ship was destroyed by fire while under construction and consequently scrapped.
No. 24	Soviet Navy	The G-5-class motor torpedo boat was lost sometime in December.
Oscar Chappell	United States	Convoy HX 271: The cargo ship collided with Charles C. Jones (United States) and was beached.
Protée	Free French Naval Forces	World War II: The Redoutable-class submarine was sunk by a mine in the Mediterranean Sea (43°04′16″N 5°32′14″E) off La Ciotat with the loss of all 74 crew after 18 December 1943.
S-55	Soviet Navy	The S-class submarine was lost with all 52 crew members.
S 631	Kriegsmarine	World War II: The S 631-class motor torpedo boat was sunk by Royal Navy boats.
U-972	Kriegsmarine	The Type VIIC submarine was lost on patrol on or after 15 December.
