= No. 36 Squadron RAF =

Defunct flying squadron of the Royal Air Force

- Active: 18 March 1916 (RFC), 1 April 1918 (RAF) to 13 June 1919; 1 October 1928 – 8 March 1942; 22 October 1942 – 4 June 1945; 1 October 1946 – 15 October 1947; 1 July 1953 – 28 February 1957; 1 September 1958 – 3 November 1975
- Country: United Kingdom
- Branch: Royal Air Force
- Mottos: Malay: Rajawali raja langit ("Eagle King of the Sky")

No. 36 Squadron of the Royal Flying Corps (later the Royal Air Force) was formed in 1916 at Cramlington Aerodrome, just north of Newcastle-upon-Tyne, in order to defend a section of the North East coast from German Zeppelin attacks at night. Disbanded shortly after the end of WWI, it was reformed as a torpedo bomber unit and served in Singapore and Burma (now Myanmar) in the 1930s, seeing action in 1941–42 when Japan entered the war. After re-equipping with Vickers Wellingtons, it served the remainder of the war as an anti-submarine unit, in the Indian Ocean, the Mediterranean, and later in UK home waters. After WWII the squadron operated intermittently in various roles, including maritime reconnaissance, and later as a transport unit flying C-130 Hercules until it was disbanded for the last time in 1975.

== History ==
=== First World War ===
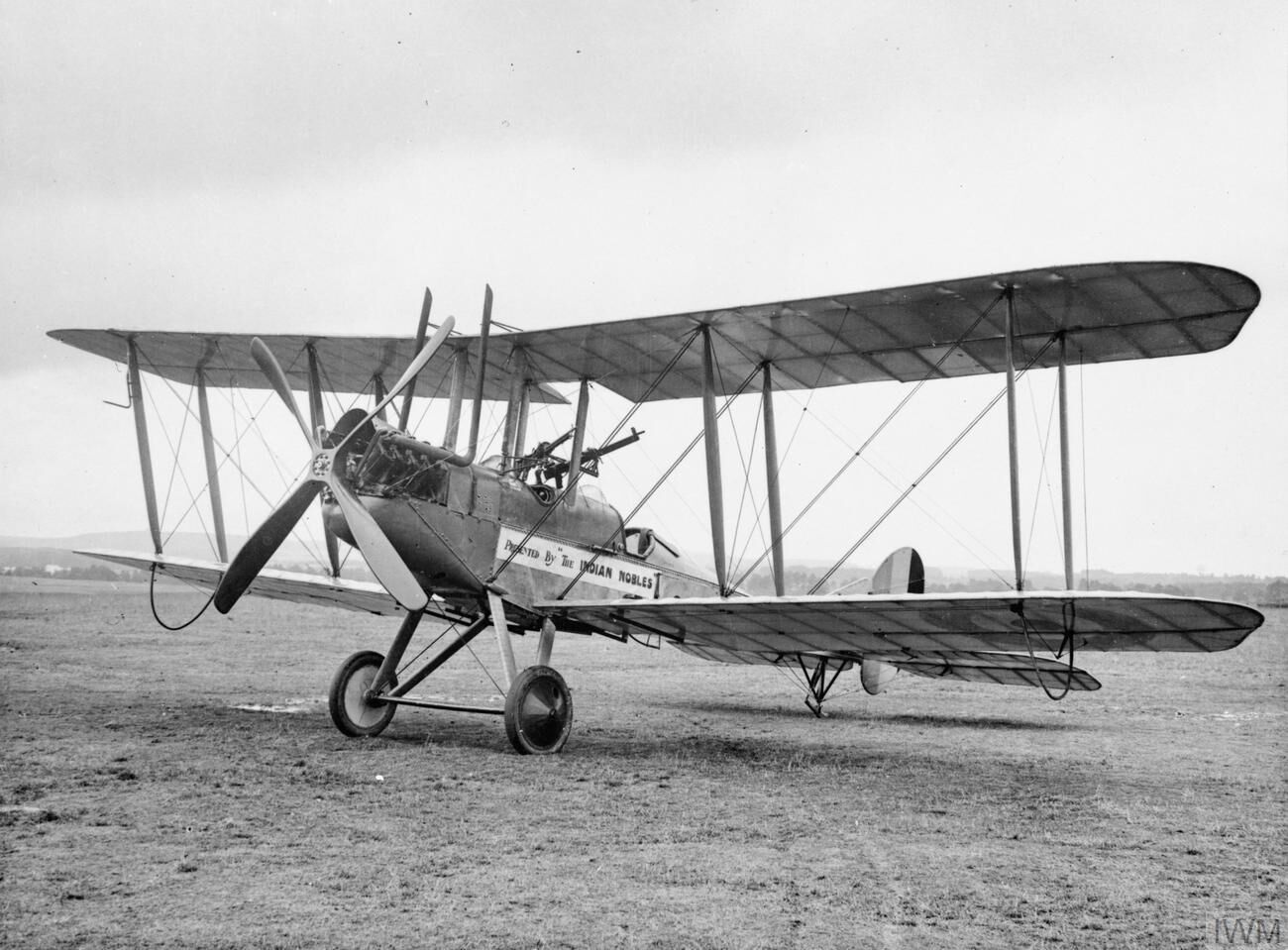
Royal Aircraft Factory B.E.2c

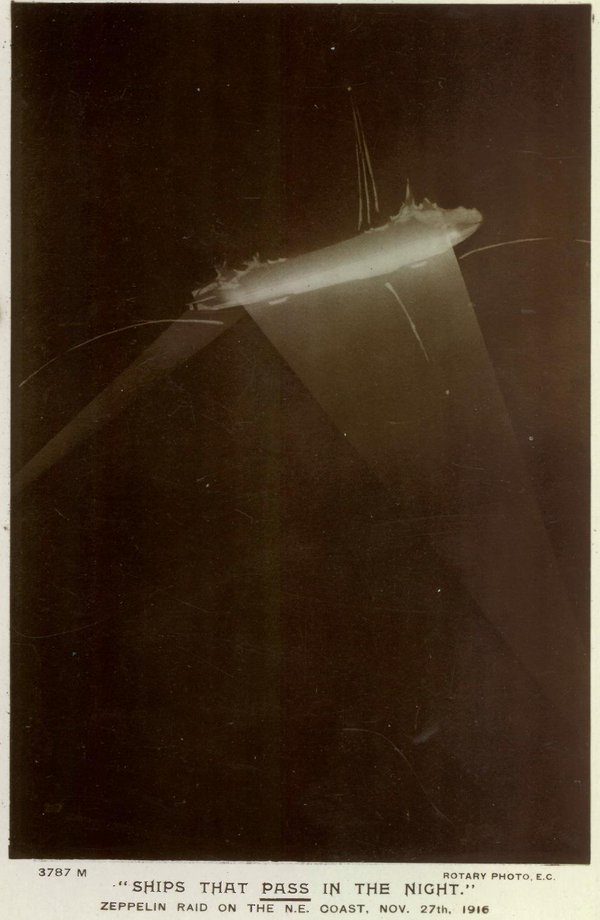
Zeppelin L 34 in flames over Hartlepool, 27 November 1916

No. 36 Squadron Royal Flying Corps was first formed on 18 March 1916 at Cramlington Aerodrome, Northumberland as a Home Defence squadron, defending the coastline between Newcastle upon Tyne and Whitby against German Zeppelin attacks. On 27 November 1916, Second Lieutenant Ian Vernon Pyott, flying a Royal Aircraft Factory B.E.2c, destroyed Zeppelin L.34 over Hartlepool, for which he was awarded the Distinguished Service Order. Once Zeppelin attacks on the North of England stopped, the Squadron switched to training duties, becoming part of the Royal Air Force on 1 April 1918, disbanding on 13 June 1919.

=== Torpedo bombers ===
On 1 October 1928, No. 36 Squadron was reformed by redesignating the Coast Defence Torpedo Flight, based at Donibristle in Scotland and flying Hawker Horsleys. It was sent to Singapore to strengthen its defences against naval attack, with its aircraft reaching its destination on 17 December 1930. As well as practicing torpedo attacks and working with the Royal Navy, 36 Squadron was deployed to Rangoon in response to a rebellion in Burma, carrying out bombing raids against the insurgents. The squadron was re-equipped with Vickers Vildebeests in July 1935, continuing as a torpedo bomber squadron operating from Singapore. The squadron's badge, awarded in February 1938, reflected its role on torpedoes, showing an "eagle wings elevated perched on a torpedo".

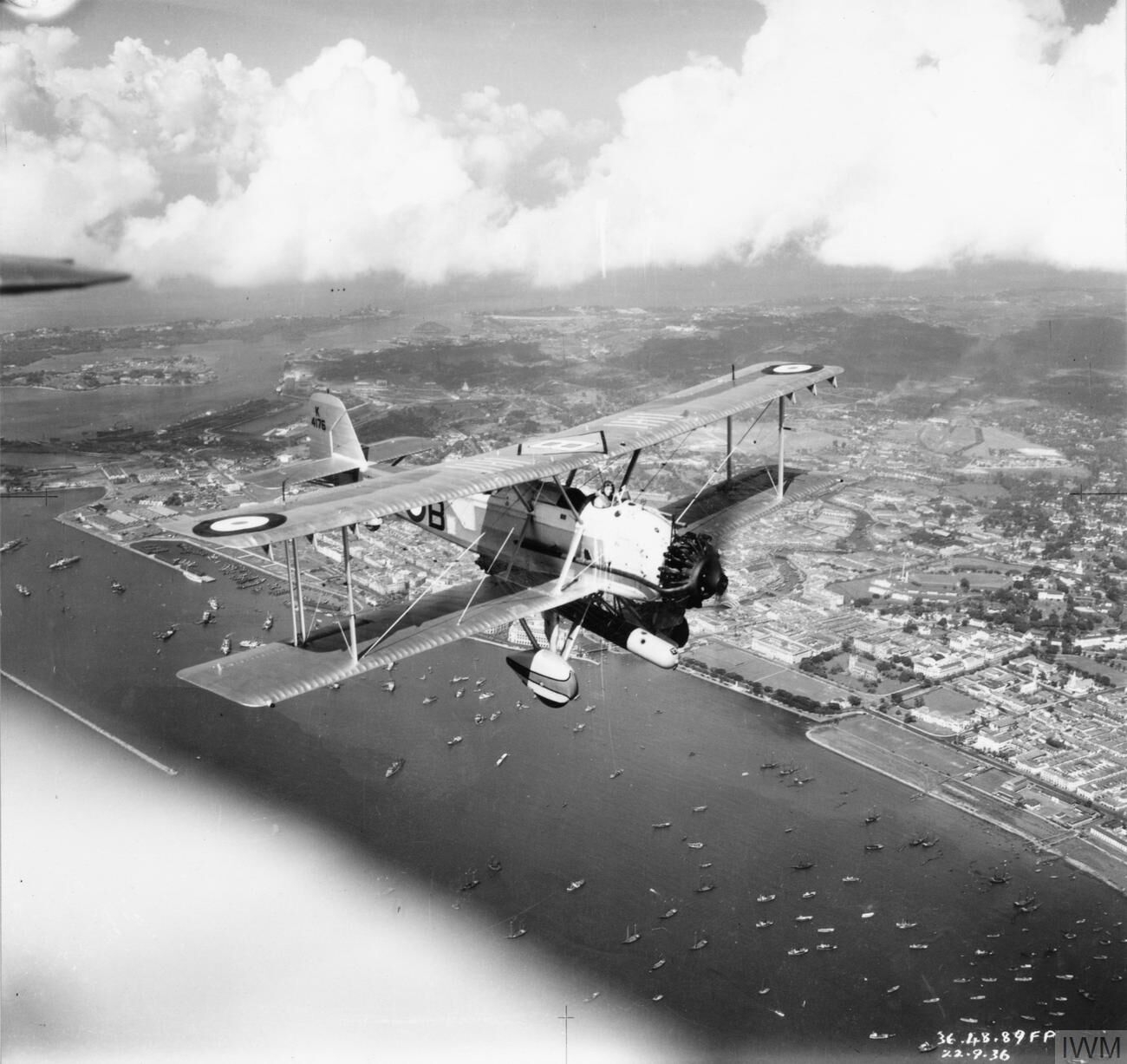
Vickers Vildebeest Mk III of No. 36 Squadron in flight over Singapore. 22 September 1936

=== Second World War ===
No. 36 Squadron, along with No. 100 Squadron RAF retained the obsolete biplanes when Japan invaded Malaya, and flew an unsuccessful attack against the Japanese cruiser Sendai during the Battle of Kota Bharu on 8 December 1941. It continued operating against the Japanese, its Vildebeests being supplemented by five ex-Fleet Air Arm Fairey Albacores. Where possible it operated by night, bombing Japanese-held airfields and troops.

On 26 January 1942, Japanese forces landed at Endau, on the east coast of Malaya, 150 miles from Singapore. To oppose this landing, nine Vildebeests of No. 100 Squadron and three of 36 Squadron, together with nine Australian Lockheed Hudsons, set off at 1:00 pm (having flown against land targets the night before), and despite a fighter escort five Vildebeests were shot down. No. 36 and 100 Squadrons repeated the attack two hours later with nine Vildebeests (with two from 100 Squadron) and three Albacores. This time the fighter escort was late, only finding the bomber force once it had been engaged by Japanese Nakajima Ki-27 fighters, with a further five Vildebeests and two Albacores shot down, and a further two more damaged so badly that they were written off. These losses—which included the commanding officers of both Squadrons—could not be sustained, and the remnants of the two squadrons were evacuated to Java on 31 January, being merged into a single unit. On 28 February, nine Vildebeests attacked a Japanese convoy off Rembang in Northern Java, claiming eight ships sunk but losing another commanding officer. It ceased to exist on 7 March 1942 after its last two Vildebeests ditched off Sumatra while attempting to evacuate to Ceylon.

No. 36 Squadron reformed at Thanjavur in India on 22 October 1942, although it did not receive any aircraft until December that year when it was equipped with Vickers Wellington bombers for anti-submarine patrols off Madras. It flew its first convoy escort mission on 13 January 1943.

It moved to Algeria in June 1943. One tactic used against German U-boats in the Mediterranean was known as "Swamp", the area around a sighting would be saturated with aircraft, keeping the submarine submerged and stopping it from charging its batteries. On 12 December 1943, the destroyer HMS Tynedale was torpedoed and sunk by the German submarine U-593 while escorting the convoy KMS 34 off Algeria. In response, the area was saturated by ships and aircraft. During the hunt, U-593 sank another destroyer, HMS Holcombe, before a Wellington of 36 Squadron detected the submarine on radar on the night of 12/13 December. While its attack was unsuccessful, its sighting report directed the destroyers USS Wainwright and HMS Calpe to the vicinity, where they sank U-593 by depth charging, the first submarine sunk by the "Swamp" tactic. On the night of 7/8 January 1943, a 36 Squadron Wellington sighted U-343 off the coast of southern Spain, but was shot down when it attempted to attack the submarine. A second 36 Squadron Wellington responded to the sighting report and attacked U-343, but was damaged by return fire from the submarine although it did manage to safely return to base. On the next night a third 36 Squadron aircraft found U-343 and directed two Wellingtons from 179 Squadron to attack, one of was shot down by the submarine, which after yet further attacks by a Catalina flying boat of 202 Squadron finally managed to escape and reach its base at Toulon. Another example of the "swamp" tactic took place on 14–17 May 1944, when Leigh Light equipped Wellingtons of 36 Squadron made several attacks on U-616, which culminated in it being sunk by US Navy destroyers, while on 18 May a Wellington of No. 36 Squadron sighted and attacked U-960 before directing the destroyers USS Ludlow and Niblack, which sank the U-boat. It returned to RAF Chivenor in September 1944, continuing in the anti-submarine role. It disbanded at RAF Benbecula on 4 June 1945.

=== Post-war operations ===
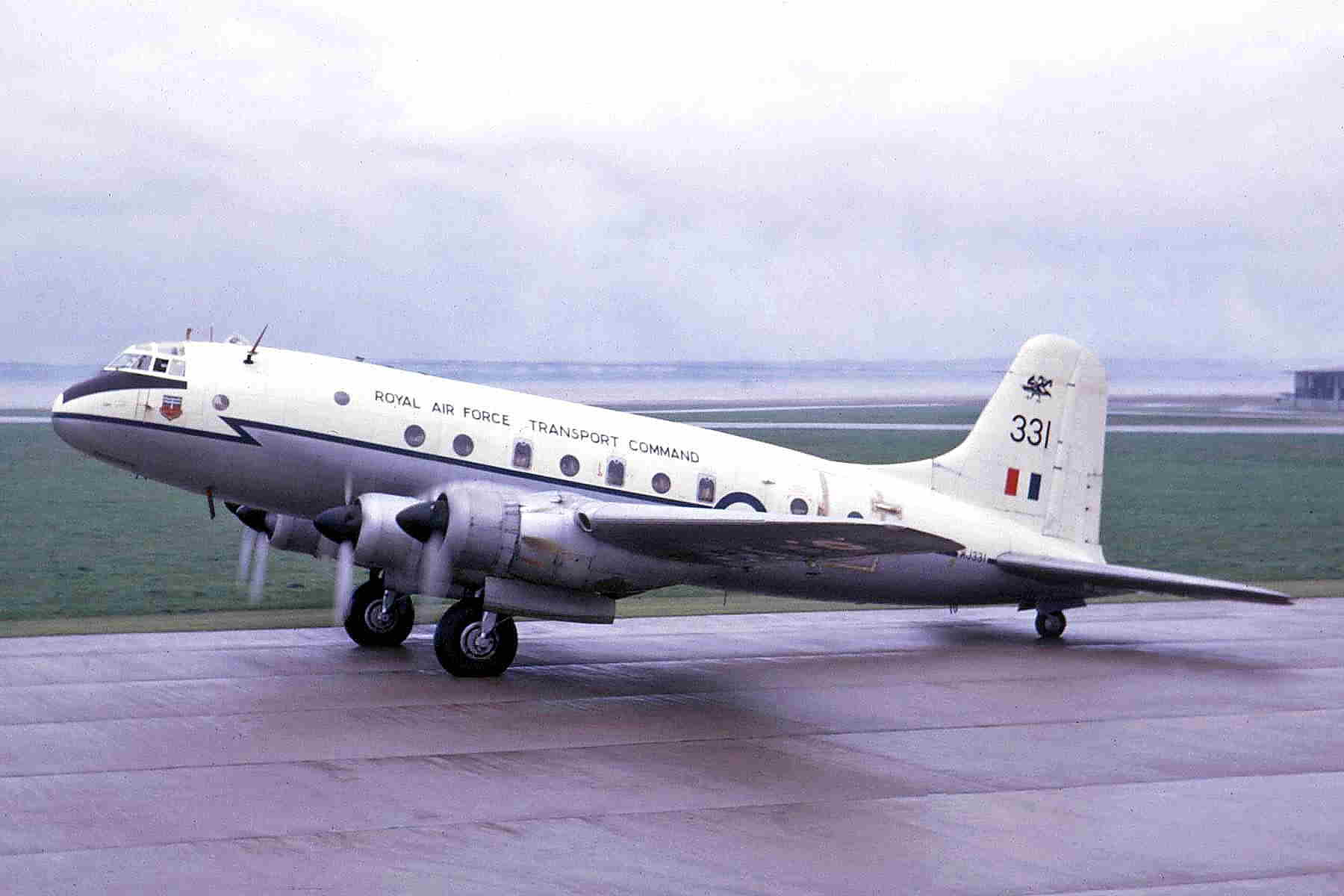
Handley Page Hastings, RAF Transport Command, 1964

The squadron next operated twice for RAF Coastal Command firstly between 1946 and 1947, and then between 1953 and 1957. On 1 October 1946, the squadron was reformed at Thorney Island by renumbering No. 248 Squadron, flying de Havilland Mosquitos, being disbanded again on 15 October 1947. The squadron was again reformed on 1 July 1953 as a maritime reconnaissance unit at RAF Topcliffe, flying Lockheed P-2 Neptunes until 28 February 1957. The following year, on 1 September, the squadron re-emerged at RAF Colerne as a transport squadron, flying the Handley Page Hastings previously operated by No. 511 Squadron RAF, and concentrating on tactical transport operations. In August 1967 the squadron relocated to RAF Lyneham and the Hastings were replaced by Lockheed C-130 Hercules. It was disbanded again on 3 November 1975.

== Aircraft operated ==
Source – The Squadrons of the Royal Air Force unless stated

- Royal Aircraft Factory B.E.2
- Royal Aircraft Factory B.E.12
- Royal Aircraft Factory F.E.2b
- Armstrong Whitworth F.K.8
- Bristol Scout
- Avro 504K
- Sopwith Pup
- Bristol Fighter
- Hawker Horsley I: 1928–1930
- Hawker Horsley III: 1930–1935
- Vickers Vildebeest III: 1935–1942
- Fairey Albacore: 1941–1942
- Vickers Wellington Ic: 1942–1943
- Vickers Wellington VIII: 1943
- Vickers Wellington X: 1943
- Vickers Wellington XI: 1943
- Vickers Wellington XII: 1943
- Vickers Wellington XIII: 1943
- Vickers Wellington XIV: 1943–1945
- de Havilland Mosquito F.B.6: 1946–1947
- Lockheed P-2 Neptune: 1953–1957
- Handley Page Hastings: 1958–1967
- Lockheed C-130 Hercules: 1967–1975

== See also ==
- List of Royal Air Force aircraft squadrons
