= USS Skill (AM-115) =

Auk-class minesweeper

Coordinates: 40°20′N 14°35′E

History

United States
- Name: USS Skill
- Builder: American Ship Building Company, Cleveland, Ohio
- Laid down: 28 November 1941
- Launched: 22 June 1942
- Commissioned: 17 November 1942
- Stricken: 11 October 1943
- Honors and awards: 1 battle stars (World War II)
- Fate: Sunk by torpedo off the Italian coast, 25 September 1943.

General characteristics
- Class & type: Auk-class minesweeper
- Displacement: 890 long tons (904 t)
- Length: 221 ft 3 in (67.44 m)
- Beam: 32 ft (9.8 m)
- Draft: 10 ft 9 in (3.28 m)
- Speed: 18 knots (33 km/h; 21 mph)
- Complement: 105 officers and enlisted
- Armament: 1 × 3"/50 caliber gun; 2 × 40 mm guns

USS Skill (AM-115) was an Auk-class minesweeper acquired by the United States Navy for the dangerous task of removing mines from minefields laid in the water to prevent ships from passing.

Skill was the first of two ships to bear that name. She was laid down on 28 November 1941 by American Ship Building Company of Cleveland, Ohio; launched on 22 June 1942; and placed in service on 17 November 1942.

== North African operations ==
After a brief shakedown cruise, Skill was ordered to the Mediterranean Sea where she swept mines and performed other mine-warfare countermeasures along the North African coast before the invasion there. After the initial invasion at Salerno, Italy, she was assigned patrol and convoy duty in that area. She returned to the area from escort duty on 25 September 1943 and was assigned a patrol station.

== Sunk by torpedo ==
At 1140, not long after she had taken station, her forward magazine exploded. This was probably due to a submarine's torpedo because a survivor, whose station was on the bridge, later reported having seen a wake of undetermined origin paralleling the ship at a distance of about 150 yards.

Skill was blown in half and the forward section capsized. The after half caught fire, and the flames moved aft until that section exploded and sank at about 1200. Ten minutes later, the capsized bow slipped beneath the waves. Of her 103 officers and men, none of the officers and only 31 of the men survived. Her name was struck from the Navy list on 11 October 1943.

== Notes ==
Skill was mistaken for an Allied destroyer and was sunk by U-593, commanded by Kptlt. Gerd Kelbling. U-593 had been laid down in 1940 in Hamburg, Germany and was successful in sinking Allied ships. Eventually, in the Mediterranean Sea, Allied warships caught up with it and it was sunk by USS Wainwright (DD-419) and HMS Calpe. Unlike the Skill, with its great loss of life, all crew members of U-593 survived its sinking, and were taken captive by Allied forces.

== Awards ==
Skill was awarded one battle star for World War II service.
