= Frederick Habberfield =

British cyclist

Personal information
- Born: 5 February 1895 Kentish Town, London, England
- Died: 12 December 1943 (aged 48) HMS Holcombe, Mediterranean Sea

Cycling career
- Sport: Cycling

Amateur team
- Polytechnic C.C., Westminster

Frederick Henry Habberfield (5 February 1895 – 12 December 1943) was a British cyclist. He competed in two events at the 1924 Summer Olympics. He was killed in action during World War II.

== Personal life ==
Habberfield served as a Canteen Manager in the Royal Navy Canteen Service during the Second World War. Posted on the destroyer HMS Holcombe, he was killed in action when the ship was torpedoed by U-593 on 12 December 1943. He is commemorated at Chatham Naval Memorial.
