= USS Niblack =

Gleaves-class destroyer

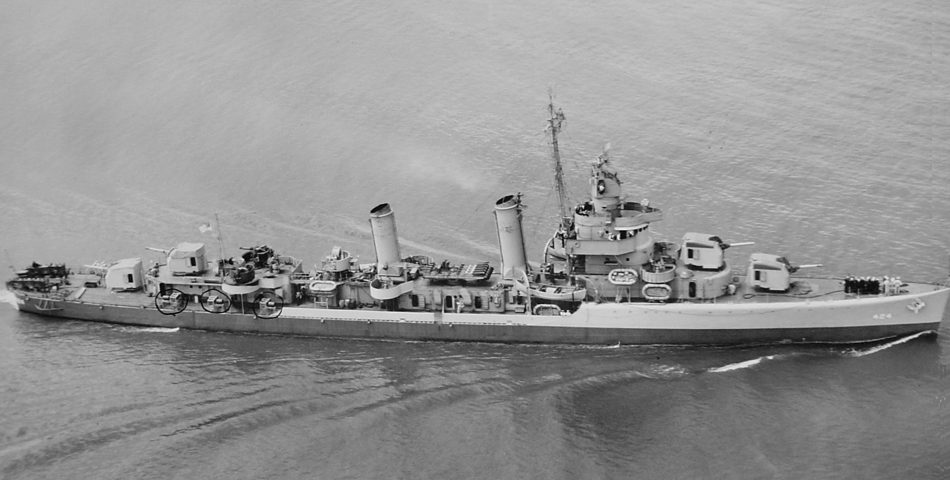
- USS Niblack

History

United States
- Name: Niblack
- Namesake: Albert Parker Niblack
- Builder: Bath Iron Works
- Laid down: 8 August 1938
- Launched: 18 May 1940
- Commissioned: 1 August 1940
- Decommissioned: June 1946
- Stricken: 31 July 1968
- Identification: Callsign: NAVC
- Fate: Sold 16 August 1973; and broken up for scrap

General characteristics
- Class & type: Gleaves-class destroyer
- Displacement: 1,839 tons standard, 2395 tons full load
- Length: 348 ft 3 in (106.15 m)
- Beam: 36 ft 1 in (11.00 m)
- Draft: 13 ft 2 in (4.01 m)
- Propulsion: 50,000 shp (37,000 kW); 4 boilers; 2 propellers
- Speed: 35 knots (65 km/h)
- Range: 6,500 nmi (12,000 km; 7,500 mi) at 12 kn (22 km/h; 14 mph)
- Complement: 16 officers, 260 enlisted
- Armament: 4 × 5 in (127 mm) DP guns, 6 × .50 cal (12.7 mm) guns, 5 × 21 in (533 mm) torpedo tubes, 6 × K-gun depth charge throwers (3 circled in photo), 2 × depth charge tracks

USS Niblack (DD-424), a Gleaves-class destroyer, is the only ship of the United States Navy to be named for Albert Parker Niblack. Niblack became the Director of Naval Intelligence 1 March 1919, and Naval Attaché in London 6 August 1920. As vice admiral, he commanded U.S. Naval Forces in European waters from 15 January 1921 to 17 June 1922.

Niblack was laid down 8 August 1938 by the Bath Iron Works Corp. Bath, Maine; launched 18 May 1940; sponsored by Mrs. Albert P. Niblack, widow of Vice Admiral Niblack; and commissioned 1 August 1940. On 10 April 1941 Niblack dropped depth charges aimed at a German U-boat, U-52, in the first hostile action between American and German forces during World War II.

== Service history ==
=== Service in the Atlantic, 1940–43 ===
After shakedown and training in the Caribbean, Niblack made her first convoy trip to NS Argentia, Newfoundland. In July 1940 she escorted the task force which landed the American occupation troops in Iceland. However, before the actual landings, Niblack made preliminary reconnaissance. On 10 April 1941, as she was nearing the coast, the ship picked up three boatloads of survivors from a torpedoed merchantman. When a submarine was detected, the division commander, Denis L. Ryan, ordered a depth charge attack which drove off the U-52. This bloodless battle was the first action between American and German forces in World War II. On 1 July 1941, Niblack sailed from Argentia with the occupation force, arriving on 7 July.

The destroyer continued escort duty and, with four other destroyers, was escorting a fast convoy across the Atlantic when, on 31 October 1941, a German U-boat's torpedo struck Reuben James blowing her in half — the first United States naval vessel to be lost in World War II. Only 44 survivors were picked up.

After Japan's attack on Pearl Harbor pushed America officially into the war 7 December 1941, Niblack continued to escort North Atlantic convoys to Reykjavík, Iceland, Derry, Northern Ireland, and Greenock, Scotland. In July 1942 she was transferred to the Caribbean for temporary duty at the height of the U-boat campaign there, resuming northern duty in August. In November 1942, she escorted the first support convoy to Casablanca after the Allied landings on the Moroccan Coast. The ship then performed coastal convoy escort duty until departing early in May 1943 for Mers-el-Kébir, Algeria.

=== Service in the Mediterranean, 1943–44 ===
During the invasion of Sicily she performed escort duties and screened the minelaying operation near Gela. She escorted troop ships into Syracuse harbor the day after British troops captured the city. During this operation German torpedo boats attacked Niblack and PC-556 under cover of a dense smoke screen. The American ships drove off the E-boats by gunfire after the enemy craft had fired three torpedoes which missed and exploded near the harbor breakwater.

The destroyer supported the advance of the Allied ground forces across Sicily and entered Palermo Harbor following its capture. Shortly after the rout of the Germans across the Strait of Messina, Niblack, with Boise, Philadelphia, Gleaves, Plunkett, and Benson sortied from Palermo on the night of 17/18 August 1943, and proceeded at high speed to the Italian coast for the first bombardment of the Italian mainland by U.S. Naval Forces.

The ship took part in the landings at Salerno on 9 September 1943. She served at first in the screen, but when the situation ashore became desperate, she joined the fire-support destroyers. On 16–17 September she conducted eleven call-fire support missions. American forces advancing after the bombardment sent back reports of the complete destruction of enemy men and material in Niblack’s target areas.

Later in the Salerno campaign the ship screened cruiser Philadelphia during the radio-controlled bomb attacks which damaged Philadelphia and Savannah. On 27 October Niblack and Brooklyn bombarded enemy coastal guns far behind the front lines in the Gulf of Gaeta, Italy, to pave the way for Allied ground forces.

On 11 December 1943, Niblack joined HMS Holcombe in a search for a German U-boat whose torpedoes had sunk several freighters off Bizerte the day before. U-593 struck first however, and blew up Holcombe with an acoustic torpedo. Niblack rescued 90 survivors and transferred them to an Army hospital ship that night. During the transfer, she spotted antiaircraft fire from the submarine against a British patrol plane and directed Wainwright and HMS Calpe to the scene, where they sank U-593.

Four days later, when a Liberty ship was torpedoed near the harbor entrance at Oran, Niblack and Mayo searched for the submarine. They had narrowed down the search to a small area when they were relieved by the Woolsey, Edison, and Trippe, who subsequently sank U-73.

After a month in Task Force 86, the ship was ordered to support the landings at Anzio. During this invasion the ship commanded the beachhead screen, and fought off simultaneous attacks by dive and torpedo bombers, E-boats, and human torpedoes. From 22 to 29 January 1944, the ship repulsed repeated attacks by enemy aircraft and received credit for destroying one plane and probably splashing two others. During one attack, two ships of her division, DesDiv 13 were put out of action, Plunkett by a 550-pound (250 kg) bomb and Mayo by a mine.

In February, Niblack returned to New York for a brief overhaul, but was back on duty in the Mediterranean in May. The enemy driven from Sicily, North Africa, and Southern Italy intensified his submarine and air attacks on Allied shipping along the African Coast.

One of the U-boats made the mistake of firing at a hunter-killer group which had just finished off another enemy U-boat. These American ships had begun the work of rooting the sub out, but were soon relieved by Woolsey, Madison, Benson, Ludlow, and Niblack. Niblack and Ludlow worked together in the hunt, which began 18 May 1944.

British planes picked up the sub by radar at 02:40 the next morning and Niblack and Ludlow raced to investigate. Establishing sonar contact, the two destroyers dropped eleven depth charges, forcing the sub to the surface. As she started down again both ships opened fire, while the planes dropped bombs close aboard. When the target had gone under again, Niblack rushed in to hit her again with ten more ash cans. Coming up once more, U-960 turned nose down and made her final dive, leaving 20 survivors who were promptly captured.

The summer months of 1944 were spent in fighter-director training. Gleaves and Niblack qualified as the only two fighter director destroyers in the 8th Fleet, and directed French and British planes in repelling the intense German torpedo plane attacks against Allied convoys during the invasion of Southern France.

The initial landings on 15 August 1944 met little resistance, and for several days the ship controlled the routing and dispatching of all outbound convoys, taking her place in the outer screen at night. On 20 August she joined the inshore screen for Quincy, Nevada and Omaha during the siege of Toulon. She was frequently taken under fire by the large coast defense batteries of St. Mandrier and St. Elme and escaped damage from several near misses.

Following the capture of Marseille and Toulon, she was assigned to Task Force 86 and later to "Flank Force," the Allied Naval forces which provided fire support for the 1st Airborne Task Force on the Franco–Italian frontier. During the periods 4 to 17 October and 11 to 25 December 1944, the ship completed numerous fire support missions, operating under the constant threat of explosive boats, human torpedoes, and floating mines. The ship also sank 43 mines, destroyed one German MAS boat, and damaged four others in the harbor of San Remo, Italy.

=== Service in the Pacific, 1945 ===
Niblack next returned to Oran to serve as flagship for Commander, Destroyer Squadron 7, (Commander Destroyer 8th Fleet), returning to the Boston Navy Yard in February 1945. After serving in various antisubmarine groups and as an escort for one convoy from England in April. She transited the Panama Canal on 3 July 1945 and proceeded to Pearl Harbor via San Diego. Following a training program, during which hostilities with Japan ended, the ship escorted the occupation group which landed at Sasebo, Japan, 22 September 1945. She then escorted landing forces to Matsuyama, remaining in the Western Pacific for further duties during the occupation period.

By a directive of June 1946, the ship was decommissioned; and entered the Atlantic Reserve Fleet at Charleston, South Carolina. She was subsequently transferred to Philadelphia where she remained until struck 31 July 1968.

Niblack earned five battle stars for service in the European, African–Middle Eastern Areas.

=== Convoys escorted ===
Convoy	Escort Group	Dates	Notes
	Task force 19	1–7 July 1941	occupation of Iceland prior to US declaration of war
ON 20		30 Sept-9 Oct 1941	from Iceland to Newfoundland prior to US declaration of war
HX 156		24 Oct-1 Nov 1941	from Newfoundland to Iceland prior to US declaration of war
ON 34		12-21 Nov 1941	from Iceland to Newfoundland prior to US declaration of war
HX 163		5-15 Dec 1941	from Newfoundland to Iceland; war declared while escorting convoy
ON 47		22-23 Dec 1941	from Iceland to Newfoundland
HX 170		16-24 Jan 1942	from Newfoundland to Iceland
ON 61		1-10 Feb 1942	from Iceland to Newfoundland
HX 177	MOEF group A2	1–8 March 1942	from Newfoundland to Northern Ireland
ON 77	MOEF group A2	18–26 March 1942	from Northern Ireland to Newfoundland
HX 184	MOEF group A2	12–20 April 1942	from Newfoundland to Northern Ireland
ON 91	MOEF group A2	2–11 May 1942	from Northern Ireland to Newfoundland
AT 18		6-17 Aug 1942	troopships from New York City to Firth of Clyde
