= German submarine U-960 =

German World War II submarine

History

Nazi Germany
- Name: U-960
- Ordered: 5 June 1941
- Builder: Blohm & Voss, Hamburg
- Yard number: 160
- Laid down: 20 March 1942
- Launched: 3 December 1942
- Commissioned: 28 January 1943
- Fate: Sunk on 19 May 1944

General characteristics
- Class & type: Type VIIC submarine
- Displacement: 769 tonnes (757 long tons) surfaced; 871 t (857 long tons) submerged
- Length: 67.10 m (220 ft 2 in) o/a; 50.50 m (165 ft 8 in) pressure hull
- Beam: 6.20 m (20 ft 4 in) o/a; 4.70 m (15 ft 5 in) pressure hull
- Draught: 4.74 m (15 ft 7 in)
- Installed power: 2,800–3,200 PS (2,100–2,400 kW; 2,800–3,200 bhp) (diesels); 750 PS (550 kW; 740 shp) (electric)
- Propulsion: 2 shafts; 2 × diesel engines; 2 × electric motors
- Speed: 17.7 knots (32.8 km/h; 20.4 mph) surfaced; 7.6 knots (14.1 km/h; 8.7 mph) submerged
- Range: 8,500 nmi (15,700 km; 9,800 mi) at 10 knots (19 km/h; 12 mph) surfaced; 80 nmi (150 km; 92 mi) at 4 knots (7.4 km/h; 4.6 mph) submerged
- Test depth: 230 m (750 ft); Crush depth: 250–295 m (820–968 ft)
- Armament: 5 × 53.3 cm (21 in) torpedo tubes (four bow, one stern); 14 × torpedoes or 26 TMA mines; 1 × 8.8 cm (3.46 in) deck gun (220 rounds); 1 × twin 2 cm (0.79 in) C/30 anti-aircraft gun

Service record
- Part of: 5th U-boat Flotilla; 28 January – 31 July 1943; 3rd U-boat Flotilla; 1 August 1943 – 19 May 1944
- Identification codes: M 50 098
- Commanders: Oblt.z.S. Günther Heinrich; 28 January 1943 – 19 May 1944
- Operations: 5 patrols: 1st patrol: 18 August – 1 September 1943; 2nd patrol: a. 14 September – 10 October 1943; b. 14 – 16 October 1943; 3rd patrol: a. 4 December 1943 – 3 February 1944; b. 16 – 18 March 1944; 4th patrol: 19 – 27 March 1944; 5th patrol: 27 April – 19 May 1944
- Victories: 2 merchant ships sunk (9,656 GRT); 1 auxiliary warship sunk (611 GRT)

German submarine U-960 was a Type VIIC U-boat built for Nazi Germany's Kriegsmarine for service during World War II. She was laid down on 20 March 1942 by Blohm & Voss, Hamburg as yard number 160, launched on 3 December 1942 and commissioned on 28 January 1943 under Oberleutnant zur See Günther Heinrich.

== Design ==
German Type VIIC submarines were preceded by the shorter Type VIIB submarines. U-960 had a displacement of 769 tonnes (757 long tons) when at the surface and 871 tonnes (857 long tons) while submerged. She had a total length of 67.10 m (220 ft 2 in), a pressure hull length of 50.50 m (165 ft 8 in), a beam of 6.20 m (20 ft 4 in), a height of 9.60 m (31 ft 6 in), and a draught of 4.74 m (15 ft 7 in). The submarine was powered by two Germaniawerft F46 four-stroke, six-cylinder supercharged diesel engines producing a total of 2,800 to 3,200 metric horsepower (2,060 to 2,350 kW; 2,760 to 3,160 shp) for use while surfaced, two Brown, Boveri & Cie GG UB 720/8 double-acting electric motors producing a total of 750 metric horsepower (550 kW; 740 shp) for use while submerged. She had two shafts and two 1.23 m (4 ft) propellers. The boat was capable of operating at depths of up to 230 metres (750 ft).

The submarine had a maximum surface speed of 17.7 knots (32.8 km/h; 20.4 mph) and a maximum submerged speed of 7.6 knots (14.1 km/h; 8.7 mph). When submerged, the boat could operate for 80 nautical miles (150 km; 92 mi) at 4 knots (7.4 km/h; 4.6 mph); when surfaced, she could travel 8,500 nautical miles (15,700 km; 9,800 mi) at 10 knots (19 km/h; 12 mph). U-960 was fitted with five 53.3 cm (21 in) torpedo tubes (four fitted at the bow and one at the stern), fourteen torpedoes, one 8.8 cm (3.46 in) SK C/35 naval gun, 220 rounds, and one twin 2 cm (0.79 in) C/30 anti-aircraft gun. The boat had a complement of between forty-four and sixty.

== Service history ==
The boat's career began with training at 5th U-boat Flotilla on 28 January 1943, followed by active service on 1 August 1943 as part of the 3rd Flotilla for the remainder of her service. In five patrols she sank two merchant ships, for a total of 9,656 gross register tons (GRT), plus one auxiliary warship of 611 GRT.

=== First patrol ===
In August 1943 U-960 carried out a patrol in the Barents Sea over a 15 day period, but had no success.

=== Second patrol ===
In September 1943 she was part of the U-boat group Wiking on patrol in the Kara Sea beyond Novaya Zemlya. At the end of the month she fell in with a Soviet convoy, VA-18 and sank two ships, the steamer Archangelsk and the naval trawler/minesweeper T-896.

=== Third patrol ===
In December 1943 she was transferred to La Pallice, making a 62 day patrol in the North Atlantic en route. She took part in four patrol lines during this period and had one success, sinking the freighter Sumner I. Kimball, which had fallen out of convoy ON 219. She arrived at La Pallice in March 1944.

=== Fourth patrol ===
Later that month U-960 was assigned to weather-reporting, but was recalled after a few days. On returning under escort and in company with U-763 the flotilla was attacked by Tsetse Mosquito aircraft; U-960 suffered 14 casualties.

=== Fifth and final patrol ===
In April U-960 was transferred to the Mediterranean, passing the Straits of Gibraltar on 9 May. On 17 May she spotted the destroyer Ellyson and fired three torpedoes, which missed. This sparked a massive hunt involving a hunter-killer group of five destroyers and aircraft from two RAF squadrons. After a 42 hour hunt U-960 was forced to the surface and sunk.

=== Wolfpacks ===
U-960 took part in five wolfpacks, namely:

- Wiking (20 September – 3 October 1943)
- Coronel 1 (15 – 17 December 1943)
- Amrum (18 – 23 December 1943)
- Rügen 4 (23 – 28 December 1943)
- Rügen 3 (28 – 31 December 1943)

=== Fate ===
U-960 was sunk on 19 May 1944 in the Mediterranean Sea northwest of Algiers, in position 37°20′N 01°35′E following a 42-hour "hunt to exhaustion". Following her attack on Ellyson on 17 May U-960 was pursued by a group of five US destroyers (Benson, Ludlow, Madison, Niblack and Woolsey), assisted by aircraft of 36 and 500 Squadrons, in a "Swamp" operation. U-960 lay low during the daytime but late on 17 May she surfaced to recharge batteries: she was sighted and forced under but early on 18 May was able to surface and re-charge batteries. During the next day U-960 evaded detection but in the early hours of 19 May she was spotted again on the surface by a Wellington of 36 Squadron which called in destroyers Niblack and Ludlow. These carried out a series of depth-charge attacks over a four hour period, assisted also by a Ventura of 500 Squadron: U-960 was forced to the surface and abandoned. 20 of her 51 crew were saved.

== Summary of raiding history ==
Date	Ship Name	Nationality	Tonnage (Note: Merchant ship tonnages are in gross register tons. Military vessels are listed by tons displacement.)	Fate
30 September 1943	Arkhangel’sk	Soviet Union	2,480	Sunk
1 October 1943	T-896 (No 42)	Soviet Navy	611	Sunk
16 January 1944	Sumner I. Kimball	United States	7,176	Sunk

== See also ==
- Mediterranean U-boat Campaign (World War II)

== Bibliography ==
- Alden, John D. (2004). "Question 32/03: Loss of U-616 and U-960". Warship International. XLI (4): 333–335. ISSN 0043-0374.
- Blair, Clay (1998) Hitler's U-Boat War Vol II:The Hunted 1942-1945 Cassell. ISBN 0-304-35261-6
- Busch, Rainer; Röll, Hans-Joachim (1999). German U-boat Commanders of World War II: A Biographical Dictionary. Translated by Brooks, Geoffrey. London, Annapolis, Maryland: Greenhill Books, Naval Institute Press. ISBN 1-55750-186-6.
- Busch, Rainer; Röll, Hans-Joachim (1999). Der U-Boot-Krieg, 1939-1945: Deutsche U-Boot-Verluste von September 1939 bis Mai 1945 [German U-boat losses from September 1939 to May 1945] (in German). Vol. IV. Hamburg, Berlin, Bonn: Mittler. ISBN 3-8132-0514-2.
- Gröner, Erich; Jung, Dieter; Maass, Martin (1991). U-boats and Mine Warfare Vessels. German Warships 1815–1945. Vol. 2. Translated by Thomas, Keith; Magowan, Rachel. London: Conway Maritime Press. ISBN 0-85177-593-4.
- Kemp, Paul ( 1997) U-Boats Destroyed Arms & Armour. ISBN 1 85409 515 3
- Niestle, Axel (1998) German U-Boat Losses during World War II Greenhill Books. ISBN 1 85367 352 8
- Sharpe, Peter (1998). U-Boat Fact File. Great Britain: Midland Publishing. ISBN 1-85780-072-9.
