= German submarine U-545 =

German World War II submarine

History

Nazi Germany
- Name: U-545
- Ordered: 5 June 1941
- Builder: Deutsche Werft, Hamburg
- Yard number: 366
- Laid down: 1 August 1942
- Launched: 3 March 1943
- Commissioned: 19 May 1943
- Fate: Scuttled on 10 February 1944 west of the Hebrides after an attack by Allied aircraft

General characteristics
- Class & type: Type IXC/40 submarine
- Displacement: 1,144 t (1,126 long tons) surfaced; 1,257 t (1,237 long tons) submerged
- Length: 76.76 m (251 ft 10 in) o/a; 58.75 m (192 ft 9 in) pressure hull
- Beam: 6.86 m (22 ft 6 in) o/a; 4.44 m (14 ft 7 in) pressure hull
- Height: 9.60 m (31 ft 6 in)
- Draught: 4.67 m (15 ft 4 in)
- Installed power: 4,400 PS (3,200 kW; 4,300 bhp) (diesels); 1,000 PS (740 kW; 990 shp) (electric)
- Propulsion: 2 shafts; 2 × diesel engines; 2 × electric motors
- Speed: 18.3 knots (33.9 km/h; 21.1 mph) surfaced; 7.3 knots (13.5 km/h; 8.4 mph) submerged
- Range: 13,850 nmi (25,650 km; 15,940 mi) at 10 knots (19 km/h; 12 mph) surfaced; 63 nmi (117 km; 72 mi) at 4 knots (7.4 km/h; 4.6 mph) submerged
- Test depth: 230 m (750 ft)
- Complement: 4 officers, 44 enlisted
- Armament: 6 × torpedo tubes (4 bow, 2 stern); 22 × 53.3 cm (21 in) torpedoes; 1 × 10.5 cm (4.1 in) SK C/32 deck gun (180 rounds); 1 × 3.7 cm (1.5 in) SK C/30 AA gun; 1 × twin 2 cm FlaK 30 AA guns

Service record
- Part of: 4th U-boat Flotilla; 19 May – 30 November 1943; 2nd U-boat Flotilla; 1 December 1943 – 10 February 1944
- Identification codes: M 52 062
- Commanders: Kptlt. Gert Manesmann; 19 May 1943 – 10 February 1944
- Operations: 1 patrol: 9 December 1943 – 10 February 1944
- Victories: 1 merchant ship damaged (7,359 GRT)

German submarine U-545 was a Type IXC U-boat of Nazi Germany's Kriegsmarine during World War II.

She was laid down at the Deutsche Werft (yard) in Hamburg as yard number 366 on 1 August 1942, launched on 3 March 1943 and commissioned on 19 May with Kapitänleutnant Gert Mannesmann in command.

U-545 began her service career with training as part of the 4th U-boat Flotilla from 19 May 1943. She was reassigned to the 2nd flotilla for operations on 1 December.

She carried out one patrol and damaged one ship. She was a member of five wolfpacks.

She was scuttled on 10 February 1944 west of the Hebrides after an attack by Allied aircraft.

== Design ==
German Type IXC/40 submarines were slightly larger than the original Type IXCs. U-545 had a displacement of 1,144 tonnes (1,126 long tons) when at the surface and 1,257 tonnes (1,237 long tons) while submerged. The U-boat had a total length of 76.76 m (251 ft 10 in), a pressure hull length of 58.75 m (192 ft 9 in), a beam of 6.86 m (22 ft 6 in), a height of 9.60 m (31 ft 6 in), and a draught of 4.67 m (15 ft 4 in). The submarine was powered by two MAN M 9 V 40/46 supercharged four-stroke, nine-cylinder diesel engines producing a total of 4,400 metric horsepower (3,240 kW; 4,340 shp) for use while surfaced, two Siemens-Schuckert 2 GU 345/34 double-acting electric motors producing a total of 1,000 shaft horsepower (1,010 PS; 750 kW) for use while submerged. She had two shafts and two 1.92 m (6 ft) propellers. The boat was capable of operating at depths of up to 230 metres (750 ft).

The submarine had a maximum surface speed of 18.3 knots (33.9 km/h; 21.1 mph) and a maximum submerged speed of 7.3 knots (13.5 km/h; 8.4 mph). When submerged, the boat could operate for 63 nautical miles (117 km; 72 mi) at 4 knots (7.4 km/h; 4.6 mph); when surfaced, she could travel 13,850 nautical miles (25,650 km; 15,940 mi) at 10 knots (19 km/h; 12 mph). U-545 was fitted with six 53.3 cm (21 in) torpedo tubes (four fitted at the bow and two at the stern), 22 torpedoes, one 10.5 cm (4.13 in) SK C/32 naval gun, 180 rounds, and a 3.7 cm (1.5 in) SK C/30 as well as a 2 cm (0.79 in) C/30 anti-aircraft gun. The boat had a complement of forty-eight.

== Service history ==
=== Patrol and loss ===
The boat departed Kiel on 9 December 1943, moved through the North Sea, negotiated the 'gap' between Iceland and the Faroe Islands and entered the Atlantic Ocean.

She damaged Empire Housman on 31 December. This ship was later sunk on 3 January 1944 by U-744.

The first Watch Officer (1WO), Oberleutnant zur See Hans Wilkening, was swept overboard on 26 January 1944.

On 10 February 1944 U-545 was scuttled following damage from an attack by a Vickers Wellington of No. 612 Squadron RAF. A Canadian Wellington from 407 Squadron RCAF was also involved, but was shot down.

One man died in the U-boat; there were 56 survivors. They were picked up by U-714 and taken to St. Nazaire in France.

== Summary of raiding history ==
Date	Ship Name	Nationality	Tonnage (GRT)	Fate
30 December 1943	Empire Housman	United Kingdom	7,359	Damaged

== Bibliography ==
- Busch, Rainer; Röll, Hans-Joachim (1999). German U-boat commanders of World War II : a biographical dictionary. Translated by Brooks, Geoffrey. London, Annapolis, Md: Greenhill Books, Naval Institute Press. ISBN 1-55750-186-6.
- Busch, Rainer; Röll, Hans-Joachim (1999). Deutsche U-Boot-Verluste von September 1939 bis Mai 1945 [German U-boat losses from September 1939 to May 1945]. Der U-Boot-Krieg (in German). Vol. IV. Hamburg, Berlin, Bonn: Mittler. ISBN 3-8132-0514-2.
- Gröner, Erich; Jung, Dieter; Maass, Martin (1991). U-boats and Mine Warfare Vessels. German Warships 1815–1945. Vol. 2. Translated by Thomas, Keith; Magowan, Rachel. London: Conway Maritime Press. ISBN 0-85177-593-4.
- Kemp, Paul (1997). U-Boats Destroyed - German Submarine Losses in the World Wars. Arms & Armour. ISBN 1-85409-515-3.
