= HMS Holcombe =

British destroyer

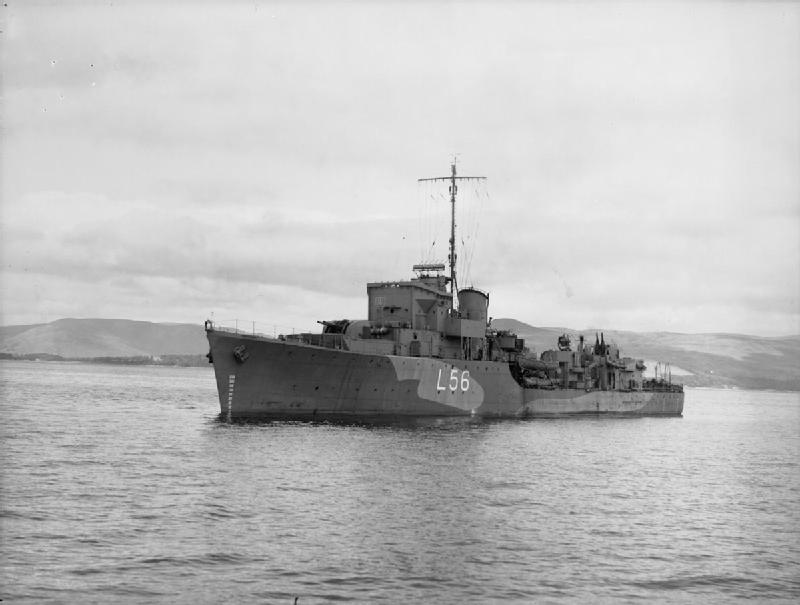
- HMS Holcombe

History

United Kingdom
- Name: HMS Holcombe
- Ordered: 23 August 1940
- Builder: Alexander Stephen and Sons, Glasgow
- Yard number: J1489
- Laid down: 3 April 1941
- Launched: 14 April 1942
- Commissioned: 16 September 1942
- Identification: Pennant number: L56
- Fate: Torpedoed and sunk on 12 December 1943 off the Algerian coast.

General characteristics
- Type: Type III Hunt-class destroyer
- Displacement: 1,050 long tons (1,070 t) standard; 1,435 long tons (1,458 t) full load
- Length: 85.3 m (279 ft 10 in) o/a
- Beam: 10.16 m (33 ft 4 in)
- Draught: 3.51 m (11 ft 6 in)
- Propulsion: 2 Admiralty 3-drum boilers; 2 shaft Parsons geared turbines, 19,000 shp (14,000 kW)
- Speed: 27 knots (50 km/h; 31 mph); 25.5 knots (47.2 km/h; 29.3 mph) full
- Range: 2,350 nmi (4,350 km) at 20 kn (37 km/h)
- Complement: 168
- Armament: 4 × QF 4-inch (102 mm) Mark XVI on twin mounts Mk. XIX; 4 × QF 2-pounder Mk. VIII on quad mount MK.VII; 2 × 20 mm Oerlikons on single mounts P Mk. III; 2 × 21 inch (533 mm) torpedo tubes; 110 depth charges, 4 throwers, 3 racks

HMS Holcombe was a Type III Hunt-class destroyer of the Royal Navy. She was named after the Holcombe Hunt in Lancashire. She was the first and thus far only ship of the Royal Navy named HMS Holcombe.

Built on the Clyde by Alexander Stephen and Sons, she was laid down on 3 April 1941, launched on 14 April 1942 and commissioned on 16 September 1942.

== Service history ==
Holcombe was allocated to the Mediterranean Fleet in October 1942 but only arrived at Gibraltar on 1 February 1943 after first escorting convoy WS24 to Freetown and then being retained there as a convoy escort. Once in the Mediterranean she was used on escort duties initially based at Gibraltar and subsequently at Algiers and then Malta. She was involved in escorting the invasion fleet for Operation Husky.

== Loss ==
Whilst escorting convoy KMS34 on 12 December 1943 her sister ship HMS Tynedale was torpedoed and sunk off Jijel, Algeria, by U-593 commanded by Kptlt. Gerd Kelbling. The other escorts commenced to search for the submarine but U-593 managed to torpedo Holcombe during the hunt. Holcombe sank rapidly with the loss of 84 men. U-593 was sunk after being depth charged by two other escorts of KMS34, USS Wainwright and HMS Calpe, off Bougie, Algeria, in position 37°38′N 05°58′E on the following day. There were no casualties.

== Publications ==
- Colledge, J. J.; Warlow, Ben (2006) [1969]. Ships of the Royal Navy: The Complete Record of All Fighting Ships of the Royal Navy from the 15th Century to the Present (3rd Rev ed.). London: Chatham Publishing. ISBN 978-1-86176-281-8. OCLC 67375475.
- English, John (1987). The Hunts: a history of the design, development and careers of the 86 destroyers of this class built for the Royal and Allied Navies during World War II. England: World Ship Society. ISBN 0-905617-44-4.
