= HMS Tynedale =

Destroyer of the Royal Navy

Coordinates: 37°10′N 6°5′E

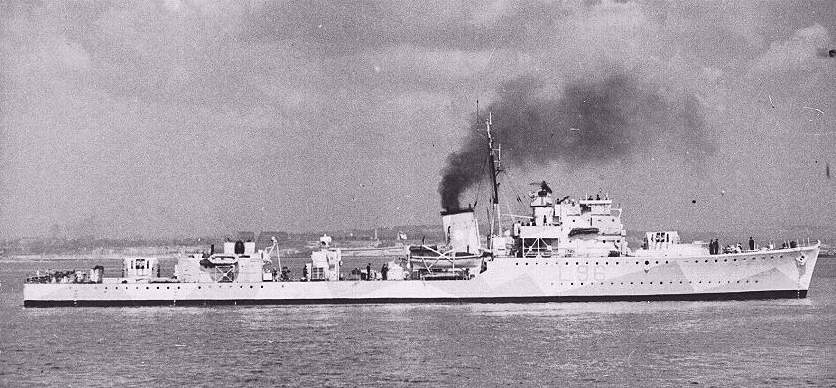
- Tynedale in July 1942

History

United Kingdom
- Name: HMS Tynedale
- Ordered: 11 April 1939
- Builder: Alexander Stephen and Sons
- Laid down: 27 July 1939
- Launched: 5 June 1940
- Commissioned: 5 November 1940
- Honours and awards: St. Nazaire 1942; English Channel 1942–43; Sicily 1943
- Fate: Sunk, 12 December 1943
- Badge: On a Field Red, in front of two arrows in saltire white a hunting horn erect gold.

General characteristics
- Class & type: Hunt-class destroyer
- Displacement: 1,000 long tons (1,016 t) standard; 1,340 long tons (1,362 t) full load
- Length: 280 ft (85 m)
- Beam: 29 ft (8.8 m)
- Draught: 10 ft 9 in (3.28 m)
- Propulsion: Two x Admiralty 3 drum boilers; Two shaft Parsons geared turbines; 19,000 shp
- Speed: 27½ kn (26 knots full)
- Range: 3,500 nmi (6,480 km) at 15 knots (28 km/h) / 1,000 nmi (2,000 km) at 26 knots (48 km/h)
- Complement: 146
- Armament: 4 × QF 4-inch (102 mm) Mark XVI guns on twin mounts Mk. XIX; 4 × QF 2-pounder (40 mm) Mk. VIII AA guns on quad mount MK.VII; 2 × 20 mm Oerlikon AA guns on single mounts P Mk. III; 40 depth charges, 2 throwers, 1 rack

HMS Tynedale was a Hunt-class destroyer of the first subgroup which served during the Second World War. She was sunk by the German submarine U-593 on 12 December 1943.

== Construction ==
Tynedale was ordered from Alexander Stephen and Sons on 11 April 1939 as part of the 1939 Programme and laid down on 27 July 1939 under yard number J1471. She was launched on 5 June 1940 and commissioned on 2 December 1940. She was adopted by the civil community of Hexham, Northumberland following a Warship Week savings campaign in February 1942.

== Service and loss ==
Tynedale was mostly employed on convoy and escort duties initially as part of the First Destroyer Flotilla based at Portsmouth. On 11 March 1941 she sustained damage which put her out of action for 9 days from an air raid of Portsmouth's docks by the Luftwaffe. On 15 December, she was transferred to the 15th Flotilla based at Plymouth.

Tynedale took part in the St. Nazaire Raid on 27 March 1942 as one of the escorts for the destroyer Campbeltown and small craft which were to enter the harbour. South west of Ushant she sighted the U-boat U-593 and attacked her initially with depth charges and then, when the submarine was forced to the surface, with a deck gun. However the submarine managed to dive again and escaped. It would be the same submarine U-593 which would sink Tynedale the following year. When rendezvousing with the surviving small craft from the raid outside the harbour Tynedale and another destroyer, Atherstone engaged the five German torpedo boats of the 5th Flotilla.

Tynedale returned to Plymouth on 29 March, along with the rest of the convoy that had survived. She underwent repairs and resumed duties on 18 April, continuing with convoy escorts in the Southwest Approaches. On 14 May, she encountered the German auxiliary cruiser Stier, and was part of the task force that sank it, albeit only as a support vessel. She also participated in a support role in the sinking of the German auxiliary cruiser Komet in October.

=== 1943 ===
Tynedale was nominated for service in the Mediterranean, and as part of Destroyer Division 59 (which she joined on 8 March 1943) she guarded convoys between Gibraltar and Algeria. She acted as an interceptor during the Allied invasion of Sicily, and aided in the rescuing of 218 passengers from the Dutch freighter Felix Jan Van Manix which was torpedoed and sank in October.

During convoy escorts with convoy KMS34 on 12 December 1943, Tynedale was torpedoed off Jijel, Algeria, by U-593 commanded by Kptlt. Gerd Kelbling, the same boat which it had damaged at St. Nazaire. The ship broke in two, and despite rescue efforts by other ships, 73 crewmen died (seven officers and 63 men). U-593 was chased, but sank another Hunt-class destroyer, Holcombe, before being forced to the surface and scuttled the following day.

== See also ==
- Tynedale

== Publications ==
- Colledge, J. J.; Warlow, Ben (2006) [1969]. Ships of the Royal Navy: The Complete Record of All Fighting Ships of the Royal Navy from the 15th Century to the Present (3rd Rev ed.). London: Chatham Publishing. ISBN 978-1-86176-281-8. OCLC 67375475.
