= HMS Calpe (L71) =

Destroyer of the Royal Navy

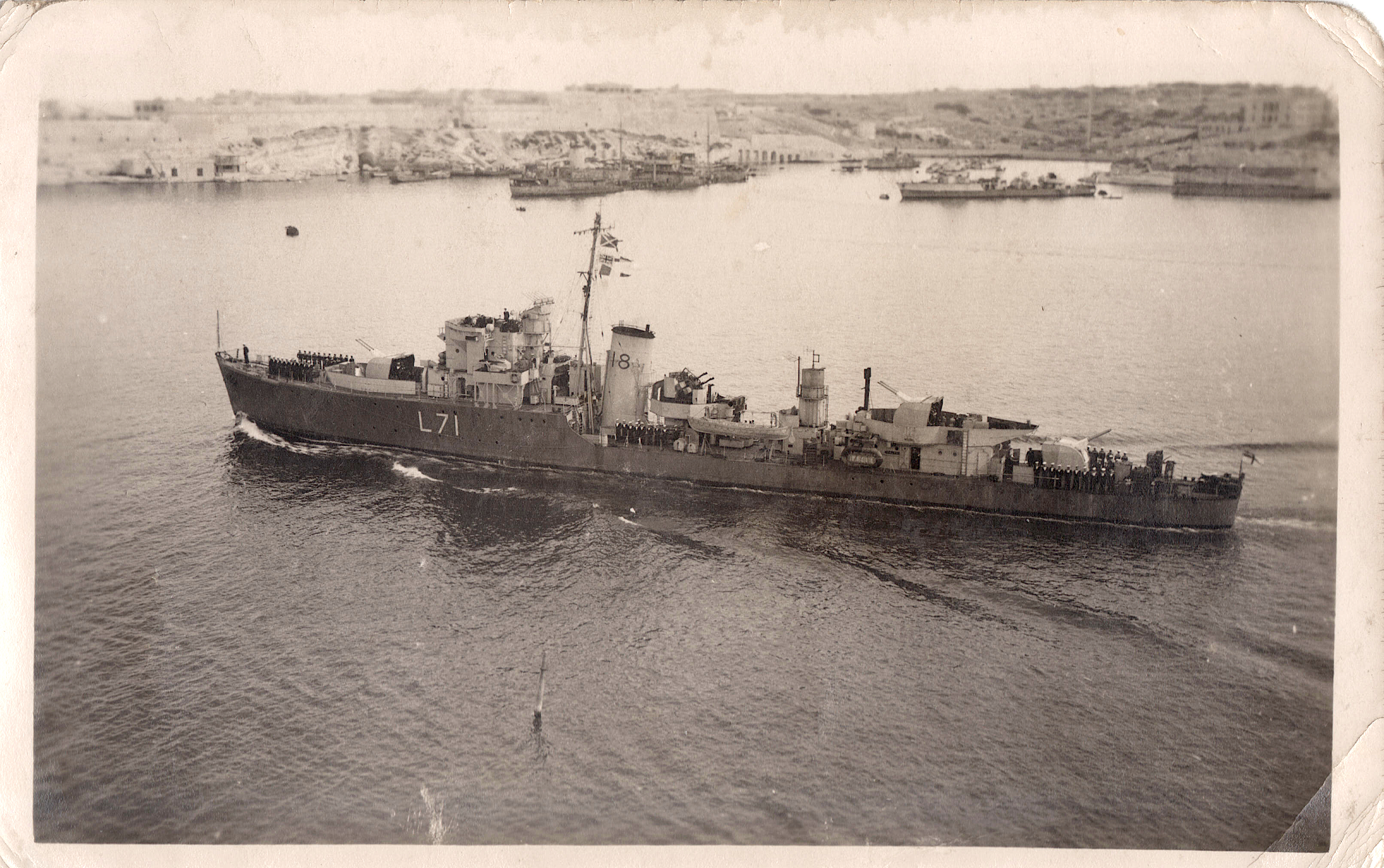
- HMS Calpe departing Malta for the United Kingdom, 6 November 1945

History

United Kingdom
- Name: HMS Calpe
- Ordered: December 1939
- Builder: Swan Hunter (Wallsend)
- Laid down: 12 June 1940
- Launched: 28 April 1941
- Commissioned: 11 December 1941
- Identification: Pennant number: L71
- Fate: Sold to the Royal Danish Navy in 1952

Denmark
- Name: HDMS Rolf Krake
- Acquired: 1952
- Commissioned: 1954
- Decommissioned: 1962
- Identification: Pennant number: F342
- Fate: Scrapped in 1966

General characteristics
- Class & type: Type II Hunt-class destroyer
- Displacement: 1,050 tons standard; 1,490 tons full load
- Length: 85.34 m (280.0 ft)
- Beam: 9.62 m (31.6 ft)
- Draught: 2.51 m (8 ft 3 in)
- Propulsion: 2 shaft Parsons geared turbines; 19,000 shp
- Speed: 25.5 knots (47.2 km/h; 29.3 mph)
- Range: 3,600 nmi (6,670 km) at 14 knots (26 km/h)
- Complement: 164
- Armament: 6 × QF 4-inch (100 mm) Mark XVI guns on twin mounts Mk. XIX; AAA - 2 x 4 12.7 mm Vickers, 2 x 20 mm Oerlikon guns; 6 Thornycroft depth charge throwers

HMS Calpe (pennant number L71) was a British Royal Navy Type II Hunt-class destroyer escort. Built as a result of the outbreak of World War II, Calpe escorted convoys during the war and participated in the Dieppe Raid. Calpe is an old name for Gibraltar. Collaborating with USS Wainwright on 13 December 1943, she assisted in the sinking of German U-boat U-593. Calpe was loaned and then sold to the Danish Navy, remaining active until she was scrapped in Sweden in 1966.

== History ==
Calpe was ordered in December 1939 from Swan Hunter Wallsend as part of the 1939 emergency program. She was not the first ship of this name as HMS Calpe had been a ship in the Royal Navy from 1800 to 1802. The keel was laid the following year and it was launched and completed in 1941. Following her acceptance on 11 December 1941, the ship set sail for Scapa Flow. The ship was adopted in February 1942 by Abingdon-on-Thames in Berkshire as part of a National Savings campaign called Warship Week.

In 1942 she sailed under the Spanish Ensign as she approached St Jean de Luz. To keep up the pretense, all the crew remained below deck. It was not until before the bombardment took place on 4–5 April that the British Ensign replaced the Spanish jack. On 28 July, Calpe and HMS Cottesmore shelled and sunk the Vorpostenboot V 202 Hermann Bösch in the English Channel off La Hague, Manche, France.

On 18 and 19 August 1942 Calpe was involved in the Dieppe Raid. Her primary function was to act as the command ship for the raid and was used by Major-General Roberts (OC, 2nd Canadian Infantry Division) and Captain John Hugues-Hallet RN (Naval Commander for the raid). She acted as a hospital ship and sustained casualties, losing nearly a quarter of the crew. Despite this, Calpe managed to take on and care for 278 casualties.

In October 1942, Calpe was included in the ships that would take part in action in North Africa. She was sent to guard a convoy to her namesake Gibraltar. In November she became part of Operation Torch as she was included in the Central Task Force for allied landings.

Calpe identified the submarine U-593 in the Mediterranean, and together with USS Wainwright, managed to sink the U-boat on 13 December 1943. The U-boat had already sunk two sister Hunt-class destroyers, Tynedale and Holcombe that month. The captain of Wainwright, Commander Strohbehn, noted in his account that "it was a pleasure" to work with the British ship.

== Postwar ==
Calpe was active in the Indian Ocean until 1946. She was sent back to Britain in the November and was put in "reserve". She was laid up in Sheerness and moved to Portsmouth in 1947. During 1952 she was placed on loan with the Royal Danish Navy for nine years becoming HDMS Rolf Krake. Then Denmark bought her outright. Rolf Krake remained active until October 1966 when she was scrapped at Ystad in Sweden.

== Legacy ==
The Government of Gibraltar issued both a 5p and a 22p stamp to celebrate Calpe. The name Calpe was reused in 1965 when the Royal Navy Reserve formed its only HQ reserve unit in Gibraltar.

== Publications ==
- Colledge, J. J.; Warlow, Ben (2006) [1969]. Ships of the Royal Navy: The Complete Record of All Fighting Ships of the Royal Navy from the 15th Century to the Present (3rd Rev ed.). London: Chatham Publishing. ISBN 978-1-86176-281-8. OCLC 67375475.
