= USS Wainwright (DD-419) =

Sims-class destroyer

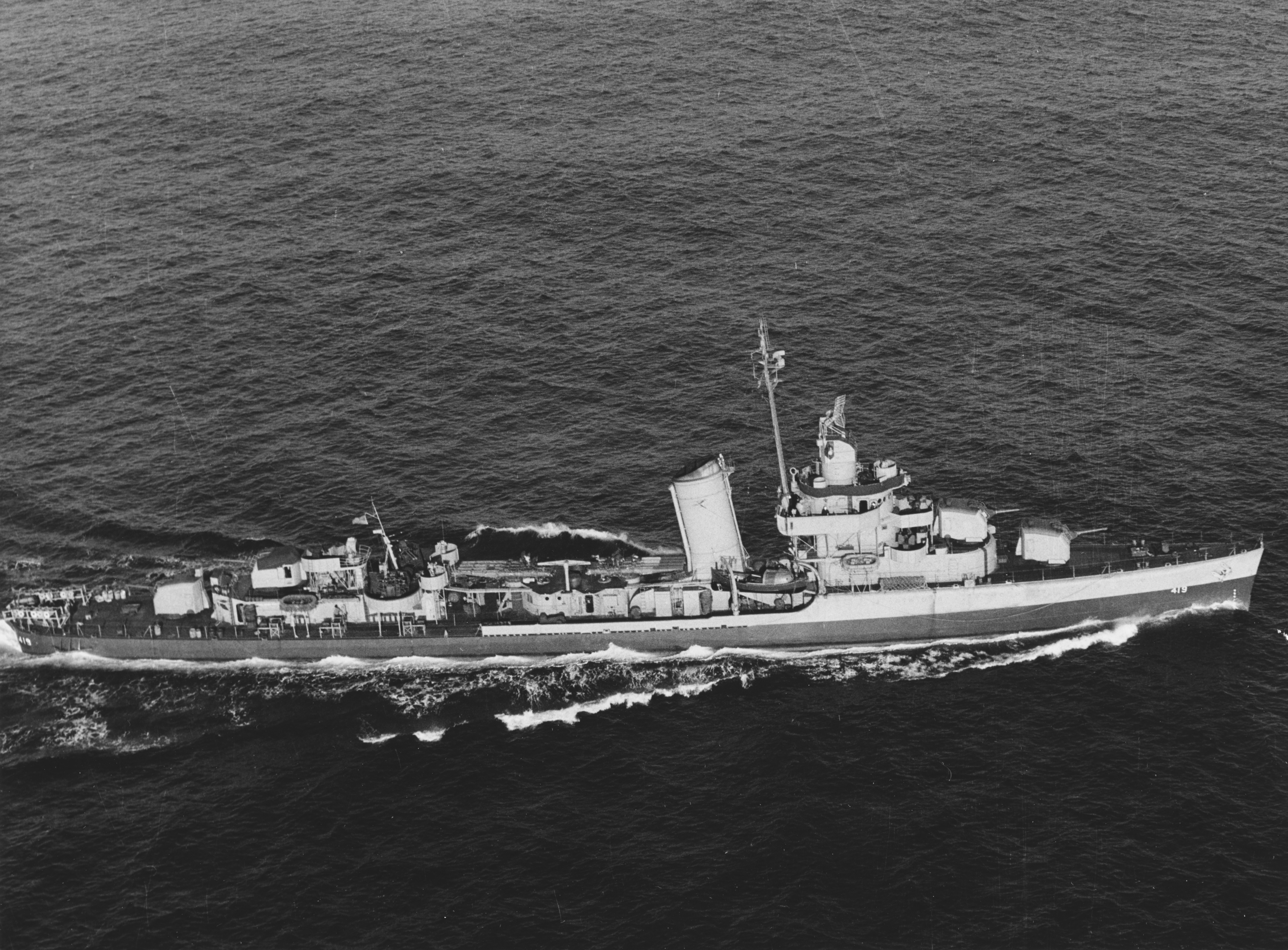
- Wainwright on 5 May 1944

History

United States
- Builder: Norfolk Navy Yard
- Laid down: 7 June 1938
- Launched: 21 June 1939
- Commissioned: 15 April 1940
- Decommissioned: 29 August 1946
- Stricken: 13 July 1948
- Honors and awards: American Defense Service Medal ("Fleet" clasp, "A" device), European-African-Middle Eastern Campaign Medal (7 stars), Asiatic-Pacific Campaign Medal, World War II Victory Medal, Navy Occupation Service Medal ("Asia" clasp)
- Fate: Sunk as target 5 July 1948 after exposure to Operation Crossroads atomic tests

General characteristics
- Class & type: Sims-class destroyer
- Displacement: 1,570 long tons (1,600 t) (std); 2,211 long tons (2,246 t) (full)
- Length: 348 ft 3 1/4 in (106.2 m)
- Beam: 36 ft 1 in (11.0 m)
- Draft: 13 ft 4.5 in (4.1 m)
- Propulsion: High-pressure super-heated boilers; Geared turbines with twin screws; 50,000 hp (37,000 kW)
- Speed: 35 knots (65 km/h; 40 mph)
- Range: 3,660 nmi (6,780 km; 4,210 mi) at 20 kn (37 km/h; 23 mph)
- Complement: 192 (10 officers/182 enlisted)
- Armament: 5 × 5 inch/38, in single mounts; 4 × .50 caliber/90, in single mounts; 8 × 21 inch torpedo tubes in two quadruple mounts; 2 × depth charge track, 10 depth charges

USS Wainwright (DD-419) was a World War II-era Sims-class destroyer in the service of the United States Navy. The ship was named to honor Lieutenant Jonathan Mayhew Wainwright, Jr., USN; his son, Master Jonathan Wainwright, III, USN; his cousin, Commander Richard Wainwright, USN; and also Rear Admiral Richard Wainwright, USN.

Wainwright was laid down on 7 June 1938 at the Norfolk Naval Shipyard; launched on 1 June 1939; sponsored by Mrs. Henry Meiggs; and commissioned on 15 April 1940.

== Service history ==
=== World War II ===
Following shakedown, Wainwright began duty with the Atlantic Fleet in conjunction with the Neutrality Patrol which had been established by President Franklin D. Roosevelt soon after World War II broke out in Europe early in September 1939 to keep hostilities from spreading to the Western Hemisphere. Just before the opening of hostilities between Japan and the United States, Wainwright embarked upon a mission which indicated an acceleration in America's gradual drift into the Allied camp. She departed Halifax, Nova Scotia, on 10 November, as a unit of the screen for Convoy WS-12X, an all-American ship convoy transporting British and Commonwealth troops via the Cape of Good Hope to Basra in the Near East. The convoy steamed first to Trinidad in the British West Indies, in order that the "short-legged" destroyers might refuel there before beginning the long South Atlantic leg of the voyage to Cape Town. There, the convoy was to be turned over to the British Admiralty for orders and protection, and the destroyers were to turn around and head home.

The convoy reached Cape Town on 9 December 1941, two days after the Japanese attack on Pearl Harbor and two days before Germany and Italy declared war on the United States. This change in the strategic picture caused changes in the destinations of the transports. Some went to Suez and thence to Australia while other carried reinforcements to the doomed "fortress" of Singapore. The escorting American destroyers headed back to the United States, but this time they put to sea as full-fledged belligerents.

==== 1942 ====
Upon her return to the east coast, Wainwright resumed her patrols. Her assignment, however, took on a new complexion. No longer simply trying to prevent the spread of hostilities to the Western Hemisphere, she patrolled instead to protect America's shorelines and seagoing traffic along her coast from Germany's undersea fleet. That duty continued until mid-March 1942, when the warship received orders to join the British Home Fleet as part of an American force composed of Wasp, North Carolina, Washington, Tuscaloosa, Wichita, and seven other destroyers. On 25 March, she departed Casco Bay, Maine, in company with Wasp, Washington, Wichita, Tuscaloosa and the destroyers of Destroyer Squadron 8 (DesRon 8), with Commander DesRon 8 (ComDesRon 8) embarked. (This US Navy involvement allowed the Royal Navy to release ships for the invasion of Madagascar.) The task unit reached Scapa Flow, in the Orkney Islands north of the British Isles, on 3 April.

Until the fall of 1942, Wainwright participated in convoy operations between Iceland, Orkney, and northern Russia. During this period, she had frequent brushes with Luftwaffe planes and Kriegsmarine submarines. Her most famous and most successful encounter with the enemy came three months after she arrived in European waters while the destroyer was protecting the North Russia convoys. She was then part of the covering force for the ill-fated Convoy PQ 17, making the run from Iceland to Archangel. The force, built around London, Tuscaloosa, Wichita, Norfolk, Wainwright, Rowan, and seven British destroyers, departed Seydisfjord, Iceland, on 1 July.

PQ 17 suffered Luftwaffe and submarine attacks on 2 and 3 July, but Wainwright did not get involved directly until 4 July. In mid-afternoon, the destroyer joined the convoy to refuel from Aldersdale. On her way to the rendezvous, the warship assisted the convoy in repulsing two torpedo-plane raids. During the first, her long-range fire kept the six enemy planes at a distance sufficient to make their torpedo drops wholly inaccurate. The second was a desultory, single-plane affair in which the warship easily drove off the lone torpedo bomber. During the ensuing dive-bombing attack, she evaded the enemy handily, the nearest bomb landing at least 150 yards (140 m) away.

After that attack, a two-hour lull in the action allowed Wainwright to resume her original mission, refueling, but the enemy returned at about 1820. At the sight of 25 Heinkel He 111s milling about on the southern horizon, the warship turned to port to clear the convoy. At that juncture, the Heinkels divided themselves into two groups for the attack; one on her starboard quarter and the other on her starboard bow. Wainwright took the group off her quarter under fire at extreme range, about 10,000 yards (9.1 km) distant, and maintained her fire until it endangered the convoy. At that juncture, she shifted her attention to the more dangerous bow attack. Her fire on that group proved so effective that only one plane managed to penetrate her defenses to make his drop between Wainwright and the convoy. All the others prudently dropped their torpedoes about 1,000 yards (900 m) to 1,500 yards (1,400 m) from the destroyer. That resulted in a torpedo run to the convoy itself in excess of 4,000 yards (4,000 m). The ships in the convoy easily evaded the torpedoes approaching from the bow, but the torpedoes coming from the starboard quarter found their marks, William Hooper and Azerbaidjan. Wainwright, though, had put up a successful defense. Her antiaircraft gunners damaged three or four enemy planes and generally discouraged the raiders from pressing home their attack with the vigor necessary for greater success.

Not long after that attack, at about 1900, Wainwright parted company with convoy PQ 17 to rejoin her own task unit, then heading off to meet the supposed threat posed by the possible sortie of a German surface force built around Tirpitz, Admiral Scheer, and Admiral Hipper. Convoy PQ 17, naked to the enemy after the Support Force withdrew to meet a danger which never materialized, scattered. Each ship tried to make it to northern Russia as best she could. Luftwaffe planes and Kriegsmarine submarines saw that few succeeded. After more than three weeks of individual hide-and-seek games with the Germans, the last groups of PQ 17 ships straggled into Archangel on 25 July. Operation Rosselsprung as the Germans dubbed the action, had proved an overwhelming success. It cost the Allies over two-thirds of the ships in PQ 17. Wainwright's brief association with the convoy probably saved several other ships.

Wainwright continued to escort Atlantic convoys through the summer and into the fall of 1942. No action like that she encountered on 4 July occurred. It was not until the first large amphibious operation of the European-African-Middle Eastern theater came along in November that she again engaged the Axis.

For the invasion of French Morocco, Wainwright was assigned to the four-destroyer screen of the Covering Group (Task Group 34.1) built around Massachusetts, Tuscaloosa, and Wichita. Assembled at Casco Bay, Maine, that group got underway on 24 October and, two days later, rendezvoused with the remainder of Task Force 34 (TF 34), which had sortied from Hampton Roads. The task force reached the Moroccan coast on the night of 7/8 November. The invasion was scheduled for the pre-dawn hours of the following morning. The Covering Force drew the two-fold mission of protecting the transports in the event of a sortie by French heavy surface units based at Dakar and of preventing a sortie by the French light forces based at Casablanca.

For Wainwright, the Naval Battle of Casablanca opened just before 0700 on 8 November when her antiaircraft gunners joined those of the other ships of the Covering Force in chasing away two Vichy French planes. Later that morning, the Casablanca-based cruiser Primauguet, destroyers and submarines sortied against the landings, already in progress at Fedhala. Wainwright joined Massachusetts, Tuscaloosa, Wichita and the other three destroyers in stopping that attack. Their efforts cost the French dear, four Vichy destroyers and eight submarines were sunk while the light cruiser and two destroyer-leaders suffered severe damage. In addition to her part in the engagement with the French warships, Wainwright also participated in the intermittent gun duels with batteries ashore.

For the next three days, Wainwright remained off the Moroccan coast supporting the invasion. The Army invested Casablanca by the night of 10 November, and the French capitulated late the following morning. On 12 November, the Covering Force, with Wainwright in the screen, sailed for home. The destroyer arrived in New York on 21 November and immediately began a two-week repair period.

==== 1943 ====
Next, after a brief training period, the warship resumed duty with transatlantic convoys. For the next six months, she busied herself protecting merchant ships making the voyage to North African ports. During her stay in Casablanca after one such voyage, she played host to a group of Moroccan dignitaries including Sidi Mohammed, the Sultan of Morocco. During another convoy operation, she helped screen Convoy UGS-6 which lost five of its 45 ships to U-boat torpedoes. When not engaged in Atlantic convoy duty, she trained with other ships of the Atlantic Fleet and underwent brief repairs in various American ports.

In June 1943, Wainwright returned to North Africa for convoy duty between ports along the Mediterranean coast of North Africa which occupied her until the invasion of Sicily in July. For that operation, Wainwright was assigned to TG 80.2, the Escort Group. The force arrived off the Sicilian coast on the night of 9/10 July, and the assault troops went ashore the following morning. During the campaign, Wainwright protected the transports from enemy air and submarine activity. While she was patrolling off Palermo on 26 July, a formation of twin-engine Junkers Ju 88 medium bombers attacked her group. Two near misses flooded both main engine rooms in Mayrant, and Wainwright joined in escorting the stricken warship into port under tow. Later, she supported the "leap-frog" amphibious moves employed by Major General George S. Patton in his rampage across northern Sicily to the Strait of Messina. During her stay in Sicilian waters, the destroyer also supported mine-sweeping operations and conducted anti-shipping sweeps. In mid-August, she returned to North Africa at Mers-el-Kébir, Algeria, where she remained until early September. On 5 September, she resumed convoy duty, this time between North Africa and Sicily, frequently warding off Luftwaffe air raids. Italy proper had been invaded early in September, and late in October, the warship was called upon to bombard enemy installations around Naples in support of the 5th Army’s advance on that city.

She resumed convoy duty soon thereafter. Her next noteworthy contact with the enemy came on 13 December. While conducting an antisubmarine sweep 10 miles (16 km) north of Algiers in company with Niblack, Benson, and Calpe, she made contact with U-593. First Wainwright and then Calpe attacked with depth charges. Those attacks brought the submarine to the surface, and Wainwright's gun crews went to work on her. In less than two minutes, the German crew began to abandon their vessel. Wainwright responded with a boarding party. The American sailors rescued survivors but failed to save the U-boat. After returning to Algiers and delivering her prisoners to British authorities there, she resumed convoy and patrol duties in North African waters.

==== 1944 ====
At the beginning of 1944, she provided support for the troops trying to break out of the beachheads at Anzio and Nettuno on the Italian mainland. Those duties occupied her until early February when she received orders to return to the United States. She steamed homeward in company with Ariel (AF-22) and Niblack via Ponta Delgada in the Azores, arrived at New York on 12 February, and entered the navy yard there for a three-week overhaul. When that chore was finished on 6 March, the destroyer began 13 months of escort and training duty along the eastern seaboard.

==== 1945 ====
That routine ended on 27 April 1945 when she passed through the Panama Canal into the Pacific Ocean. After a stop at San Diego, California and exercises out of Pearl Harbor, the warship headed for the western Pacific. She reached Ulithi on 13 June and for the next two months sailed between various islands in the area. She visited Iwo Jima, Okinawa, Saipan, Guam, and Eniwetok. On 12 August, she departed the last-named atoll in company with TF 49 bound for the Aleutian Islands. While she was at sea, the Japanese capitulation ended hostilities. Four days later, the ship steamed into Adak, Alaska. She remained there until the last day of the month when she got underway with TF 92, bound for Honshū, Japan. Wainwright arrived in Ominato Ko on 12 September and began a six-week tour of duty in support of the occupation forces. That duty ended on 30 October, and the warship headed back toward the United States.

=== Post-War ===
After stops at Midway Atoll and Pearl Harbor, Wainwright pulled into San Diego on 16 December.

The destroyer remained at San Diego in an inactive status until the spring of 1946. At that time, she was designated a target ship for the atomic tests to be conducted at Bikini Atoll that summer. She survived both blasts at Bikini in July. On 29 August 1946, she was decommissioned. Wainwright remained at Bikini almost two years under intermittent inspection by scientists evaluating the effects of the Operation Crossroads tests. Finally, she was towed out to sea in July 1948 and sunk as a target on 5 July. Her name was struck from the Naval Vessel Register on 13 July 1948.

== Awards ==
- American Defense Service Medal with "FLEET" clasp and "A" device
- European-African-Middle Eastern Campaign Medal with seven battle stars
- Asiatic-Pacific Campaign Medal
- World War II Victory Medal
- Navy Occupation Medal with "ASIA" clasp
