= German submarine U-593 =

German World War II submarine

History

Nazi Germany
- Name: U-593
- Ordered: 16 January 1940
- Builder: Blohm & Voss, Hamburg
- Yard number: 569
- Laid down: 17 December 1940
- Launched: 3 September 1941
- Commissioned: 23 October 1941
- Fate: Sunk on 13 December 1943

General characteristics
- Class & type: Type VIIC submarine
- Displacement: 769 tonnes (757 long tons) surfaced; 871 t (857 long tons) submerged
- Length: 67.10 m (220 ft 2 in) o/a; 50.50 m (165 ft 8 in) pressure hull
- Beam: 6.20 m (20 ft 4 in) o/a; 4.70 m (15 ft 5 in) pressure hull
- Height: 9.60 m (31 ft 6 in)
- Draught: 4.74 m (15 ft 7 in)
- Installed power: 2,800–3,200 PS (2,100–2,400 kW; 2,800–3,200 bhp) (diesels); 750 PS (550 kW; 740 shp) (electric)
- Propulsion: 2 shafts; 2 × diesel engines; 2 × electric motors
- Speed: 17.7 knots (32.8 km/h; 20.4 mph) surfaced; 7.6 knots (14.1 km/h; 8.7 mph) submerged
- Range: 8,500 nmi (15,700 km; 9,800 mi) at 10 knots (19 km/h; 12 mph) surfaced; 80 nmi (150 km; 92 mi) at 4 knots (7.4 km/h; 4.6 mph) submerged
- Test depth: 230 m (750 ft); Crush depth: 250–295 m (820–968 ft)
- Complement: 4 officers, 40–56 enlisted
- Armament: 5 × 53.3 cm (21 in) torpedo tubes (four bow, one stern); 14 × torpedoes or 26 TMA mines; 1 × 8.8 cm (3.46 in) deck gun (220 rounds); 1 x 2 cm (0.79 in) C/30 AA gun

Service record
- Part of: 8th U-boat Flotilla; 23 October 1941 – 28 February 1942; 7th U-boat Flotilla; 1 March – 31 October 1942; 29th U-boat Flotilla; 1 November 1942 – 13 December 1943
- Identification codes: M 38 214
- Commanders: Kptlt. Gerd Kelbling; 23 October 1941 – 13 December 1943
- Operations: 16 patrols: 1st patrol: 2 – 28 March 1942; 2nd patrol: 20 April – 18 June 1942; 3rd patrol: 22 July – 19 August 1942; 4th patrol: 3 – 15 October 1942; 5th patrol: 2 – 16 November 1942; 6th patrol: 29 November – 31 December 1942; 7th patrol: 6 February – 8 March 1943; 8th patrol: 13 – 21 March 1943; 9th patrol: 25 March – 4 April 1943; 10th patrol: a. 8 – 23 April 1943; b. 24 – 28 April 1943; 11th patrol: 13 June – 11 July 1943; 12th patrol: 27 July – 8 August 1943; 13th patrol: 15 September – 5 October 1943; 14th patrol: 26 October – 7 November 1943; 15th patrol: 25 – 29 November 1943; 16th patrol: 1 – 13 December 1943
- Victories: 9 merchant ships sunk (38,290 GRT); 4 warships sunk (2,954 tons); 1 merchant ship total loss (8,426 GRT); 1 warship total loss (1,625 tons); 1 merchant ship damaged (4,853 GRT); 2 warship damaged (1,677 tons)

German submarine U-593 was a Type VIIC U-boat built for Nazi Germany's Kriegsmarine for service during World War II. She was laid down on 17 December 1940 by Blohm & Voss in Hamburg as yard number 569, launched on 3 September 1941 and commissioned on 23 October under Kapitänleutnant Gerd Kelbling.

The boat's service began on 23 October 1941 with training as part of the 8th U-boat Flotilla. She was transferred to the 7th flotilla on 1 March 1942 and moved on to the 29th flotilla on 1 November.

== Design ==
German Type VIIC submarines were preceded by the shorter Type VIIB submarines. U-593 had a displacement of 769 tonnes (757 long tons) when at the surface and 871 tonnes (857 long tons) while submerged. She had a total length of 67.10 m (220 ft 2 in), a pressure hull length of 50.50 m (165 ft 8 in), a beam of 6.20 m (20 ft 4 in), a height of 9.60 m (31 ft 6 in), and a draught of 4.74 m (15 ft 7 in). The submarine was powered by two Germaniawerft F46 four-stroke, six-cylinder supercharged diesel engines producing a total of 2,800 to 3,200 metric horsepower (2,060 to 2,350 kW; 2,760 to 3,160 shp) for use while surfaced, two BBC GG UB 720/8 double-acting electric motors producing a total of 750 metric horsepower (550 kW; 740 shp) for use while submerged. She had two shafts and two 1.23 m (4 ft) propellers. The boat was capable of operating at depths of up to 230 metres (750 ft).

The submarine had a maximum surface speed of 17.7 knots (32.8 km/h; 20.4 mph) and a maximum submerged speed of 7.6 knots (14.1 km/h; 8.7 mph). When submerged, the boat could operate for 80 nautical miles (150 km; 92 mi) at 4 knots (7.4 km/h; 4.6 mph); when surfaced, she could travel 8,500 nautical miles (15,700 km; 9,800 mi) at 10 knots (19 km/h; 12 mph). U-593 was fitted with five 53.3 cm (21 in) torpedo tubes (four fitted at the bow and one at the stern), fourteen torpedoes, one 8.8 cm (3.46 in) SK C/35 naval gun, 220 rounds, and a 2 cm (0.79 in) C/30 anti-aircraft gun. The boat had a complement of between forty-four and sixty.

== Service history ==
U-593 made 16 patrols between March 1942 and December 1943, and sank 13 ships, for a total of 38,290 GRT and 2,954 tons. She made three patrols in the Atlantic from her base in Germany and from St Nazaire in occupied France, and sank three ships. She briefly clashed with British forces on their way to the St Nazaire Raid in March 1942. In October U-593 transferred to the Mediterranean and from various bases there made a further 13 patrols, sinking 8 merchant ships and 4 naval vessels, before being sunk in December 1943.

== Fate ==
U-593 departed Toulon on 1 December 1943 for her 16th war patrol. On 12 December she intercepted convoy KMS 34, outbound from Gibraltar, off the coast of Algeria. Making an attack she hit the escorting destroyer Tynedale, but was pursued by other escorts who engaged in a Swamp operation. During the 32 hour hunt U-593 torpedoed Holcombe, one of her pursuers, but was caught by the destroyers Wainwright and Calpe off Bougie, Algeria. In the afternoon of 13 December she was forced to the surface with depth charges and abandoned. All her crew escaped, and were picked up by the Allied ships. (Note: The position of her sinking is given variously as 37°58′N 05°58′E (Kemp) and 37°38′N 05°58′E (Niestle))

== Wolfpacks ==
In addition she took part in three wolfpacks, namely:

- Steinbrinck (3 – 11 August 1942)
- Lohs (11 – 17 August 1942)
- Tümmler (3 – 11 October 1942)

== Summary of raiding history ==
Date	Ship Name	Nationality	Tonnage (Note: Merchant ship tonnages are in gross register tons. Military vessels are listed by tons displacement.)	Fate
14 May 1942	Stavros	Greece	4,853	Damaged
25 May 1942	Persephone	Panama	8,426	Total loss
5 August 1942	Spar	Netherlands	3,616	Sunk
12 November 1942	Browning	United Kingdom	5,332	Sunk
18 March 1943	Dafila	United Kingdom	1,940	Sunk
18 March 1943	Kaying	United Kingdom	2,626	Sunk
27 March 1943	City of Guildford	United Kingdom	5,157	Sunk
11 April 1943	Runo	United Kingdom	1,858	Sunk
22 June 1943	USS LST-333	United States Navy	1,625	Total loss
22 June 1943	USS LST-387	United States Navy	1,625	Damaged
5 July 1943	Devis	United Kingdom	6,054	Sunk
5 July 1943	HMS LCM-1123 (Note: Being carried by Devis.)	Royal Navy	52	Sunk
5 July 1943	HMS LCM-1129	Royal Navy	52	Damaged
21 September 1943	William W. Gerhard	United States	7,176	Sunk
7 September 1943	USS Skill	United States Navy	815	Sunk
3 November 1943	Mont Viso	Free France	4,531	Sunk
12 December 1943	HMS Tynedale	Royal Navy	1,000	Sunk
12 December 1943	HMS Holcombe	Royal Navy	1,087	Sunk

== See also ==
- Mediterranean U-boat Campaign (World War II)

== Bibliography ==
- Blair, Clay (1998). Hitler's U-Boat War: The Hunted 1942-1945. Cassell. ISBN 0-304-35261-6.
- Busch, Rainer; Röll, Hans-Joachim (1999). German U-boat commanders of World War II : a biographical dictionary. Translated by Brooks, Geoffrey. London, Annapolis, Md: Greenhill Books, Naval Institute Press. ISBN 1-55750-186-6.
- Busch, Rainer; Röll, Hans-Joachim (1999). Der U-Boot-Krieg, 1939-1945: Deutsche U-Boot-Verluste von September 1939 bis Mai 1945 [German U-boat losses from September 1939 to May 1945] (in German). Vol. IV. Hamburg, Berlin, Bonn: Mittler. ISBN 3-8132-0514-2.
- Gröner, Eric; Jung, Dieter; Maass, Martin (1991). German Warships 1815-1945: U-boats and Mine Warfare Vessels. Vol. 2. Translated by Thomas, Keith; Magowan, Rachel. London: Conway Maritime Press. ISBN 0-85177-593-4.
- Edwards, Bernard (1996). Dönitz and the Wolf Packs – The U-Boats at War. London, UK: Cassell Military Classics. pp. 89, 91–93. ISBN 0-304-35203-9.
- Kemp, Paul (1997). U-Boats Destroyed, German submarine losses in the World Wars. Arms and Armour. ISBN 1-85409-515-3.
- Niestle, Axel (1998). German U-Boat Losses During World War II. Greenhill. ISBN 1-85367-352-8.
