= SS Annibal Benévolo =

Brazilian-owned cargo ship, sunk by a U-boat in 1942

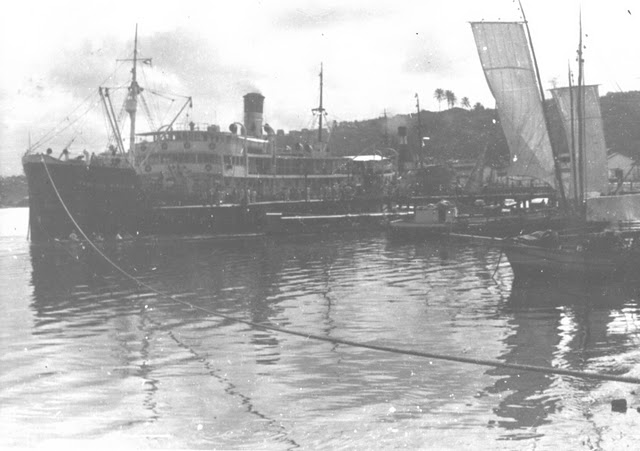
- Annibal Benévolo in port

History

Brazil
- Name: 1905: Jupiter; 1917: Ruy Barbosa; 1923: Commandante Alvim; 1931: Annibal Benévolo
- Namesake: 1917: Ruy Barbosa
- Owner: 1905: Cia de Nav Cruzeiro do Sul; 1910: Cia de Nav Lloyd Brasileiro
- Port of registry: 1905: Santos; 1910: Rio de Janeiro
- Builder: Reiherstiegwerft, Hamburg
- Yard number: 415
- Completed: April 1905
- Identification: by 1934: call sign PUAU
- Fate: sunk by torpedo, August 1942

General characteristics
- Class & type: Saturno-class cargo and passenger ship
- Tonnage: 1,905 GRT, 984 NRT
- Length: 269.0 ft (82.0 m)
- Beam: 37.8 ft (11.5 m)
- Depth: 11.5 ft (3.5 m)
- Decks: 1
- Installed power: 2 × triple-expansion engines: 156 NHP
- Propulsion: 2 × screws
- Speed: 12 knots (22 km/h)
- Crew: 71

Annibal Benévolo was a cargo and passenger steamship. It was built in Germany in 1905 for Brazilian owners as Jupiter. Lloyd Brasileiro bought it in 1910, and renamed it three times: as Ruy Barbosa in 1917; Commandante Alvim in 1923 or 1924; and Annibal Benévolo in 1931.

In August 1942, the German submarine U-507 sank Annibal Benévolo; killing 150 of the people aboard; including 16 children. There were only four survivors. U-507 had sunk two other Brazilian cargo-passenger ships the day before; also with great loss of life; and sank two more Brazilian ships the next day. The resulting public outrage in Brazil led directly to Brazil declaring war on Germany and Italy a week later.

== Saturno-class steamships ==
In 1904 and 1905, three German shipyards built a class of four twin-screw steamships for the Companhia de Navegação Cruzeiro do Sul ("Southern Cross Navigation Company"). Howaldtswerke in Kiel built the lead ship of the class, Saturno, in 1904; and also built Sirio in 1905. Also in 1905, Blohm+Voss in Hamburg built Orion; and Reiherstiegwerft, also in Hamburg, built Jupiter. The four ships were all the same length; almost the same beam; and all except Orion were almost the same depth.

== Building and registration ==
Reiherstiegwerft built Jupiter as yard number 415, and completed her in April 1905. Her registered length was 269.0 ft (82.0 m); her beam was 37.8 ft (11.5 m); her depth was 11.5 ft (3.5 m); and her tonnages were 1,905 GRT and 984 NRT. Each of her twin screws was driven by a three-cylinder triple-expansion engine. The combined power of her twin engines was rated at 156 NHP, and gave her a speed of 12 knots (22 km/h). Cia de Nav Cruzeiro do Sul registered her in Santos.

== Changes of owner and name ==
In 1910, Companhia de Navegação Lloyd Brasileiro bought Jupiter, Saturno, and Sirio; and registered them in Rio de Janeiro. In August 1914, Jupiter grounded on the coast of Santa Catarina in southern Brazil. She was refloated, repaired, and in 1917 was renamed Ruy Barbosa, after the Brazilian politician and jurist Ruy Barbosa.

In 1923 or 1924, Ruy Barbosa was renamed Commandante Alvim. In 1931 she was renamed after Brazilian Army Lieutenant Aníbal Benévolo, who was a tenentist rebel who took part in the Rio Grande do Sul Revolt of 1924, and was killed that November. Lieutenant Benévolo's forename is usually written as Aníbal, with a single "n", but the ship was registered with Annibal spelt with a double "n". By 1934, Annibal Benévolo's wireless telegraph call sign was PUAU.

== Loss ==
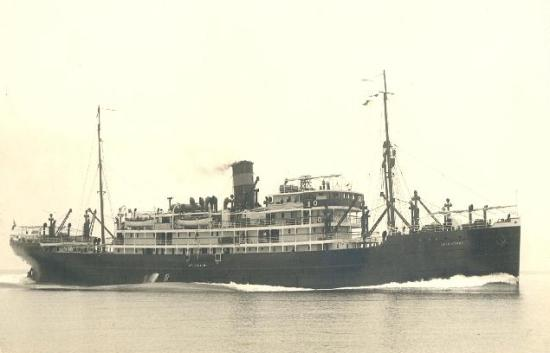
Araraquara, sunk by the same U-boat a few hours before Annibal Benévolo

In January 1942, Brazil severed diplomatic relations with Germany, Italy, and Japan. Brazil remained neutral, but in February 1942, German U-boats started to sink Brazilian merchant ships. On 15 August, U-507 sank two Brazilian ships; Baependy and Araraquara; off the coast of Brazil; causing great loss of life. Both ships were sunk too swiftly to transmit a distress signal.

On 15 August, Annibal Benévolo left Salvador for Aracaju; one hour after Araraquara; and headed in the same direction. Annibal Benévolo's Master was Captain Henrique Jacques Mascarenhas da Siveira. Her complement comprised 70 other officers and men, and she carried 83 passengers, including 16 children. In the small hours of 16 August, Annibal Benévolo was about 7 nautical miles (13 km) off the mouth of the River Real. All of her passengers would have been asleep in their cabins. At 04:13 hrs local time, (or 09:13 hrs Central European Time, which the Kriegsmarine used), U-507 hit her with two torpedoes: one in her engine room; and the other aft. She sank within two minutes, at position 11°41′S 37°21′W. All of her passengers were killed, along with all but four of her crew.

The survivors included Captain da Siveira, who was on deck with his Chief Officer when the ship was torpedoed. da Siveira tried to launch one of the lifeboats, while the Chief Officer ran to the bridge to sound the alarm. However, the ship sank so quickly that da Siveira was thrown into the sea, and sucked underwater. He surfaced, and found a piece of floating wreckage to which to cling. He then found one of Annibal Benévolo's four liferafts, with which he rescued two crewmen from the water. Another crewman survived by clinging to a piece of floating wreckage, which drifted more than 10 kilometres (5 nmi), and brought him ashore the next day.

== Reaction ==
On 18 August, the Brazilian Departamento de Imprensa e Propaganda ("Department of Press and Propaganda") released the news that a U-boat had sunk several Brazilian merchant ships, killing hundreds of people. By then, U-507 had sunk not only Baependy; Araraquara; and Annibal Benévolo; but also the cargo ships Itagiba and Arará. Arará was sunk while trying to rescue survivors from Itagiba.

Brazilians were outraged. There were popular protests in major cities; including Rio de Janeiro; where Foreign Minister Oswaldo Aranha publicly demanded that President Getúlio Vargas declare war on the Axis countries. On 22 August, after a ministerial meeting, Vargas declared a "state of belligerence" against Germany and Italy, formalized by Decree-Law No. 10,508, issued on 31 August 1942. Brazil did not declare war on Japan, as it had no evidence of Japan attacking Brazilian ships.

== Bibliography ==
- Lloyd's Register of British and Foreign Shipping. Vol. I.–Steamers. London: Lloyd's Register of Shipping. 1907 – via Internet Archive.
- Lloyd's Register of British and Foreign Shipping. Vol. I.–Steamers. London: Lloyd's Register of Shipping. 1910 – via Internet Archive.
- Lloyd's Register of Shipping. Vol. I.–Steamers. London: Lloyd's Register of Shipping. 1914 – via Internet Archive.
- Lloyd's Register of Shipping. Vol. I.–Steamers. London: Lloyd's Register of Shipping. 1917 – via Internet Archive.
- Lloyd's Register of Shipping. Vol. II.–Steamers and Motor Vessels. London: Lloyd's Register of Shipping. 1923 – via Internet Archive.
- Lloyd's Register of Shipping. Vol. II.–Steamers and Motorships of 300 tons gross and over. London: Lloyd's Register of Shipping. 1931 – via Southampton City Council.
- Lloyd's Register of Shipping. Vol. II.–Steamers and Motorships of 300 tons gross and over. London: Lloyd's Register of Shipping. 1934 – via Southampton City Council.
- Sander, Roberto (2007). O Brasil na mira de Hitler: a história do afundamento de navios brasileiros pelos nazistas (in Portuguese). Rio de Janeiro: Objetiva. ISBN 978-85-7302-868-3.
