= Brazil in World War II =

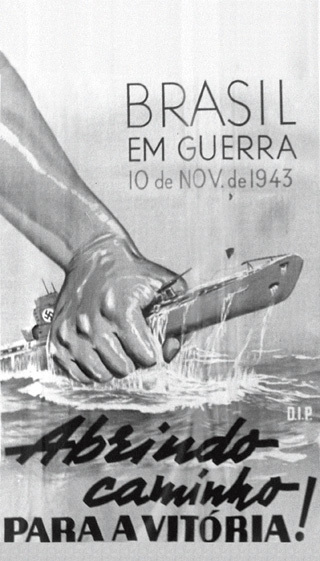
Brazilian propaganda poster announcing the declaration of war on the Axis powers on November 10, 1943. The caption reads: "Brazil at war. Opening the way to victory!"

Brazil officially entered World War II on August 22, 1942, when it declared war against the Axis powers, including Germany and Italy. On February 8, 1943, Brazil formally joined the Allies upon signing the Declaration by United Nations. Although considered a secondary Allied power, Brazil was the largest contributor from South America, providing essential natural resources, hosting strategic air and naval bases, participating in the Battle of the Atlantic, and deploying the Brazilian Expeditionary Force (FEB) to the Italian Campaign, the only South American country to send combat troops overseas.

Leading up to the outbreak of World War II in 1939, Brazil adhered to a policy of strict neutrality and maintained positive commercial and diplomatic relations with both Allied and Axis powers. Despite Brazil's traditionally strong ties with the United States, by 1940 the country had become Germany's leading export market outside Europe and its ninth largest trading partner. Brazil hosted significant and influential German, Italian, and Japanese diaspora communities, and Brazilian President Getúlio Vargas, whose administration was ideologically sympathetic to fascism, initially aimed to profit from the war by securing favorable trade agreements from both sides.

Brazil's foreign policy progressed through three different phases. Brazil used its relative freedom in the first phase (1935–1940) to play Germany and the United States against one another. As the conflict progressed, Brazil's trade with the Axis powers led to increased diplomatic and economic pressure from the Allies. Following the entry of the United States into the war in December 1941, the Joint Brazil–U.S. Defense Commission was established to strengthen bilateral military ties and minimize Axis influence.

In exchange for direct economic assistance from the United States, Brazil severed diplomatic relations with Germany, Japan, and Italy in January 1942, and allowed the establishment of U.S. air bases on Brazilian soil to counter Axis naval activities, which provoked immediate reprisals from the Axis powers. By mid-August 1942, 36 Brazilian merchant ships had been sunk, with the loss of nearly 2,000 seafarers and passengers, prompting Brazil to declare war.

Although Brazil's economy and military were relatively underdeveloped, the country committed significant industrial capacity and some armed forces to the war effort. From mid-1942 until the conclusion of World War II, the Brazilian Navy and Air Force actively contributed to protecting Allied shipping from bases in Brazil's northeast region.

Between September 1944 and May 1945, Brazil deployed 25,700 troops to the Italian front. In the conflict, Brazil lost 1,889 soldiers and sailors, 31 merchant ships, three warships, and 22 fighter aircraft. Brazil's participation in the war enhanced its global prestige and marked its emergence as a significant international power.

== Overview ==
Brazil's maritime losses were a significant factor in its decision to declare war on Germany and Italy. The country's traditional isolationist stance naturally positioned it against "disturbers of the international order and trade." Public sentiment and government actions culminated in Brazil's declaration of war on Nazi Germany and Fascist Italy in August 1942. That same year, US incentives and diplomatic pressure led to the establishment of airbases along the northeastern coast of Brazil.

At the time, Brazil's population was predominantly rural and faced high levels of illiteracy, with an economy centered on commodity exports. The country lacked the industrial, medical, and educational infrastructure necessary to fully support the war effort. The FEB, which was planned following the Potenji River Conference and the Casablanca Conference, was not formally established until a year after the declaration of war.

=== Deployment ===
The FEB was deployed to the front in July 1944, nearly two years after Brazil's declaration of war, and was integrated into the Allied 15th Army Group. Of the 100,000 troops originally planned, about 25,000 were sent to Italy. Upon arrival, the FEB, trained and equipped by US forces, carried out the primary missions assigned by the Allied command.

== Pre-involvement ==
=== Predecessors ===
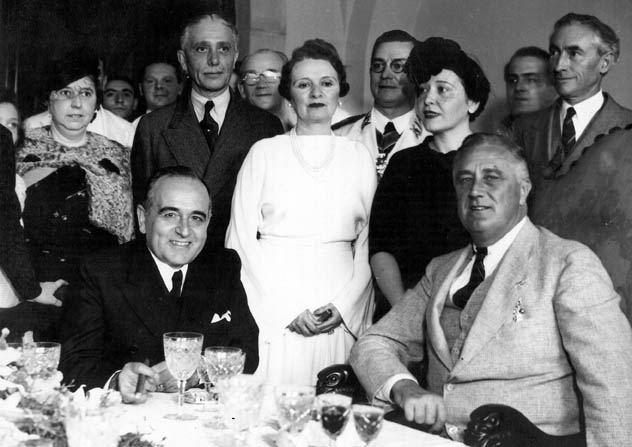
Getúlio Vargas (seated left) and Franklin D. Roosevelt (seated right), Rio de Janeiro, 1936

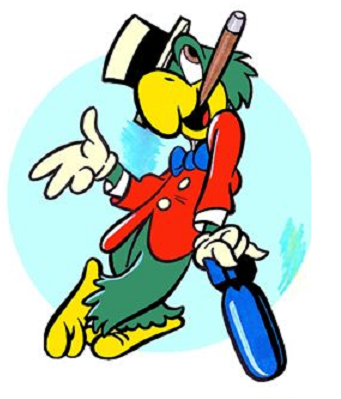
José Carioca, created by Walt Disney as part of the Good Neighbor policy, seen here in the emblem of 387th Tactical Fighter Squadron in 1943

In February 1942, German and Italian submarines began targeting Brazilian ships in the Atlantic Ocean. This was influenced by Brazil's adherence to the Atlantic Charter, which mandated automatic alignment with any nation in the Americas attacked by a foreign power.

Brazil's gradual alignment with the United States was significant for its government, especially in light of German and Italian attempts to interfere in Brazilian internal affairs. The implementation of the Estado Novo made it increasingly difficult to maintain stable trade relations with these countries, particularly due to British and later US naval pressure. An element of this pressure was President Franklin D. Roosevelt's Good Neighbor policy, which included economic and commercial incentives such as financing the construction of the Companhia Siderúrgica Nacional (CSN). Reports at the time stated that the United States had planned to invade the northeast of Brazil (Plan Rubber) if Getúlio Vargas insisted on maintaining Brazil's neutrality.

As a consequence of Brazil's entry into the war, the government created internment camps in various cities across the country to intern Italians, Japanese, and Germans suspected of posing a risk to national security.

In 1942, following the US proposal to finance the CSN, US forces established airbases along Brazil's North-Northeast coast. The most notable of these was at Natal, near Parnamirim, in the state of Rio Grande do Norte, known as the "Trampoline of Victory" ("Trampolim da Vitória" in Portuguese). This base played a crucial role in the Allied war effort, particularly before the Allied landing in North Africa in November 1942 in Operation Torch. With the stabilization of the Italian front and the diminishing German submarine threat by late 1943, the US bases in Brazil were gradually deactivated in 1944 and 1945. However, the US maintained a presence on Fernando de Noronha until 1960.

=== Brazilian ships sunk ===
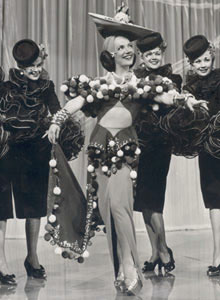
Carmen Miranda was considered the muse of the "Good neighbor policy" of rapprochement with Latin America, which influenced Brazilian participation in World War II on the Allied side.

Attacks by Axis submarines on Brazilian ships between 1941 and 1944 resulted in the deaths of over a thousand individuals and were a key factor in Brazil's entry into World War II. Until that point, Brazil had maintained a neutral stance. In this period, thirty-five Brazilian ships were targeted, with thirty-two being sunk. (Note: There is no consensus as to the exact number of ships attacked. Some sources include certain events and rule out others. For example, the website "Poder Naval" lists 38 ships. The sinking of Taubaté and Shangri-lá are not included. However, it mentions the sinking of two unidentified ships, one in June 1942, by U-159, and another in August 1942, by U-507, as well as the sinking of White Swan, whose torpedoing was not officially confirmed, as well as the corvette Camaquã and the Bahia, which sank for reasons other than acts of war. The World War II portal mentions 39 events, including Shangri-lá, two unidentified ships, the corvette Camaquã, and Bahia, leaving out Taubaté. In some sources, Commander Lira is also not mentioned, likely because the ship was not sunk. Roberto Sander, in his book O Brasil na mira de Hitler lists 34 ships, leaving out Paracuri.) The frequency of attacks increased markedly after Brazil severed diplomatic relations with the Axis powers on January 28, 1942. The situation escalated dramatically in August 1942, when six ships were sunk within just two days, causing over 600 casualties. This surge in attacks prompted Brazil to officially declare war on the Axis on August 22, 1942.

In 1943, despite significant enhancements in patrolling and anti-submarine warfare measures through joint Brazilian and US operations, Axis submarines continued their assaults in the South Atlantic, particularly off the coasts of São Paulo and Rio de Janeiro. The majority of the targeted vessels were merchant or mixed cargo and passenger ships, primarily belonging to major shipping companies such as Lloyd Brasileiro, Lloyd Nacional, and Costeira. (Note: In September 1942, the private companies Cia. de Navegação Costeira and Lloyd Nacional - both owned by the same owner - were taken over by the government and incorporated into the assets of the state-owned Lloyd Brasileiro.) Smaller shipping companies and regional shipowners were also affected, (Note: They were: Cia. Carbonífera Sul-Riogandense; Cia. de Cabotagem de Pernambuco and Cia. Serras de Navegação.) as well as vessels owned by regional shipowners and seafarers, including the barge Jacira and the fishing boat Shangri-lá. Lloyd Brasileiro, the largest of these companies, suffered the greatest losses, with 21 of its ships attacked, and 19 sunk.

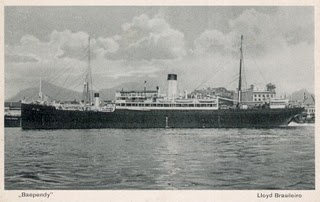
Baependi, sunk on August 15, 1942 by the German submarine U-507, causing the death of 270 people

The Brazilian Navy lost three warships in World War II:

- Vital de Oliveira: An auxiliary ship torpedoed by U-861 on July 19, 1944, while en route to Rio de Janeiro after stops in the Northeast and Espírito Santo. It was the last Brazilian ship to be torpedoed in the war;
- Camaquã: A corvette that capsized in a storm on July 21, 1944, resulting in the deaths of 23 crew members;
- Bahia: A cruiser that sank on July 4, 1945, after accidentally detonating its own depth charges in gunnery practice, with 333 casualties;

Also, the ships Cabedello and Shangri-lá did not survive the conflict.

==== "Atlantic Belt" ====
The "Atlantic Belt", the narrowest stretch between South America and Africa, was fortified to disrupt the flow of raw materials to the Axis powers, particularly along the 1,700-mile route from Natal to Dakar. This strategic corridor was referred to by the Allies as the "Northeast Ridge". To secure this area, the Allies began establishing bases in Brazil in mid-June 1941. Task Force No. 3 arrived, and the ports of Recife and Salvador were prepared for use by the US Navy. In response, the Axis powers sought to obstruct the shipment of raw materials to the United States and the United Kingdom, leading to attacks on merchant ships navigating the Atlantic.

== Pre-entry attacks ==
=== Beginning of hostilities ===
On March 22, 1941, the Brazilian merchant ship Taubaté was attacked by a German aircraft in the Mediterranean, off the coast of Egypt. This incurred Brazil's first wartime casualty, with gate clerk José Francisco Fraga being killed. On June 13, 1942, a German submarine intercepted the Brazilian merchant ship Siqueira Campos near the Cape Verde archipelago. The submarine fired on it, and allowed it to proceed only after conducting an inspection. Since 1940, Brazilian ships had been seized on three occasions—Siqueira Campos, Buarque, and Itapé—by British authorities. These seizures were conducted under various pretexts, primarily related to the transportation of goods and/or passengers of German origin. On January 18, 1941, the British captured the French merchant ship Mendoza in the safety zone off the Brazilian coast. This event prompted the Brazilian government to issue a formal protest to the British government. (Note: France at the time, was under the Vichy regime).)

The rupture of diplomatic relations and the establishment of US bases in Brazil's Northeast positioned the country as a hostile entity from the perspective of Germany and Italy. As noted by German Ambassador Pruefer, Brazil was considered to be "in a state of latent war" with the Axis powers. Consequently, Brazilian ships began to be targeted off the US coast and in the Caribbean. The initial attacks occurred on February 15 and 18, 1942, with the merchant ships Buarque (one casualty) and Olinda (no casualties), respectively. The most notable loss was Cabedello. She disappeared in the Atlantic after leaving the US on February 14, in the peak of the submarine offensive. 54 men died, and the cause of the sinking remains unknown. It has been that it was sunk by an Italian submarine; either Leonardo da Vinci; Luigi Torelli; or Comandante Cappellini. However, there is no record or evidence that it was attacked. The date of her loss is unknown. Some sources claim February 14, which is the date when she left the United States; others suggest February 25.

By the end of July, Brazil had also lost:

- Arabutan (one casualty).
- Cairu (fifty-three casualties).
- Parnahyba (seven casualties).
- Gonçalves Dias (six casualties).
- Alegrete (no casualties).
- Paracuri (no information on number of passengers or casualties).
- Pedrinhas (no casualties).
- Tamandaré (four casualties).
- Barbacena (six casualties).
- Piave (one casualty).

These attacks occurred far from the Brazilian coast, and aside from Cairu, the casualties were relatively limited. Many of these incidents involved interrogations of shipwrecked crews by German U-boat commanders, who sought information on other ships' routes and cargoes bound for the United States.

=== Attacks in the South Atlantic ===
On May 18, 1942, the Italian submarine Barbarigo launched the first attack in the South Atlantic basin near Brazil's national waters, targeting the cargo ship Commander Lira. The ship, en route from Recife to New Orleans, was torpedoed 180 nautical miles off the Fernando de Noronha archipelago. After the torpedo hit, the crew transmitted a distress signal and abandoned the ship, which was also subjected to shelling. Barbarigo left the scene, believing the ship would soon sink. However, the SOS signal was intercepted by US ships. The next morning, the US light cruiser USS Omaha arrived at the scene, boarded Commander Lira and extinguished the fire. The crew needed to steer the ship was taken back on board, and the ship was towed by the US minesweeper USS Thrush and the Brazilian Navy tugboat Heitor Perdigão to Fortaleza, where it arrived on May 25. This incident proved to be a diplomatic victory for the United States and contributed to shifting Brazilian sentiment against the Axis powers.

Two days after the attack on Commander Lira, Barbarigo engaged what its commander believed to be an US battleship, reporting its sinking. In reality, the target was the cruiser Milwaukee, which was not hit.

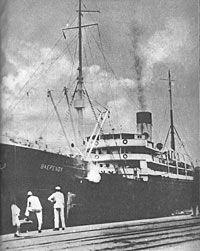
Baependi, the stage of the most significant Brazilian tragedy in the war

Following these incidents, the Italian submarine Barbarigo was targeted by a B-25 Mitchell bomber of the newly created Brazilian Air Force (FAB). This mission marked the first combat engagement in the history of the FAB. The bomber was part of the Adaptation Aircraft Grouping, a training unit organized to integrate aircraft received from the United States. The crew included a mix of US and Brazilian personnel: Captain Affonso Celso Parreiras Horta and Captain Oswaldo Pamplona Pinto from Brazil, and First Lieutenant Henry B. Schwane from the US Army Air Force.

Simultaneously, three other Italian submarines—Archimede, Cappellini, and Bagnolini—operated off the Brazilian coast. Archimede targeted the convoy of Commander Lira. Although this attack did not cause any damage, the submarine’s captain mistakenly believed he had sunk a heavy cruiser, likely confusing the detonation of a depth charge from the destroyer USS Moffett with a torpedo hit. The week's events were widely covered in the press, and US President Roosevelt congratulated Brazilian President Vargas for the nation's actions against the submarines.

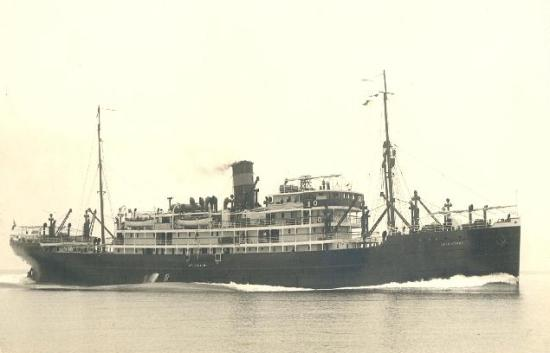
Araraquara, sunk on August 15, 1942, by the German submarine U-507, resulting in 131 deaths

By July 1942, Brazil had lost 14 ships (excluding Taubaté, which had been machine-gunned the previous year). On August 7, 1942, the German submarine command, Befehlshaber der U-Boote, issued orders for submarines in the South Atlantic, including U-507 under Captain Harro Schacht, to attack all ships entering Brazilian waters, except those from Argentina and Chile. Despite Brazil's continued neutrality, significant U.S. military forces had already established a presence in Northeast Brazil by this time.

Between August 15 and 19, U-507, operating off the coasts of Bahia and Sergipe, sank five coasters and a small boat, resulting in 607 casualties, including many women and children. This spate of attacks incited widespread outrage and shock among the Brazilian public, leading to Brazil's formal declaration of war against the Axis powers at the end of August. Subsequently, other attacks by enemy forces also resulted in significant loss of life, including those on Baependy (270 killed), Araraquara (131 killed), Annibal Benévolo (150 killed), Itagiba (36 killed), and Arará (20 killed).

== Public response ==
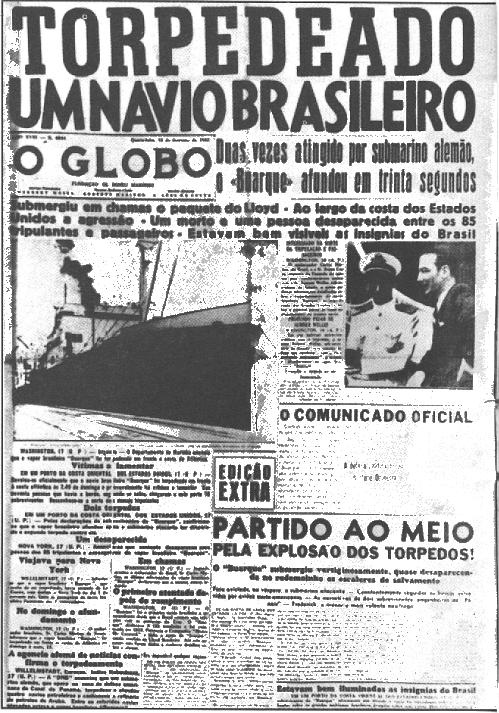
Headline in O Globo newspaper reporting the sinking of Buarque

In a matter of days, the number of casualties had more than quadrupled compared to the beginning of the year (607 versus 135). The publication of photographs depicting the dead on the beaches, along with accounts from survivors, made it evident to the population that the war had indeed reached Brazil. The headline of O Globo on August 18 read, "Challenge and Outrage to Brazil." By that time, the number of victims had already surpassed six hundred. This escalation sparked widespread panic, particularly among those needing to travel between states. The country lacked highways or railroads connecting its regions, civil aviation was in its early stages, and airports were virtually nonexistent.

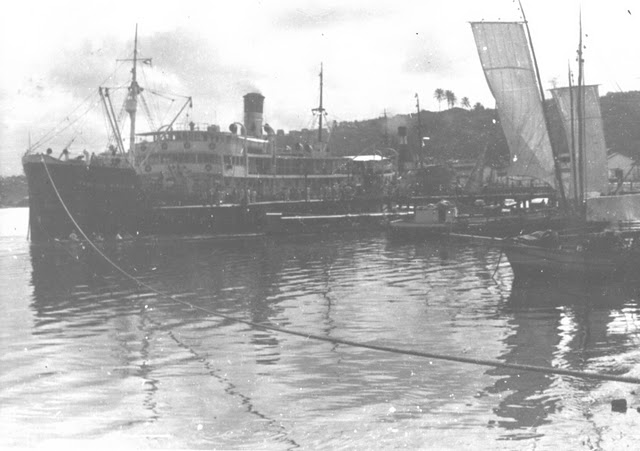
Annibal Benévolo, carrying cargo and passengers, was sunk in the early hours of August 16, 1942, by U-507, causing 150 deaths.

For many people, especially those traveling between states, the ship was one of the few and most affordable options available. Many merchant ships carried passengers, and stopovers were common, making any journey by sea a potential risk of encountering submarine attacks. For residents of the Northeast coast, the war seemed particularly immediate compared to other regions of Brazil. As the initial panic subsided, it was replaced by widespread outrage. In Rio de Janeiro, public sentiment manifested in a series of marches and rallies in 1942, where citizens demanded retaliation. Protesters converged on the Itamaraty Palace, the headquarters of the Ministry of Foreign Affairs, to voice their demands to Chancellor Oswaldo Aranha, who exclaimed to the people:

The situation created by Germany, practicing belligerent, barbaric and inhumane acts against our peaceful and coastal navigation, imposes a reaction at the level of the processes and methods employed by them against Brazilian officers, soldiers, women, children, and ships. I can assure the Brazilians who are listening to me, as to all Brazilians, that, compelled by the brutality of the aggression, we will oppose a reaction that will serve as an example to the aggressor and barbaric peoples, who violate the civilization and the life of peaceful peoples.

The National Union of Students (UNE) also organized demonstrations in major Brazilian cities, advocating for Brazil's entry into the war alongside the Allies. This public pressure compelled the hesitant government of Getúlio Vargas to act. On August 22, following a ministerial meeting, Brazil declared a "state of belligerency" against Nazi Germany and Fascist Italy, (Note: Brazil did not declare war on Japan, because it understood that Japan was not responsible for any sinking of Brazilian ships.) status formally established by Decree-Law 10,508, issued on August 31.

=== Demonstrations against immigrants from Axis countries ===
In the wake of the sinking of Brazilian ships and the resulting casualties, there was a surge of violent public demonstrations against immigrants from Axis countries, particularly Germans, Japanese, and Italians. These demonstrations included the destruction of commercial establishments owned by immigrants from Axis nations and attempts to lynch individuals suspected of having Axis affiliations. Following Brazil's entry into the war, the government intensified scrutiny of these immigrants as part of broader wartime security measures. Many immigrants, particularly those who did not speak Portuguese, were regarded with suspicion and monitored for potential espionage activities.

In this period, the Brazilian government imposed bans on newspapers and radio programs published in Axis languages. Additionally, it established detention facilities for foreigners suspected of anti-Brazilian activities, including those captured from German ships that had been damaged or seized off the Brazilian coast. The government was concerned about the potential for Axis powers to exploit their connections with immigrants and their Brazilian descendants, seeking to influence and mobilize them in support of their war efforts. In the Japanese community, this period of tension and suspicion continued even after the war. Post-war surveys indicated that a significant portion of the about 200,000 Japanese immigrants and their descendants residing in São Paulo still believed that Japan had won the conflict.

In World War II, German and Italian immigrant groups in Brazil circulated false rumors suggesting that US submarines were responsible for the attacks on Brazilian ships, in an attempt to provoke Brazil’s entry into the war. Historians have identified these claims as part of Axis propaganda efforts, orchestrated by collaborators known as the "Fifth Columns", who sought to influence public perception and decision-making in Brazil.

Documentation and historical records indicate that, in reality, German submarines were primarily responsible for the torpedoing of Brazilian ships. Throughout the war, the Brazilian Navy conducted 66 recorded attacks on German submarines in the South Atlantic. These actions sank or damaged 18 German submarines off the Brazilian coast. Nine of these — U-128, U-161, U-164, U-199, U-513, U-590, U-591, U-598, and U-662 — were officially confirmed by the German Navy as having been sunk by Brazilian naval forces.

== Entry into the war ==
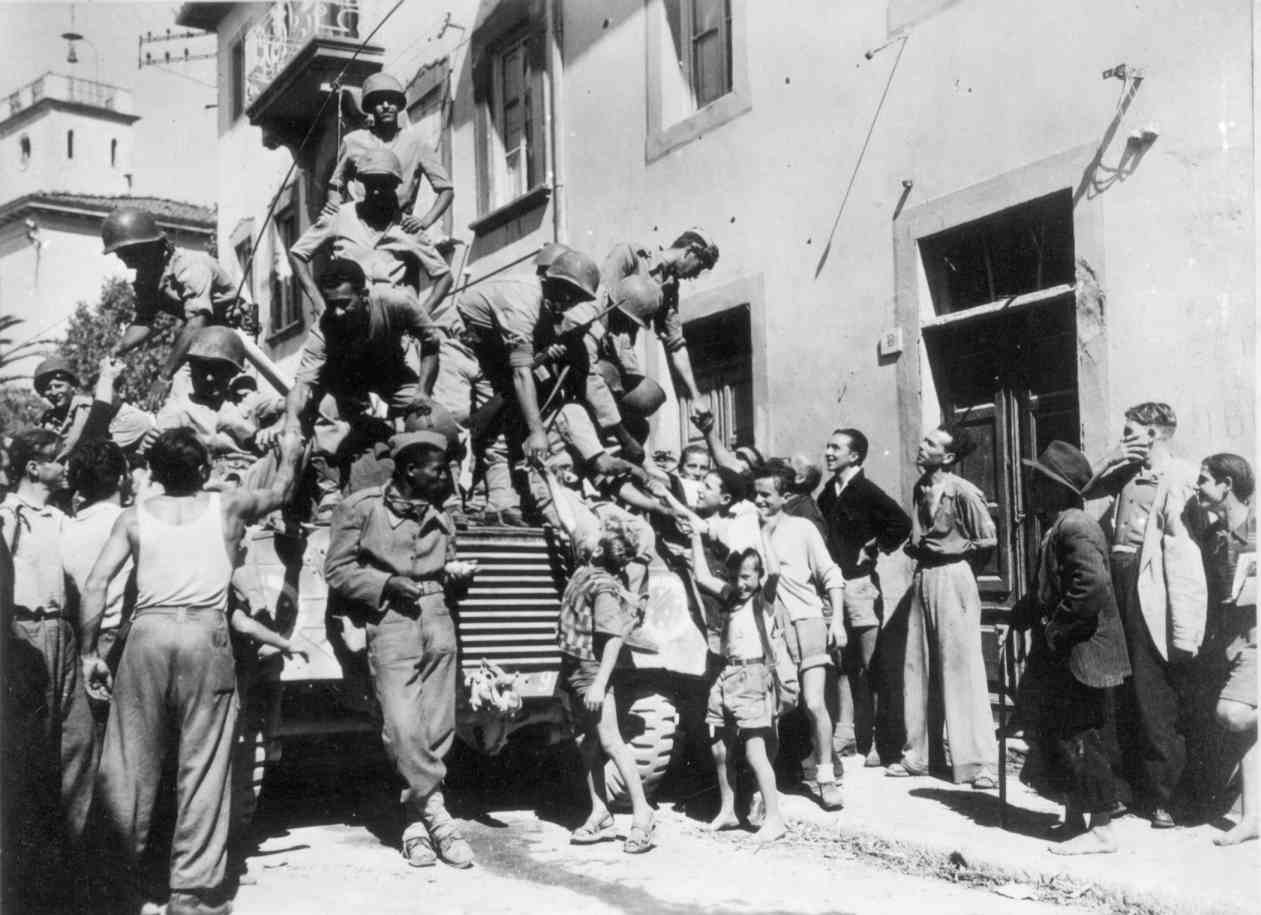
Soldiers of the Brazilian Expeditionary Force (FEB) being greeted by residents of Massarosa, Italy, in late September 1944

Before Brazil entered the war, its estimated military force strength ranged from 66,000 to 95,000 troops. Between 1939 and 1942, these troops were often distributed in regimental size units which were typically under-strength among the ten military districts. Of the total, over 62,000 were based in the triangle of Rio de Janeiro, Belo Horizonte, and São Paulo. The surrounding territory of each regiment was a common source of enlisted personnel. Most joined as draftees to fulfill their mandatory one-year service, and the army reported that half of them remained after their first tour. This is conceivable, despite the absence of statistics, because the troops were typically those who were unable to avoid service. Service could have been avoided by those who could afford to join the army-sponsored, semi-military shooting clubs, were enrolled in a university course, or had family ties.

For both officers and troops, military life was simple, even austere. Neither had high salaries. In 1942, the equivalent of $2.80 USD per month was paid to a private, $11.40 USD to a second corporal, $30.00 USD to a first sergeant, $65.00 USD to a second lieutenant, $130.00 USD to a major, $175.00 USD to a colonel, and $250.00 USD to a major-general. In contrast, the cost of living at the time was about $1.00 a month, and the minimum pay for a worker in São Paulo or Rio de Janeiro was about $0.48 per day, or $14.40 for a thirty-day work month. This allowed the Brazilian fighters to support their families in some extent just before the country's entrance into World War II.

Brazil formally entered World War II with the issuance of Decree No. 10,358 on August 31, 1942. The deployment of the FEB to the front lines began in July 1944, nearly two years after Brazil's declaration of war. The country's involvement in the war had significant repercussions, contributing to the eventual end of the Estado Novo regime.

In comparison to its participation in World War I, Brazil's involvement in World War II was more significant. The geopolitical dynamics of the war, marked by intense competition between US and German interests for Brazilian support, underscored Brazil's tactical and strategic contributions. Brazil's engagement in World War II can be viewed as more substantial than Japan's role in World War I. While Brazil's numerical and tactical contributions were greater in World War II, Japan was able to leverage its participation in World War I more effectively for political and strategic gains in the interwar years.

=== Air force ===
Brazil at War, video produced by the United States in 1943 about Brazil's participation in the war

The support provided by Brazil to the Allies through the 1st Fighter Aviation Group, established on December 18, 1943, was of considerable importance. Following their training in Aguadulce, Panama, where they participated in the Panama Canal defense campaign, the Brazilian pilots, all volunteers, went to Suffolk, New York, where they were introduced to the Republic P-47 Thunderbolt. The group, which became known as Senta a Pua!, was sent to northern Italy.

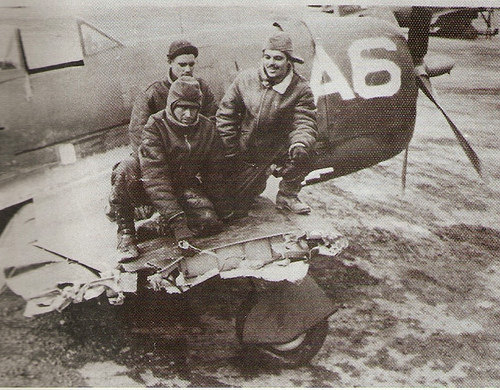
Brazilian Air Force fighter damaged after colliding with a chimney

Operations began on October 31, 1944, at the Tarquinia airfield and later relocated to Pisa, closer to the front lines. There, the group operated under the 350th Fighter Group of the United States Army Air Forces (USAAF) and was designated "Jambock". On February 10, 1945, a squadron from the 1st G.Av.Ca. targeted a large concentration of trucks, destroying 80 vehicles and three buildings. On February 20, the group assisted the FEB in capturing Monte Castello. On March 21, they achieved another success by attacking a railroad repair shop in the Po Valley, directly hitting four buildings and destroying three Savoia-Marchetti SM.79s at Galarate Field.

Initially comprising four squadrons, the group eventually operated with three. Their missions primarily involved attacking bridges, ammunition depots, and transport vehicles. While air superiority in the region was maintained by the Allies, anti-aircraft artillery presented a significant threat. Of the 48 pilots who served in the group, 22 were killed in action, and an additional four officers died in aviation accidents.

=== Attacks against Brazilian ships after the declaration of war ===
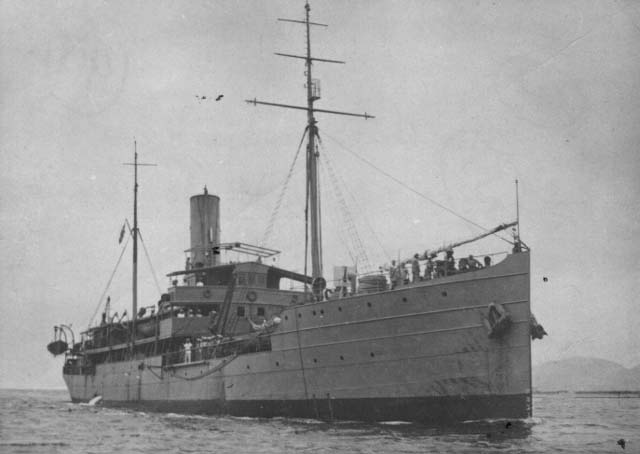
Vital de Oliveira, the last Brazilian ship – and the only Brazilian Navy ship – to be sunk in World War II

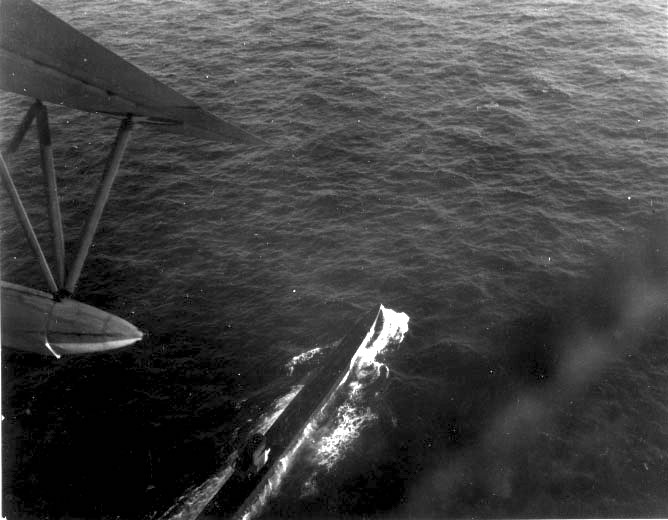
U-199 under attack from PBY Catalina in the Battle of the Atlantic, 1943

A little over a month after the most tragic sinking and less than a month after Brazil's declaration of war, three more ships were targeted by U-boats: Osório (5 casualties), Lajes (3 casualties), and Antonico (16 casualties). Following these attacks, Brazil attempted, albeit unsuccessfully, to extradite Captain Lieutenant Gerhard Wiebe and Lieutenant Markle of U-516, who were implicated in war crimes, to face justice in Brazil. On November 3, Porto Alegre was sunk off the Indian coast of South Africa, resulting in one fatality. The year ended with the sinking of Apalóide on November 22, west of the Lesser Antilles, which caused five additional deaths.

In 1943, U-507, responsible for the August massacre the previous year, was sunk on January 13, about 100 miles off the coast of Ceará, with all 54 crew members perishing. However, other ships continued to fall victim to U-boats operating off the Brazilian coast. On February 18, Brasilóide was torpedoed by U-518 off the coast of Bahia, but no-one was killed. The following day, on March 2, the Afonso Pena was sunk by the Italian submarine Barbarigo off Porto Seguro, resulting in the deaths of 125 people.

On March 2, the Natal Air Base (BANT) was established at Parnamirim Field, later known as "Trampoline of Victory" ("Trampolim da Vitória"). Although the base's activities began only on August 7, it played a crucial role in the defense of the region.

Other Brazilian vessels hit during the war included:

- Tutoia, on the first of July (7 casualties).
- Pelotaslóide (5 casualties), hit by U-590 on 4 July.
- Shangri-la, on the 22nd of July (10 casualties).
- Bagé, on the 31st of July (28 casualties).
- Itapagé, on the 26th of September (22 casualties).
- Cisne Branco, on the following day (4 casualties).
- Campos on the 23rd of October (12 casualties).

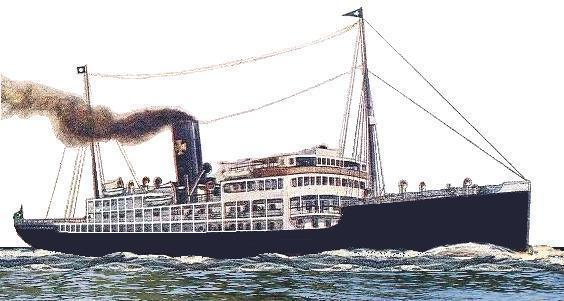
Artistic representation of the ship Itapagé, sunk on September 26, 1943

By this time, U-boats were suffering heavy losses not only along the Brazilian coast but also elsewhere. The South Atlantic Force was established, with headquarters in Recife and support bases in Natal and Fernando de Noronha. Air patrols became more effective by the end of December 1942, thanks to US and Brazilian Air Force (FAB) aircraft. The naval fleet was bolstered by US vessels. On July 20, 1944, Brazil lost Vital de Oliveira off the coast of Rio de Janeiro, the only naval ship sunk by enemy action in the war, resulting in the deaths of 99 personnel.

The submarines sunk in Brazilian territorial waters were U-590; U-662; U-507; U-164; U-598; U-591; U-128; U-161; U-199; U-513 and Archimede.

=== Italian campaign ===
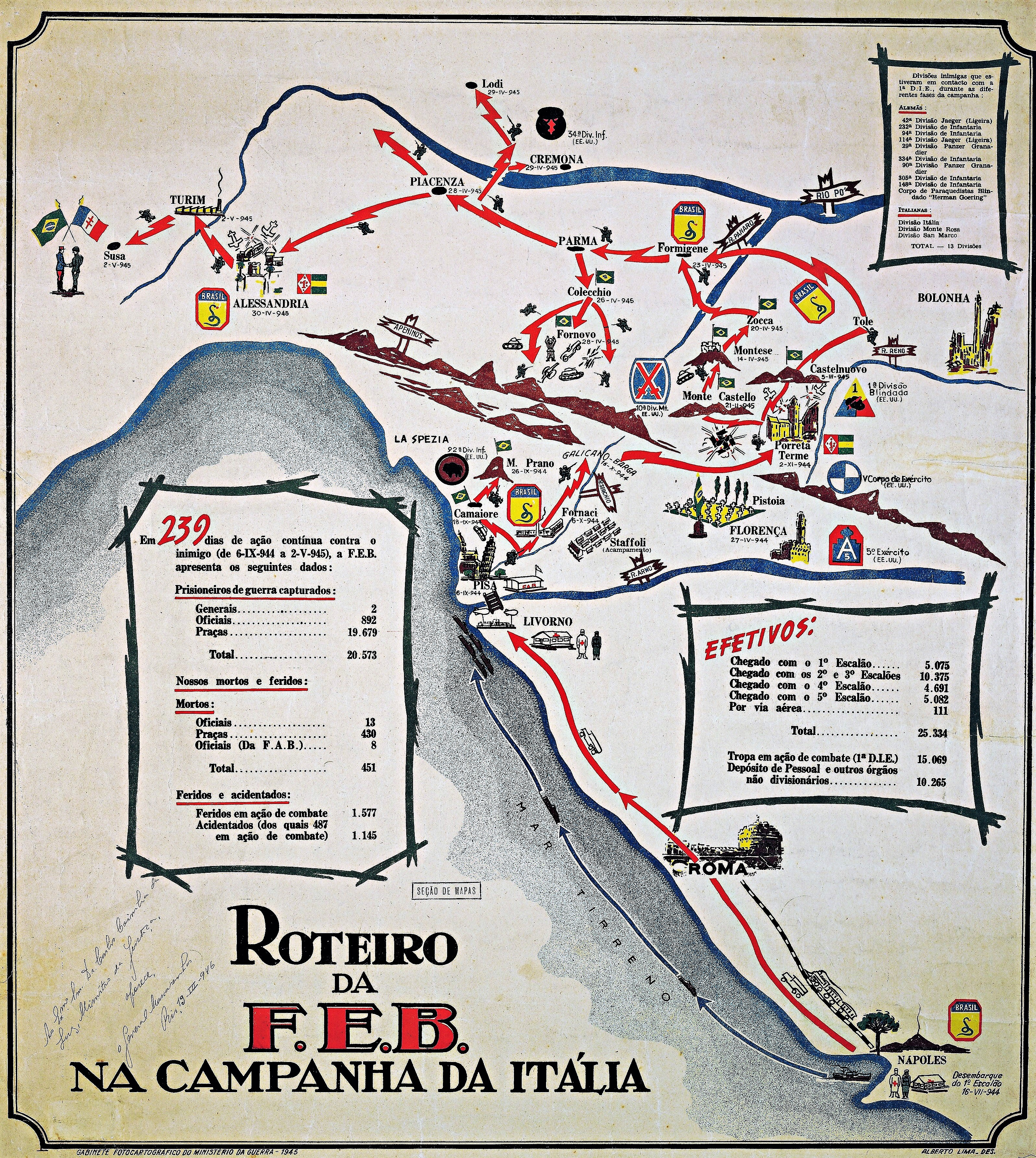
FEB's Roadmap in the Italian Campaign. National Archives

== Post-war period ==
According to historian Frank McCann, Brazil was invited to join the Allied occupation forces in Austria after World War II. However, the Brazilian government was concerned that the FEB might gain political leverage from its contributions to the Allied victory, however modest. Consequently, the government decided to officially demobilize the FEB as soon as the war ended, even while the troops were still stationed in Italy.

Upon their return to Brazil, former members of the FEB faced various restrictions. Non-military veterans, who were discharged upon their return, were prohibited from wearing their decorations or expeditionary uniforms in public. Professional military veterans were reassigned to frontier regions or areas far from major urban centers.

=== Veteran associations ===
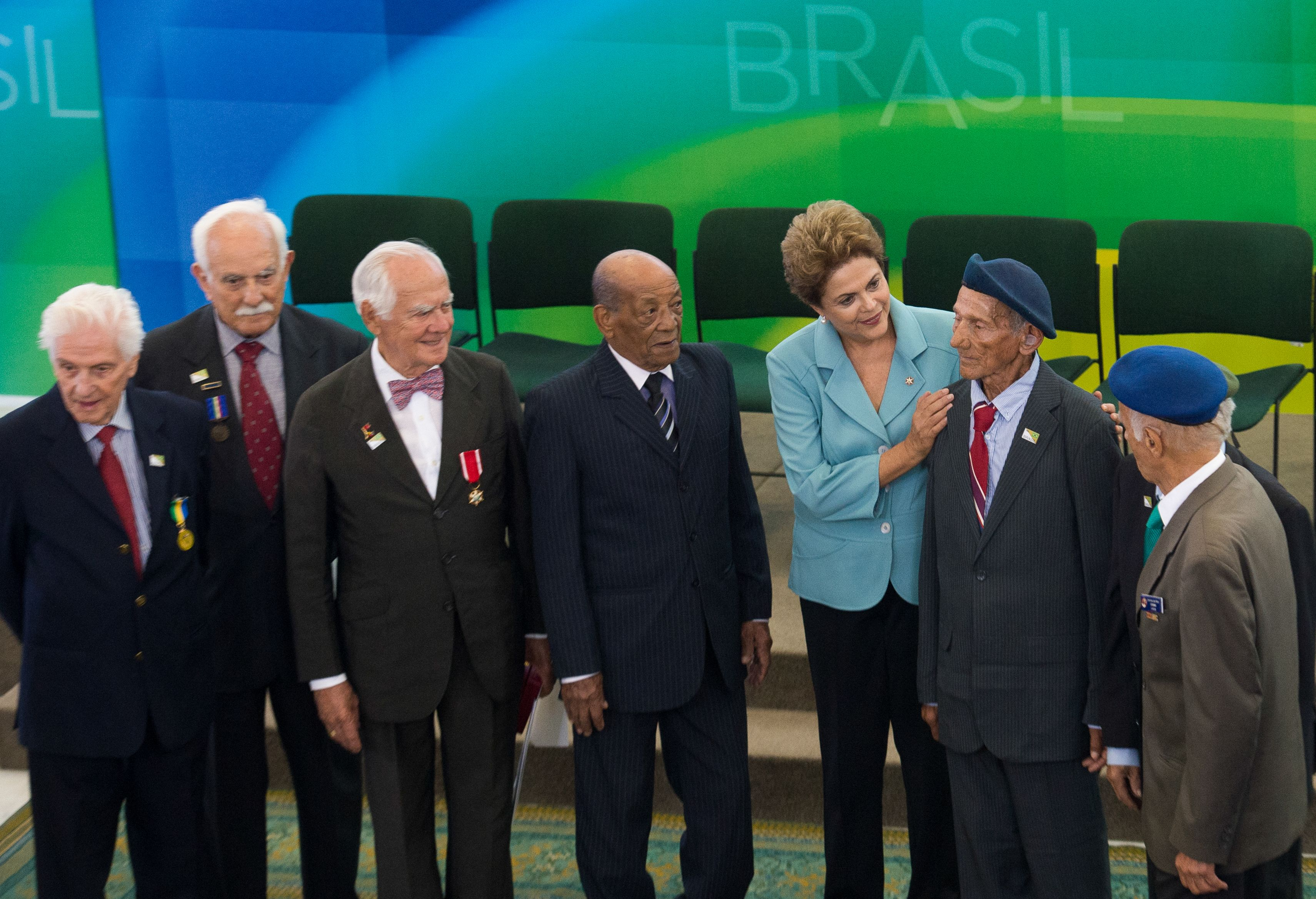
Veterans meet former President Dilma Rousseff at the ceremony commemorating the 70th anniversary of Victory Day.

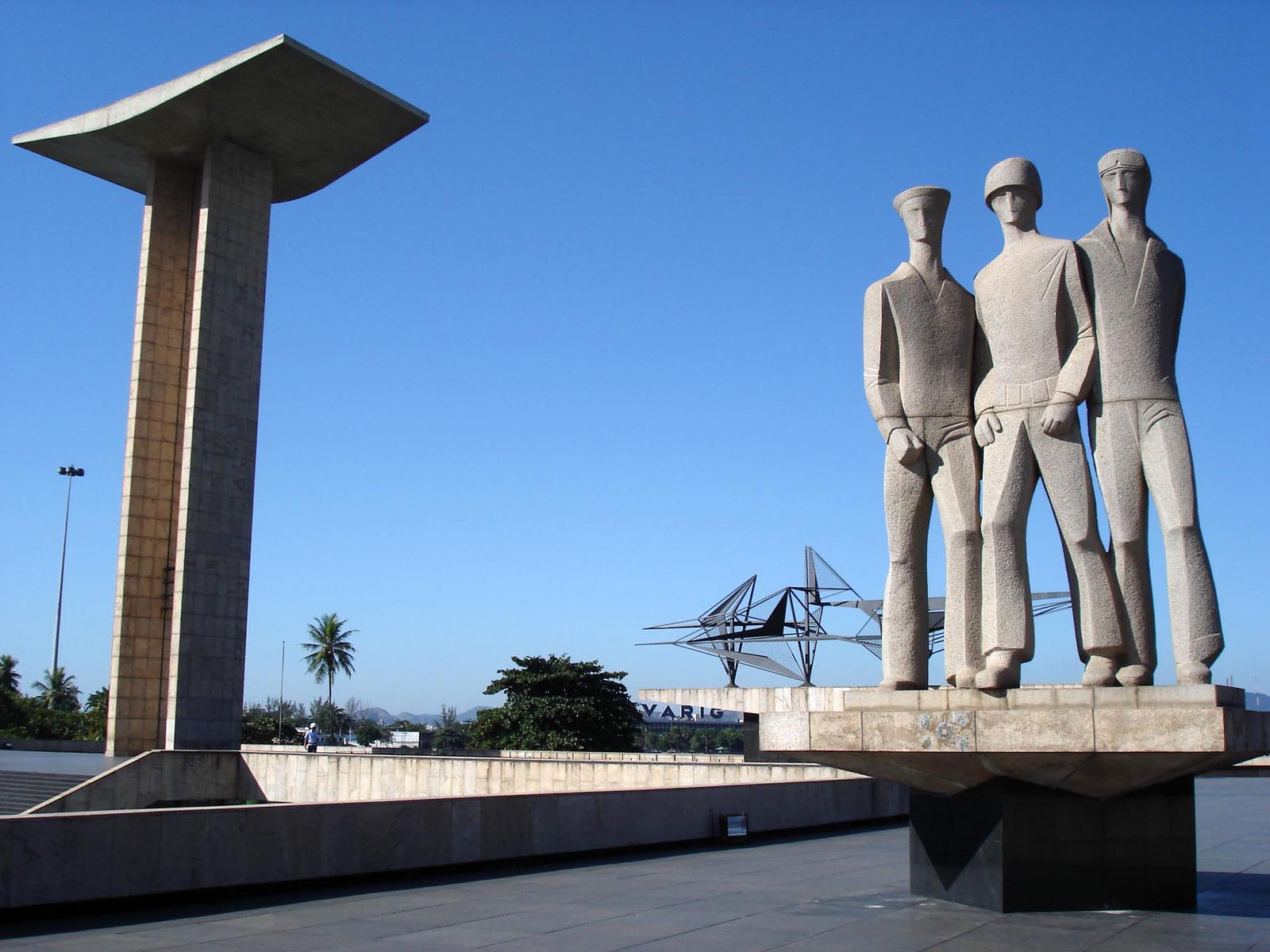
Monument to the Dead of World War II, in Rio de Janeiro, Brazil

In 1988, a pension was established for surviving Brazilian World War II veterans, granting them special compensation equivalent to the pension of a second lieutenant in the army. This benefit was extended to all surviving veterans, regardless of whether they had served in the Italian or Atlantic campaigns or had been stationed in continental Brazil in the war.

Between the end of the war and the introduction of this pension, veterans secured several modest victories. Notable achievements included the extension of civil service access to those who were illiterate (although this did not benefit a significant number of veterans) and the construction of a Housing Complex for ex-combatants in the Benfica neighborhood of Rio de Janeiro, which was inaugurated in the early 1960s. Many veterans who struggled to reintegrate into civilian life often became reliant on veterans' associations for support.

== See also ==
- Brazil during World War I
- Companhia Siderúrgica Nacional

== Bibliography ==
- Sander, Roberto (2007). O Brasil na mira de Hitler: a história do afundamento de navios brasileiros pelos nazistas [Brazil in Hitler's sights: the story of the sinking of Brazilian ships by the Nazis] (in Portuguese). Rio de Janeiro: Objetiva.
