= Alcoa (disambiguation) =

Alcoa is the company formerly known as Aluminum Company of America.

Alcoa may also refer to:

- Alorton, Illinois, formerly known as Alcoa
- Alcoa, Tennessee, named for the company
- Alcoa Power Generating, a subsidiary of Alcoa Inc., in Pittsburgh, Pennsylvania
- Alcoa River
- Alcoa World Alumina and Chemicals
- ALCOA (attributable, legible, contemporaneously recorded, original or a true copy, and accurate); see GxP

== See also ==
- United States v. Alcoa (2d Cir. 1945), a landmark antitrust decision in the United States
- SS Alcoa Puritan (several ships)
