= MV Araraquara =

20th-century Brazilian cargo ship sunk in World War II

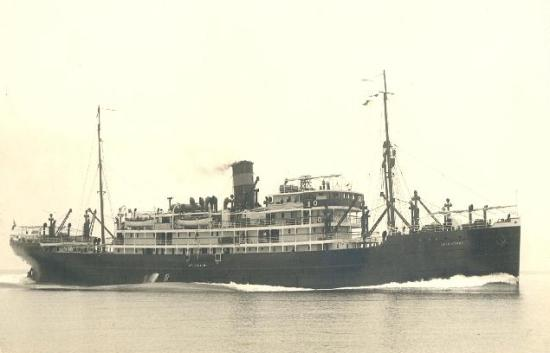
- Araraquara under way

History

Brazil
- Name: Araraquara
- Namesake: Araraquara
- Owner: Lloyd Nacional
- Port of registry: Rio de Janeiro
- Builder: Cantiere Navale Triestino, Monfalcone
- Yard number: 176
- Launched: 1 August 1927
- Completed: October 1927
- Identification: by 1934: call sign PUUC
- Fate: sunk by torpedo, August 1942

General characteristics
- Class & type: Araranguá-class cargo and passenger ship
- Tonnage: 4,872 GRT, 2,974 NRT, 3,800 DWT
- Length: 378.0 ft (115.2 m)
- Beam: 53.7 ft (16.4 m)
- Draught: 18 ft 2 1/4 in (5.54 m)
- Depth: 24.4 ft (7.4 m)
- Decks: 2
- Installed power: 2 × two-stroke diesel engines; 1,008 NHP
- Propulsion: 2 × screws
- Speed: 13 1/2 knots (25 km/h)
- Capacity: cargo: 258,000 cu ft (7,300 m^{3}) grain; 231,000 cu ft (6,500 m^{3}) bale; 16,026 cu ft (453.8 m^{3}) refrigerated
- Crew: 73

Araraquara was a cargo and passenger motor ship. She was built in Italy in 1927 for the Brazilian shipping company Lloyd Nacional. A U-boat sank her in August 1942, killing 131 of the crew and passengers aboard. She was sunk only hours after the same U-boat, U-507, had sunk the Lloyd Brasileiro steamship Baependy, killing 270 people. These and other sinkings by U-507; on the same day and the next few days; were instrumental in Brazil declaring war on Germany and Italy.

== Araranguá-class ships ==
In 1927 and 1928, Cantiere Navale Triestino in Monfalcone, Italy, built a class of four twin-screw motor ships for Lloyd Nacional. (Note: Lloyd Nacional is not to be confused with Lloyd Brasileiro. They were separate companies until September 1942.) The lead ship was Araranguá, which was completed in August 1927. She was followed by Araraquara, completed in October 1927; Araçatuba, completed in January 1928; and Aratimbó, completed in April 1928. At the time, they were the largest ships in the Lloyd Nacional fleet.

On 5 February 1933, while en route from Cabedelo to Porto Alegre, Araçatuba grounded a breakwater at Rio Grande. All aboard were saved, but the ship was wrecked. Lloyd Nacional did not replace her.

== Building and registration ==
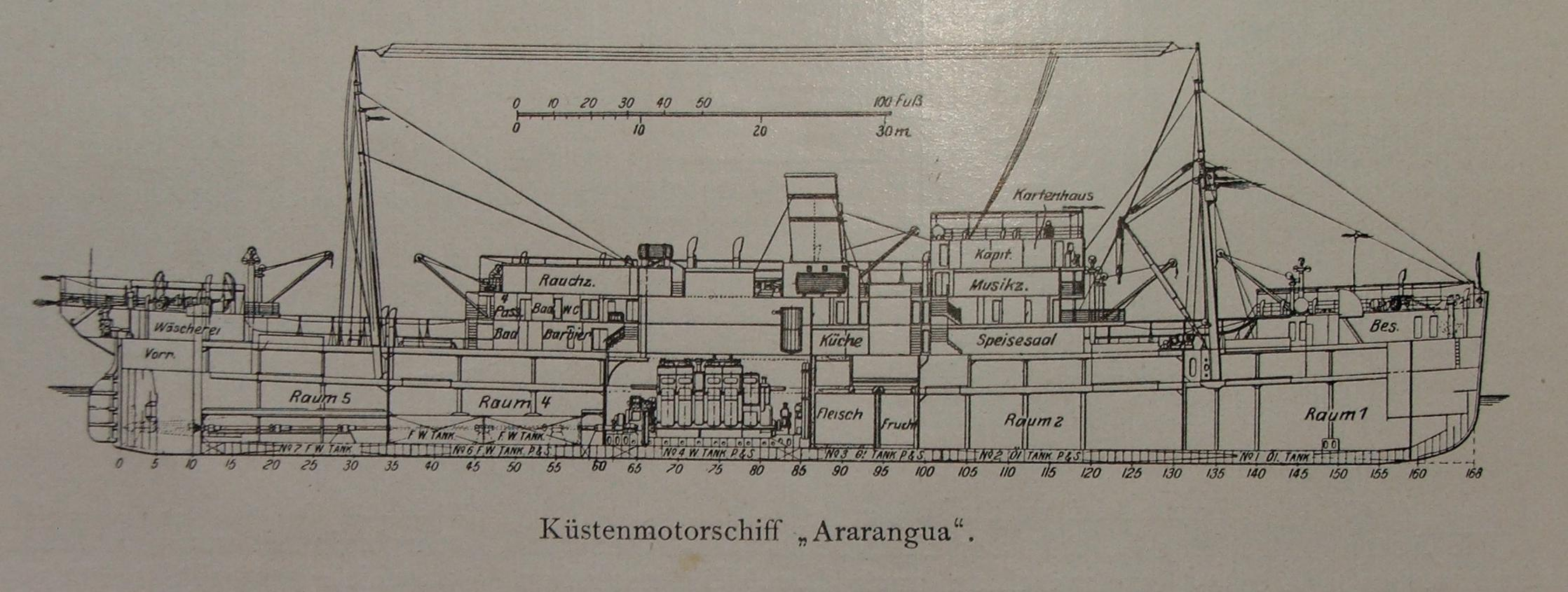
Longitudinal section of Araranguá, lead ship of the Araranguá class

Cantiere Navale Triestino built the ship as yard number 176. She was launched on 1 August 1927 as Araraquara, and completed that October. Her registered length was 378.0 ft (115.2 m); her beam was 53.7 ft (16.4 m); her depth was 24.4 ft (7.4 m); and her draught was 18 ft 2 1/4 in (5.54 m). Her tonnages were 4,872 GRT; 2,974 NRT; and 3,800 DWT. She had four holds: two forward of her superstructure; and two aft. They had a combined capacity for either 258,000 cu ft (7,300 m^{3}) of grain, or 231,000 cu ft (6,500 m^{3}) of cargo in bales. 16,026 cu ft (453.8 m^{3}) of her cargo capacity was refrigerated.

Each of her twin screws was driven by a Fiat four-cylinder, single-acting, two-stroke diesel engine. The combined power of her twin engines was rated at 1,008 NHP, and gave her a speed of 13 1/2 knots (25 km/h).

Lloyd Nacional registered Araraquara in Rio de Janeiro. By 1934 her wireless telegraph call sign was PUUC.

== Context ==
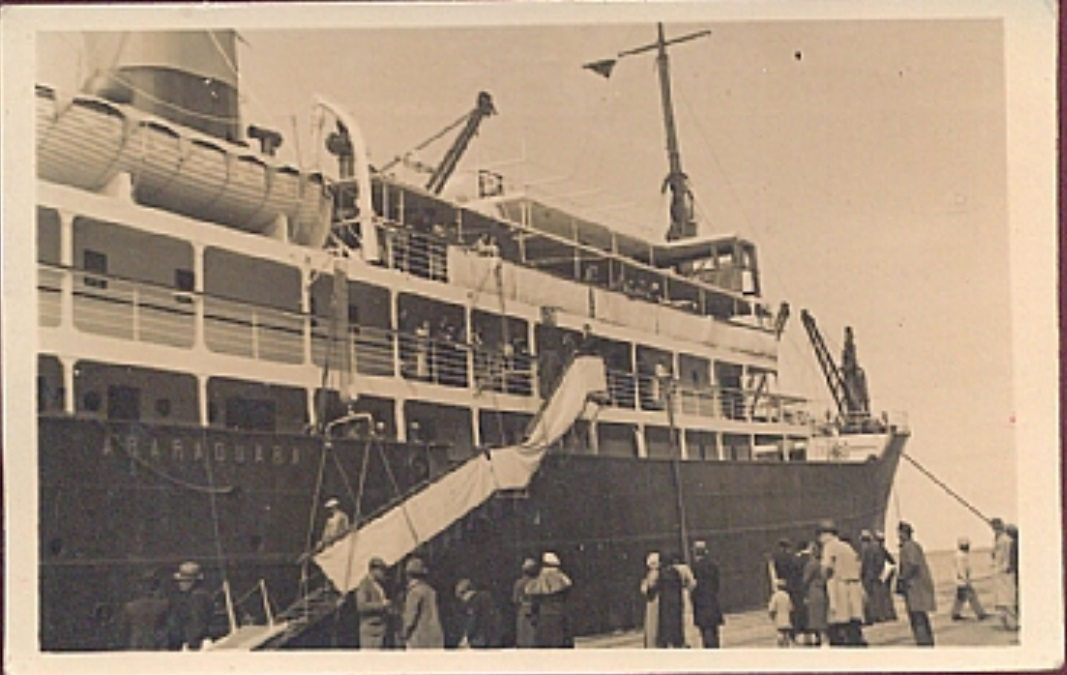
Araraquara embarking passengers

In January 1942, Brazil suspended diplomatic relations with Germany. From that February, German and Italian submarines began to sink Brazilian merchant ships. However, Brazil remained neutral. Early in August, the United States Navy, aided by Brazil, began air patrols from Brazilian bases against Axis submarines, leading to a state of "latent war" between Brazil and the Axis. In response, the German Oberkommando der Marine (OKM) ordered U-507 to the Brazilian coast; there to conduct "free manœuvres"; i.e. sink any Allied or neutral ship, except Argentinian and Chilean ones.

== Loss ==
On 11 August 1942, Araraquara left Rio de Janeiro for Recife. She called at Salvador, where she left on 15 August. Her Master was Captain Augusto Teixeira de Freitas. At 19:12 hrs local time, U-507 sank the Lloyd Brasileiro ship Baependy, about 20 nautical miles (37 km) off the Rio Real lighthouse and Aracaju. She sank too swiftly to transmit a distress signal, so Araraquara remained unaware that a U-boat was nearby.

By 21:00 hrs local time, Araraquara was about 20 nautical miles (37 km) off the mouth of the River Real. Many of her passengers had retired to their cabins. At 21:03 and 21:04 hrs local time; or 02:03 and 02:04 hrs Central European Time, which the Kriegsmarine used; U-507 hit her starboard side with two torpedoes, one minute apart: one in her cargo holds; and the other in her engine room. Her hold caught fire; she listed heavily to starboard; and within five minutes she sank at position 12°00′S 37°19′W. Many of her passengers were trapped in their cabins. Captain de Freitas; seven of his officers; 58 other crew members; and 65 passengers were killed. Only eight members of the crew; two women passengers; and one male passenger survived.

== A survivor's account ==
One of the crew members who survived was First Officer Milton Fernandes da Silva. A month after the attack, he wrote a report describing the incident.

About the torpedoing, he stated:

"At 9:00 p.m., with the ship almost at the portside of the city of Aracaju, and with its glare in sight, I was sleeping in my cabin when I was awakened by a hollow bang, followed by the ship shuddering. I got up immediately, still hearing the noise of the explosion, and tried to turn on the light, but the power was out. I realized that the ship had been torpedoed. I was wearing my uniform trousers over my pyjamas when the Captain came up to me and asked the officer on the watch, Second Officer Benedito Lunes, what had happened. These were his words: "What was it, Benedito?"

The officer, overcome by great nervousness, answered nothing, and I then said: "We were torpedoed". "We were torpedoed, and the ship is sinking considerably." By now the crew was approaching the gangway awaiting the Captain's order, which was as follows: "Put on your life jackets and run to the lifeboats." The Captain's order was immediately executed.

As I passed by the lifeboat number 1, on the way to number 3, of which I was in charge, I saw the Captain, the Chief Engineer, and others who were near the lifeboat's davits already starting the service of lowering the boat.

When I arrived at lifeboat number 3, after about one minute after the first explosion, with the ship already heeling heavily to the starboard side, where the torpedo hit, another explosion was heard, followed by another explosion that set fire to hold number 3, and knocked down part of the boat, with the awning of the boat fell over my lifeboat, making it completely useless. Seeing the impossibility of lowering it, I thought about saving part of the crew, and I went up to the roof of the last awning to look for the rafts, which I couldn't find because they had already fallen into the sea, due to the great inclination of the ship. I went back to the lifeboat, but I couldn't find the crew any more, because, seeing the impossibility of lowering it, they looked for other ways to save themselves. I then ordered the disoriented passengers to go to the other side and try to save themselves as best they could, because the lifeboat would not be lowered.

I crawled out on the deck, followed by several passengers, and carefully went down the awning rails until I reached the side that was already horizontal, with the ship lying completely flat. I ran to the keel, making for the sea, certain that it would be impossible to save myself.

I swam a little, aided by the waves that were quickly pulling me away from the ship. I stopped and was able to witness the same, bury, or rather, dive the stern, standing completely upright and disappearing.

There was no time for any lifeboat to be lowered, every means having been employed to do so."

On the hallucinations of castaways:

"With the vacuum produced by the sinking of the ship, I went down a little, having drunk plenty of oiled water and taken several hits with the wreckage of the ship. When I came back to the surface and was able to breathe, I grabbed onto a floating box, cargo from hold #3. I saw a piece of the awning of the bar and swam to it, where I climbed up and was able to collect 3 more people, being: the Third Enginer, Eralkildes Bruno de Barros, the deck boy, Esmerino Slina Siqueira, and an army officer, a passenger on the ship. (Note: According to Roberto Sander, the names of the castaways were Eroghildes (not Eralkildes) Bueno de Barros, Esmerino Elias (not Slina) Siqueira, and Army Second Lieutenant Oswaldo Costa.)

We were at the mercy of the waves, without finding other people nearby to whom we could turn. So I picked up and placed everything within my reach that I thought might be of some use on the board. That is how I got a small board, a trestle, a sack of flour and a defensive balloon, from which I used the whip of the cable to tie the small board and the trestle to the planks so that the sea would not take them away, because they served as ballast, i.e., they made weight on the board, sinking it, preventing the crest of the waves from bursting them. During the whole dawn we saw constant flashes of explosions at the place where the ship sank, explosions that I believe were in the compressed air bottles and oil tanks. We continued over the canopies, noticing that the sea was bringing us closer and closer to land, always in front of the Aracaju bar.

This is how we spent the rest of the night of the 15th and the whole of the 16th, when, at approximately 2 o'clock on the 17th, the sailor began to show signs of mental disturbance, asking for food, saying he heard the coffee bell ringing, then tried to attack the lieutenant, which we prevented; afterwards, desperate with hunger and thirst, he threw himself into the sea, making it impossible to save him. Soon after, the second lieutenant began to show the same symptom, asking for his colleagues. I remembered then to ask his name, and he answered Oswaldo Costa. I tried to calm him down, it was impossible, he threw himself into the water. Carefully, so that there would be no imbalance on the few planks we had left, I grabbed him by the boots and managed to put him back on them. However, a few minutes later, putting himself in an aggressive attitude, saying that my companion and I were drunk, that he was going home, he went overboard again, and this time, it was impossible to save him."

About the arrival on the beach and the survivors:

"There were now only myself and the third engineer left on the board. So we continued always sighting the flash of the city of Aracaju, where we were being taken.

At daybreak, when we were already sighting the houses of the aforementioned city, the Cotinguiba River ebbing and the strong wind blew us out, causing us to fall into the banks. This just destroyed the boards and threw us into the water. We struggled with this riptide, swimming always in search of the board, because it still offered us resistance, but as we approached it, we were thrown back into the distance, making it impossible to grab it. We continued in this fight until about 9 o'clock, when we saw a crown, and headed for it. I noticed that the tide was rising, and calculating that at high tide, we might not be able to reach the crown, and that we were weak because we hadn't slept or eaten in 36 hours, I convinced my companion that we shouldn't rest, but rather swim to shore, from which we could already see the coconut trees. We stayed only for about 10 minutes, to regain our strength, and then we went out to sea, swimming towards the beach of Estancia, where we arrived at 3:00 pm.

[...] we started walking, and after walking 2½ leagues, we found the Barra farm owned by Manoel Sobral, where the administrator, Mr. Luiz Gonzaga de Oliveira, prepared dinner and offered it to us. After the meal, the administrator sent two of his employees in a canoe to take us to the city of São Cristóvão.

During the trip, we were able to sleep a little in the back of the boat. At 21 hours we arrived in the city, and we were received by the people, and then the mayor presented himself, who led us to his residence, forcing us to take a small meal, while we waited for the driver to continue the journey to Aracaju. I then asked them to telegraph my family that I was safe.

As we were finishing our meal, another survivor of the Araraquara appeared; it was the passenger Caetano Moreira Falcão, who had washed ashore on one of the rafts and was picked up by a fisherman. On that raft, there were two other passengers, who died fighting the surf. Mr. Mayor took us in his car to Aracaju, where we arrived at midnight, taking us to the State Governor, with whom we talked for a few moments. After leaving the life jacket and lifebuoy we had brought with us in the palace, we retired to the Hotel Marozzi, where we stayed.

The next day, we were rescued and treated by Dr. Moysés, a doctor at the assistance station.

I was unable to move around for 10 days, by doctor's order, and during this period, other castaways were arriving in Aracaju; I was informed of this by the agent, Dr. Carlos Cruz, who I asked to telegraph the company, informing them of everything, as well as the families who telegraphed me asking for news of their loved ones."

About the other survivors:

"The other survivors were the following: José Pedro da Costa, barber, who saved himself on a piece of the board; Francisco José dos Santos, sailor, and Mauricio Ferreira Vital, steward, who saved themselves on one of the rafts, bringing with them the passenger, Mrs. Eunice Balman; José Rufino dos Santos, sailor, José Correia dos Santos, young man, and José Alves de Mola, a charcoal collector, who came ashore on the keel of the lifeboat no. 4, which floated down after the ship was submerged, with the passenger, Mrs. Alaíde Cavalcante, in tow.

Several corpses washed up on the beach, being photographed by the police, and, among them, I could identify two: the steward, Celso Rosas, and the Caldeirinha corporal, Pedro Vieira. Lifeboats number 1 and 2 also washed ashore but were empty. On the 29th, we went by order of the Company to Bahia, where we stayed aboard the ship Itaquera, from where we left on 4 September, traveling by land to Rio de Janeiro, where we arrived at 11 pm on the 10th.

It was reported in the city of Salvador that the crew of the yacht and the barge that was boarded, the latter being bombed, identified the U-boat crew as being of German nationality, thus proving and recognizing the cowards who torpedoed five completely defenseless passenger ships within 48 hours."

== Reaction ==
On 18 August, the Brazilian Government Departamento de Imprensa e Propaganda ("Department of Press and Propaganda") released the news that Baependy and Araraquara had been torpedoed. By then, four other ships had been sunk. The communiqué read:

For the first time, Brazilian vessels, serving the traffic of our coasts in the transport of passengers and cargo from one state to another, suffered attacks by Axis submarines (...) The unspeakable attack against defenseless units of the merchant navy of a peaceful country, whose life takes place on the margins and far from the theater of war, was practiced with ignorance of the most elementary principles of law and humanity. Our country, in keeping with its tradition, is not afraid of such brutality and the government is examining what measures to take in the face of what has happened. The people must remain calm and confident, in the certainty that the crimes committed against the lives and property of Brazilians will not go unpunished." Departamento de Imprensa e Propaganda, 18 August 1942.

The news outraged Brazilians, who turned against German, Italian and Japanese immigrants and their descendants. In many Brazilian cities, commercial establishments belonging to people from those countries were looted; and lynchings were attempted; even against those who did not support the Nazi cause. There were anti-fascist demonstrations in the country.

Foreign Minister Oswaldo Aranha

Students, trade unionists, workers and other sectors of society marched through the country's main cities, demanding that Brazil declare war. In Rio de Janeiro, there were protests around the Guanabara Palace and Itamaraty Palace. A large rally in the center of Rio de Janeiro, led by Foreign Minister Oswaldo Aranha, roused the population, who marched to the Guanabara Palace and demanded that President Getúlio Vargas declare war on the Axis countries. On 22 August, after a ministerial meeting, Vargas declared a "state of belligerence" against Germany and Italy, (Note: Brazil did not declare war on Japan, as it believed that Japan had not sunk any Brazilian ships.) formalized by Decree-Law No. 10,508, issued on 31 August 1942.

== Bibliography ==
- Lloyd's Register of Shipping. Vol. II.–Steamers and Motorships. London: Lloyd's Register of Shipping. 1928 – via Internet Archive.
- Lloyd's Register of Shipping. Vol. I.–Sailing Vessels. London: Lloyd's Register of Shipping. 1929 – via Internet Archive.
- Lloyd's Register of Shipping. Vol. I.–Sailing Vessels. London: Lloyd's Register of Shipping. 1934 – via Internet Archive.
- Lloyd's Register of Shipping. Vol. II.–Steamers and Motorships of 300 tons gross and over. London: Lloyd's Register of Shipping. 1934 – via Southampton City Council.
- Sander, Roberto (2007). O Brasil na mira de Hitler: a história do afundamento de navios brasileiros pelos nazistas (in Portuguese). Rio de Janeiro: Objetiva. ISBN 978-85-7302-868-3.
- Scheina, Robert L (2004). Latin America's Wars Volume II: The Age of the Professional Soldier, 1900–2001. Lincoln, NE: Potomac Books. ISBN 978-1574884524.
