= SS Alcoa Puritan =

SS Alcoa Puritan may refer to:

- SS Alcoa Puritan (1941), a Type C1-B ship launched in 1941; sunk in May 1942 by U-507
- SS Alcoa Puritan (1943), a Type C1-B ship launched in 1943; scrapped in 1965
