= SS Baependy =

German-built passenger steamship, torpedoed in 1942

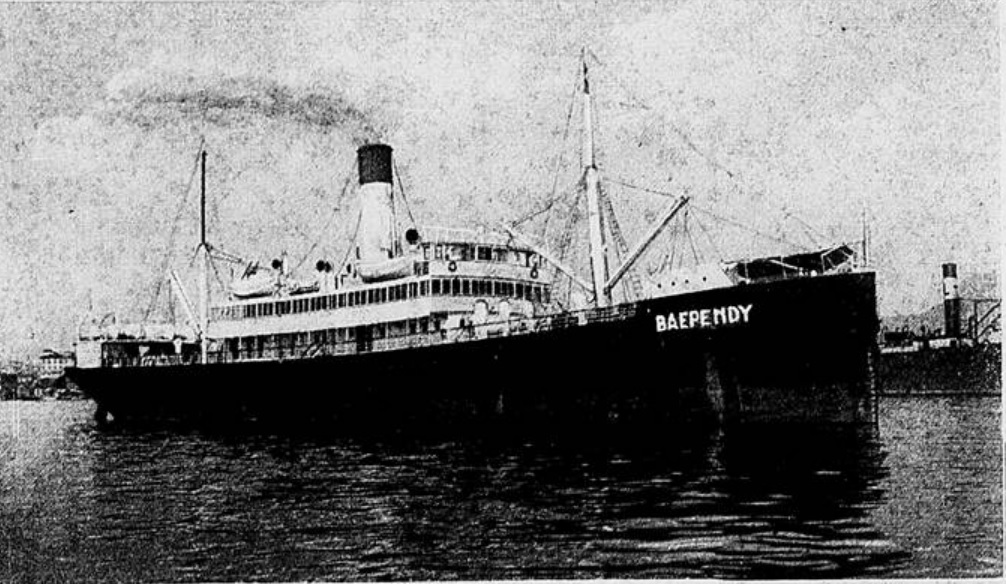
- The ship as Baependy, in 1930

History
- Name: 1899: Tijuca; 1917: Baependy
- Namesake: 1899: Tijuca; 1917: Baependi
- Owner: 1899: Hamburg Süd; 1917: Government of Brazil; 1927: Lloyd Brasileiro
- Operator: 1920: Government of France; 1923: Lloyd Brasileiro
- Port of registry: 1899: (German Empire) Hamburg; by 1919: (Brazil) Rio de Janeiro
- Route: 1899: Hamburg – east coast of South America
- Builder: Blohm+Voss, Hamburg
- Yard number: 135
- Launched: 5 July 1899
- Completed: 5 August 1899
- Maiden voyage: 5 August 1899
- Identification: 1899: code letters RLJQ; by 1918: call sign DUC; by 1934: call sign PUAJ
- Fate: sunk by torpedo, August 1942

General characteristics
- Class & type: Asuncion-class Kombischiff
- Tonnage: 4,801 GRT, 3,066 NRT, 6,400 DWT
- Length: 375.6 ft (114.5 m)
- Beam: 46.3 ft (14.1 m)
- Depth: 27.5 ft (8.4 m)
- Decks: 2
- Installed power: 1 × quadruple-expansion engine: 315 NHP; 2,000 ihp
- Propulsion: 1 × screw
- Speed: 11 1/2 knots (21 km/h)
- Crew: 1899: 60; 1943: 73
- Armament: after March 1942: 1 × 4.7-inch (120 mm) naval gun

Baependy was a merchant steamship, which was in Brazilian ownership when a U-boat sank her in 1942. Her sinking killed 270 people; including numerous women and children; and was instrumental in Brazil declaring war on Germany and Italy. Her sinking has the biggest death toll of any Brazilian ship sunk by an act of war, and the fourth deadliest in history involving a Brazilian ship.

The ship was built in Germany in 1899 as the mail steamer Tijuca for Hamburg Südamerikanische DG. She was what in German is called a "kombischiff": a term roughly equivalent to "cargo liner" in English. She was the last of 11 Asuncion-class ships to be built for Hamburg Süd.

For nearly 15 years, Tijuca carried emigrants and cargo on a regular route between Hamburg and the east coast of South America. At the beginning of the First World War, she took refuge in a port in neutral Brazil. In 1917, after Germany started sinking Brazilian merchant ships, the Brazilian government seized her and renamed her Baependy. Lloyd Brasileiro was managing her by 1923, and owned her by 1927.

In August 1942 a German U-boat sank Baependy, killing 270 people. Only 36 people survived. German and Italian submarines had been sinking Brazilian-owned ships since that February, and some of those sinkings had killed crew members. However, the sinking of Baependy killed twice as many people as all previous attacks, and they included numerous women and children. This was compounded by the same U-boat, U-507, sinking another four Brazilian ships in the 48 hours after she sank Baependy. Brazilians were outraged. After resulting public protests, and some civil disorder, Brazil declared war on Germany and Italy a week later.

== Names and namesakes ==
This was the second of three Hamburg Süd ships to be named after Tijuca, a suburb of Rio de Janeiro. The first was a passenger and cargo steamship that was built for Hamburg Süd in 1886; sold to Hamburg America Line (HAPAG) in 1896; and renamed Valdivia. After further changes of owner and name, she was scrapped in 1927. The third was a cargo steamship that was built in 1923 as Ludwigshafen for Norddeutscher Lloyd (NDL). Hamburg Süd chartered her from 1935, and bought and renamed her in 1938. She was surrendered to the United Kingdom in 1945; sold to Danish owners in 1946; renamed Marie Skou; and after a further change of owners and name; she was scrapped in 1959.

Tijuca was renamed after the town of Baependi in Minas Gerais. However, the ship's name was registered as Baependy, with a "Y" at the end, and correctly is always spelt that way.

== Building and registration ==
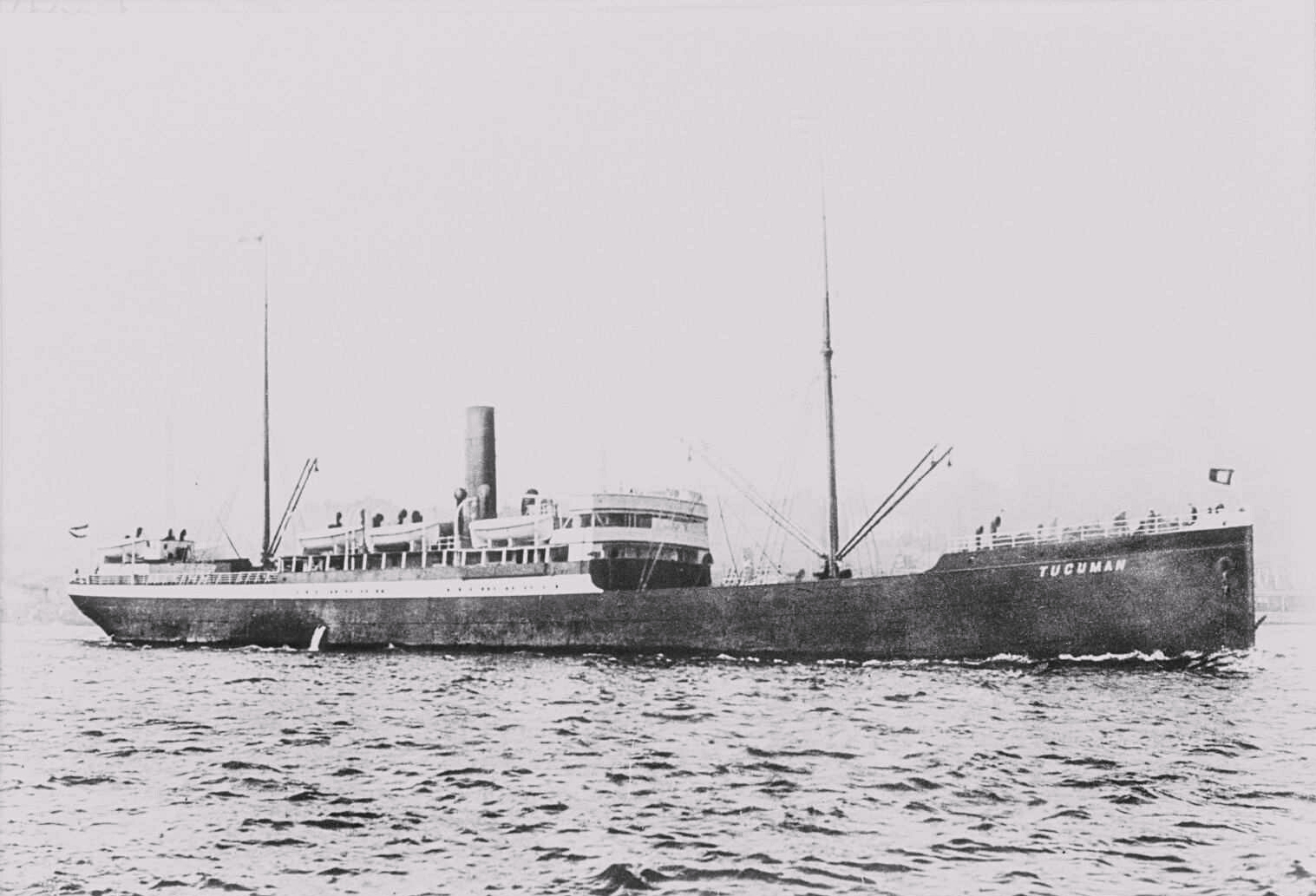
Tucuman; one of Tijuca's sister ships; built in 1895

Blohm+Voss built the ship as yard number 135. She was launched as Tijuca on 5 July 1899, and completed on 5 August. Her registered length was 375.6 ft (114.5 m); her beam was 46.3 ft (14.1 m); and her depth was 27.5 ft (8.4 m). Her tonnages were 4,801 GRT; 3,066 NRT; and 6,400 DWT. Blohm+Voss built Tijuca's quadruple-expansion engine. It was rated at 315 NHP or 2,000 ihp, and gave her a speed of 11 1/2 knots (21 km/h).

Hamburg Süd registered Tijuca in Hamburg. Her code letters were RLJQ. On 23 August she left Hamburg on her maiden voyage, which was to Santos in Brazil. By 1914 she was equipped with wireless telegraphy. By 1918 her call sign was DUC, but by that time Brazil had seized her.

== Tijuca ==
Tijuca joined her Asuncion-class sister ships on Hamburg Süd's "Gold Route" from Hamburg to Brazil, and sometimes worked the company's "Silver Route" to the Río de la Plata ports of Argentina and Uruguay.

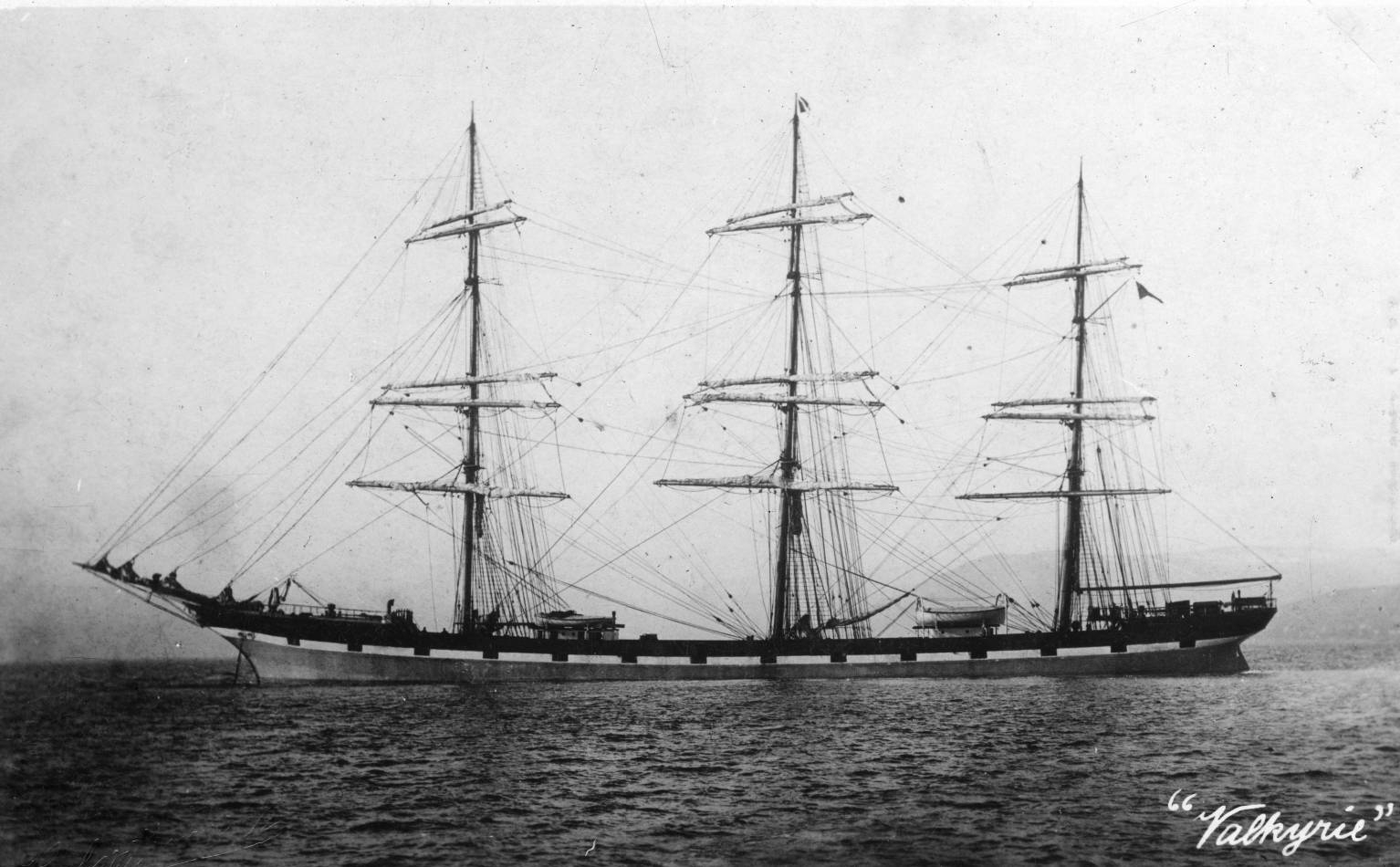
Valkyrie

On 9 November 1901, Tijuca collided with the 2,270 GRT UK sailing ship Valkyrie off Brockdorf on the River Elbe, sinking her.

On 3 August 1914, Germany declared war on France and Russia. The next day, the United Kingdom declared war on Germany, and Tijuca took refuge in Recife to avoid Entente naval patrols.

== Baependy ==
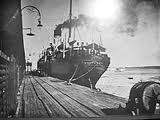
Baependy in port

In February 1917, Germany resumed unrestricted submarine warfare. That April and May, German U-boats sank three Brazilian steamships. On 9 April, Brazil terminated diplomatic relations with Germany; placed armed guards on German ships in Brazilian ports; and removed "essential machinery". On 2 June, Brazil seized 46 German merchant ships that were sheltering in Brazilian ports. They included four Asuncion-class ships: Asuncion in Belém; and San Nicolas; Santos and Tijuca in Pernambuco.

Tijuca was renamed Baependy. By 1919 she was registered in Rio de Janeiro. The Government of France chartered her in 1920, and returned her in 1922. Lloyd Brasileiro was managing her by 1923, and owned her by 1927. The company operated her both on cabotage routes along the Brazilian coast, and on international routes. By 1934, her call sign was PUAJ, and this had superseded her code letters.

== Axis attacks on Brazilian merchant shipping ==
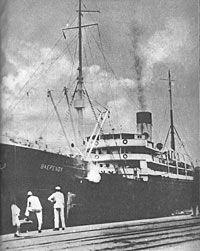
Baependy in port

In the early part of the Second World War, Brazil was again neutral. However, from January 1942, it seemed certain that Brazil would align itself with the United States in the war against Germany. The German ambassador made clear to Foreign Minister Oswaldo Aranha what would happen if Brazil broke off relations with the Axis powers: "...it would undoubtedly mean a state of latent war, probably leading to events that would be tantamount to the outbreak of actual war".

That February, German U-boats began to sink Brazilian merchant ships. The Brazilian government, along with the United States Navy, began to apply defensive measures to Brazilian ships. They were painted grey, and voyaged blacked out, and without flags. In the middle of that year, they began to be defensively armed with one 4.7-inch (120 mm) naval gun. This was standard primary armament for Allied merchant ships in both World Wars. It could repel an enemy submarine in daylight; and particularly if the submarine's first attempt to torpedo the ship missed its target. However, it was no defence against surprise attacks; and especially at night; such as were made against Brazilian merchant ships in the Caribbean in June and July 1942.

On 24 May, the commander of the U-502 announced that he had sunk an armed Brazilian merchant ship, the Gonçalves Dias, in the Caribbean. On 27 May the Brazilian Minister of Aeronautics, Salgado Filho announced with euphoria that his planes had attacked Axis submarines without declaring war. The Kriegsmarine responded by asking for all restrictions on attacks on Brazilian ships to be lifted.

Also in May, a Brazilian Air Force (FAB) plane took off from Natal Air Base to "[locate] and [attack] a hostile submarine" which had attacked the cargo ship Comandante Lira. The hunt was unsuccessful, but the Brazilian Government; newspapers; the public; and even US President Roosevelt welcomed the FAB's attempted retaliation. The Kriegsmarine began surprise attacks. The Oberkommando der Marine (OKM) asked Hitler to lift the restrictions on attacking Brazilian ships, which he immediately did.

In theory, the treatment given to ships from non-belligerent countries, until then, was interception; inspection; interrogation of the crew; and, finally, the order to abandon, so that the ship could be sunk after the crew was safely away in her lifeboats. Therefore, "lifting the restrictions" meant sinking a ship without warning; which greatly increased the danger to her crew and any passengers. From then on, Brazilian ships were considered belligerent, and were to be torpedoed without warning.

== Hitler's orders ==
Dissatisfied with the fact that he had not succeeded in bending Brazil as he had intended, Hitler, on 4 July, approved an OKM plan to penetrate the ports of Recife; Rio de Janeiro; Salvador; and Santos by stealth at night. Anchored installations and ships would be torpedoed, and harbour mouths mined, which would increase the Brazil's already serious supply problems. However, Hitler abandoned the plan, after Foreign Minister Joachim von Ribbentrop warned that it could draw the entire American continent into the war, including neutral Argentina and Chile.

At the beginning of August, the OKM gave new orders: only U-507 was to infiltrate Brazilian territorial waters. There, she was to conduct "free manœuvres"; i.e. sink any Allied or neutral ship, except Argentinian and Chilean ones. Brazil was still neutral, but Germany considered Brazil's neutrality to be compromised, and therefore U-507's actions to be legitimate.

== Loss ==
At 07:00 hrs local time on 15 August 1942, Baependy left Salvador for Maceió. Her Master was Captain João Soares Da Silva. Her complement comprised 72 other officers and ratings. She carried 233 passengers, many of whom were members of the 7th Artillery Regiment of the Brazilian Army.

Just after 19:00 hrs local time, Baependy was about 20 nautical miles (37 km) off the Rio Real lighthouse and Aracaju, and making about 9 knots (17 km/h). Her passengers had just finished dinner, and an orchestra was playing to celebrate her Chief Officer's birthday. At 19:12 hrs local time; (or 00:12 hrs Central European Time, which the Kriegsmarine used); U-507 hit her starboard side with two torpedoes. The first hit her stokehold, and the second hit her bunkers. One of the explosions blew the hatch off her Number 2 hold, forward of her bridge. Flames rose from the hold, almost as high as her mast-head. The ship caught fire, and rapidly listed to starboard. She sank between two and five minutes after being hit, (Note: Sander says two minutes; Helgason says five.) at position 11°50′S 37°00′W. The wireless telegraph officer had no time to transmit a distress signal, and the crew had no time to launch the lifeboats. According to survivors, Captain Da Silva was on the bridge, where he sounded the ship's steam whistle as a distress signal.

215 passengers; Captain Da Silva; and 54 crew were killed. Many of the passengers were trapped in their quarters. Victims included Major Landerico de Albuquerque Lima of the 7th Artillery Regiment; eight other artillery officers; and 133 artillerymen. All of the child passengers were killed; as were all but one of the women. One lifeboat floated free, and 29 people climbed into it. Another seven people survived by clinging to floating wreckage. Light buoys, which lit up on contact with the water, gave the sea a reddish hue. One survivor reported that U-507 surfaced and played its searchlight across the wreckage, before leaving the scene.

== A survivor's account ==
One artillery officer; Captain Lauro Moutinho dos Reis, wrote a description of the sinking. It was published in 1948; in the book Seleções de Seleções; which was a collection of articles published in the magazine Seleções do Reader's Digest.

Late at night, all the lights off, we were sailing about 20 miles from the coast, when suddenly a tremendous bang violently shook the old boat. The windows shattered, the woodwork creaked, cracked and, thrown by invisible forces, shards of glass and wood flew everywhere. The first victims fall, and there are several people whose faces are bleeding from wounds caused by shards of glass.

The machines stop, the steam abruptly changes course, and we are thrown forward by inertia. The first instant leaves everyone motionless with astonishment, their breaths suspended, their faces pale and anguished... There are no screams, no panic. Everyone is struggling to understand what has happened, to find a solution, sensing the gravity of the terrible moment...

I'm in the vestibule, from where the stairs lead to the upper deck and the cabins below. Taken by surprise, I have an immediate intuition: we've been torpedoed! Immediately afterwards, I hear the ship's deaf whistle calling for help... The Baependi begins to heel over.

I run to my cabin nearby, push open the door, which fortunately hasn't jammed, quickly grab my life preserver and get out. There are many people in the hallway; some, mainly women and children, are standing still, as if waiting for someone else to save them; others are walking feverishly in the direction where they think they can find rescue. The ship is getting worse and worse; all we can do now is cling to the walls.

Some are struggling down the stairs to the lower cabins in search of lifeboats, or to rejoin their families; unfortunately, they are never to return... They will be left in the company of those who haven't even managed to get out.

I see all this at a glance and, still wearing my lifebelt, I climb the ladder to the top deck in search of my lifeboat; clinging to the railing, bumping into people who are coming down, stunned, I'm almost at the top when a second torpedo explodes, shattering the whole ship. The railing I was clinging to is torn to shreds, and I roll down the stairs, backwards, tumbling to the door of the mess hall, from which I had come out. No more than thirty seconds elapsed between the first and second torpedoes.

The lights go out; we bump into each other, disoriented, in deep darkness. The ship is heaving considerably, and it is now impossible to walk upright. The second torpedo was the coup de grace. The Baependi is in agony... I realize that she's going to sink quickly. I struggle to get out of the interior. A suffocating, nauseating smell from the explosion invades everything.

Groping, with great effort, I manage to hold on to the ladder and, holding on to the ledges, I slowly make my way up. In the darkness, I can just make out the outline of a door at the end of the staircase I'm trying to climb. I have to reach it at all costs, otherwise I'll sink inside the ship. One more effort and I make it.

The ship is now almost on its side: what used to be a wall has become a floor. I go through that door with the movements of someone who, through the opening in the ceiling, passes into the ceiling of a house.

== Survival ==
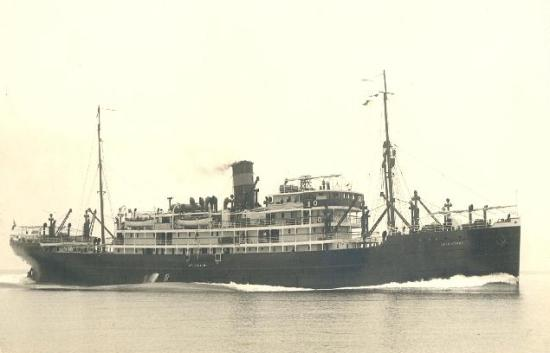
Araraquara under way

The night was overcast; and the sea rough; and the weather cold. All of the survivors in the lifeboat were soaked from being in the sea; and some were injured. One wave nearly capsized the boat. The boat's hull was damaged, and the men stripped off to use their clothes to plug the leak. The boat was still shipping water, so they used a bucket to bale it. In the night, they saw the lights of a ship in the distance, but it was too far for them to reach it. About an hour later, they heard a rumble and saw a huge flash. They did not know it, but it was another Brazilian ship, Araraquara, being torpedoed by U-507.

At dawn the next day, the lifeboat reached a deserted beach on the south coast of Sergipe, where survivors found water in an abandoned hut by the beach. After a long walk, they reached the village of Canoas. After being fed, they went to Estância, where they learned that another eight survivors had washed ashore by clinging to wreckage. The eight included Baependy's Chief Engineer, Adolfo Artur Kern. He said that he spent around half an hour floating in the rough sea, among other survivors, and flames from oil spilled from the ship. A total of 36 people survived: 18 passengers and 18 crew.

== Reaction ==
On 18 August, the Brazilian Government Departamento de Imprensa e Propaganda ("Department of Press and Propaganda") released the news that Baependy had been torpedoed. By then, five other ships had been sunk. The communiqué read:

For the first time, Brazilian vessels, serving the traffic of our coasts in the transport of passengers and cargo from one state to another, suffered attacks by Axis submarines (...) The unspeakable attack against defenseless units of the merchant navy of a peaceful country, whose life takes place on the margins and far from the theater of war, was practiced with ignorance of the most elementary principles of law and humanity. Our country, in keeping with its tradition, is not afraid of such brutality and the government is examining what measures to take in the face of what has happened. The people must remain calm and confident, in the certainty that the crimes committed against the lives and property of Brazilians will not go unpunished." Departamento de Imprensa e Propaganda, 18 August 1942.

Exactly twice as many people were killed in the attack as in the previous 14 sinkings between January and July of that year. Some described U-507's attack on Brazilian shipping as the "Brazilian Pearl Harbor".

The news outraged Brazilians, who turned against German, Italian and Japanese immigrants and their descendants. In many Brazilian cities, commercial establishments belonging to people from those countries were looted; and lynchings were attempted; even against those who did not support the Nazi cause. There were anti-fascist demonstrations in the country.

Foreign Minister Oswaldo Aranha

Students, trade unionists, workers and other sectors of society marched through the country's main cities, demanding that Brazil declare war. In Rio de Janeiro, there were protests around the Guanabara Palace and Itamaraty Palace. A large rally in the center of Rio de Janeiro, led by Foreign Minister Aranha, roused the population, who marched to the Guanabara Palace and demanded that President Getúlio Vargas declare war on the Axis countries. On 22 August, after a ministerial meeting, Vargas declared a "state of belligerence" against Germany and Italy, (Note: Brazil did not declare war on Japan, as it believed that Japan had not sunk any Brazilian ships.) formalized by Decree-Law No. 10,508, issued on 31 August 1942.

The sinking of Baependy still has the biggest death toll of any Brazilian ship sunk by an act of war, and the fourth deadliest in history involving a Brazilian ship. (Note: In terms of deaths, the attack on the Baependi is surpassed only by the ships Sobral Santos and Novo Amapá, both sunk in the Amazon in 1981, with death tolls of 348 and 282, respectively; and by the explosion of the cruiser Bahia in 1945, with 340 deaths.) With its impact it had on modern Brazilian history, it is a recurring subject of maritime literature, and the subject of various academic and military studies.

== Bibliography ==
- Cooper, James; Kludas, Arnold; Pein, Joachim (1989). The Hamburg South America Line. Kendal: World Ship Society. ISBN 0-905617-50-9.
- Lloyd's Register of British and Foreign Shipping. Vol. I.–Steamers. London: Lloyd's Register of Shipping. 1901 – via Internet Archive.
- Lloyd's Register of Shipping. Vol. I.–Steamers. London: Lloyd's Register of Shipping. 1914 – via Internet Archive.
- Lloyd's Register of Shipping. Vol. II.–Steamers. London: Lloyd's Register of Shipping. 1917 – via Internet Archive.
- Lloyd's Register of Shipping. Vol. II.–Steamers. London: Lloyd's Register of Shipping. 1919 – via Internet Archive.
- Lloyd's Register of Shipping. Vol. II.–Steamers. London: Lloyd's Register of Shipping. 1921 – via Internet Archive.
- Lloyd's Register of Shipping. Vol. II.–Steamers and Motor Vessels. London: Lloyd's Register of Shipping. 1923 – via Internet Archive.
- Lloyd's Register of Shipping. Vol. II.–Steamers and Motorships. London: Lloyd's Register of Shipping. 1927 – via Internet Archive.
- Lloyd's Register of Shipping (PDF). Vol. II.–Steamers and Motorships of 300 tons gross and over. London: Lloyd's Register of Shipping. 1934 – via Southampton City Council.
- The Marconi Press Agency Ltd (1918). The Year Book of Wireless Telegraphy and Telephony. London: The Wireless Press, Ltd.
- Sander, Roberto (2007). O Brasil na mira de Hitler: a história do afundamento de navios brasileiros pelos nazistas (in Portuguese). Rio de Janeiro: Objetiva. ISBN 978-85-7302-868-3.
