= Lloyd Brasileiro =

Brazilian shipping company

Companhia de Navegação Lloyd Brasileiro
- Type: State-owned
- Founded: February 19, 1894; 132 years ago
- Founder: Arthur Silveira da Motta
- Defunct: March 3, 1998; 28 years ago
- Fate: Dissolved
- Headquarters: Rio de Janeiro, Brazil
- Area served: Worldwide
- Key people: Américo Silveira (Chairman)
- Services: Container shipping Freight distribution Supply chain management

Companhia de Navegação Lloyd Brasileiro (English: Navigation Company Lloyd Brasileiro), usually just called Lloyd Brasileiro, Lóide or Lloydbrás, was a Brazilian shipping company founded on 19 February 1894. It became the only major shipping company in South America, in particular by taking over German ships confiscated in 1917 by Brazil's entry into the First World War. In 1931, Lloyd Brasileiro was among the 50 largest shipping companies in the world, owning 73 ships of 271,000 GRT combined.

The company was dissolved in October 1997 during the government of president Fernando Henrique Cardoso.

== History ==
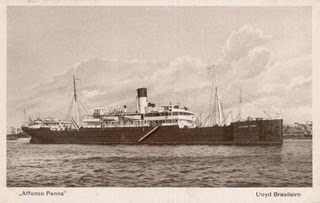
Minas Gerais in the 1920s as Affonso Penna

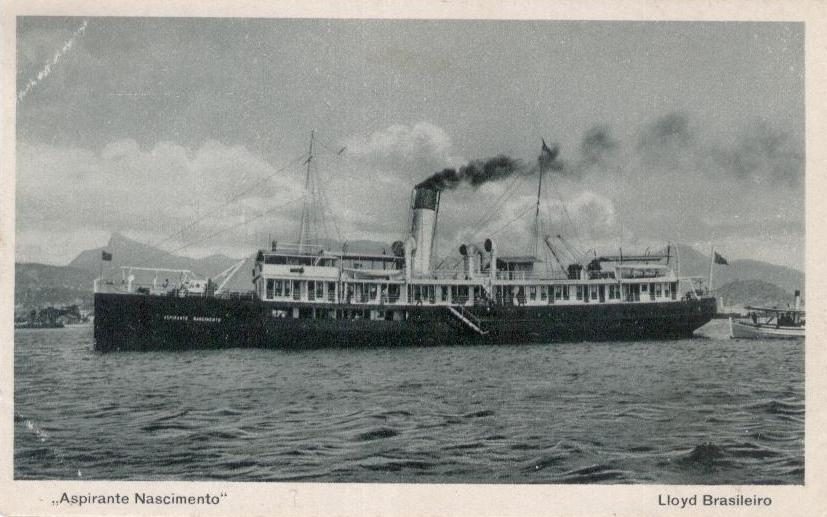
Aspirante Nascimento, formerly Venus of Hapag/Cruzeiro do Sul

With the independence of Brazil, the naval sector gradually restructured itself to cope with the growing demand for means of locomotion of cargo and passengers by river and sea. Brazilian admiral Artur Silveira da Mota (1843–1914) attempted to establish a Brazilian overseas shipping company beginning in 1886. This was to operate two steamship lines to Europe (northern Europe to Hamburg and to the Mediterranean) and actively seek to support desirable immigration to Brazil. The ensuing unrest delayed the implementation of this plan. The company was founded in February 1894 with the federal government of Brazil as the main owner, and to this end the existing shipping companies Empreza Transatlântica Brasileira, Companhia Brasileira de Navegação a Vapor and the Companhia Nacional de Navegação a Vapor merged with the smaller shipping companies Companhia Progresso Marítimo, Companhia de Navegação da Estrada de Ferro Espírito Santo a Caravelas, to which were added in 1891 the three smaller shipping companies Companhia Bahiana de Navegação, Companhia Paraense de Navegação and the Companhia Brasileira de Estradas de Ferro e Navegação.

In fact, the main business was Brazilian coastal traffic, including traffic in the Amazon basin. However, commercial success failed to materialize. In 1906, a plan emerged to order 18 new ships built in Britain and to purchase a number of used ships. The implementation of this plan and the establishment of lines to New York and, in 1910, to Portugal and then to Great Britain and Germany did not bring the economic profits and led to the complete takeover of the company by the state before World War I.

The company's largest ships in 1914 were the British-built Ceará (1907, 3324 GRT), Pará (1907, 3351 GRT), São Paulo (1907, 3583 GRT), Rio de Janeiro (1908, 3583 GRT), Bahia (1910, 3401 GRT), and Minas Gerais (1910, 3540 GRT), small passenger steamers with refrigerated holds for transporting agricultural goods on outbound voyages to Europe or the United States. The newbuildings were joined in 1911 by the freighters Purus (1900, 3822 GRT), Tocantins (1901, 3837 GRT) and Tapajós (1902, 3774 GRT), acquired from the British-Brazilian Buarque Line.

In addition to these nine ships over 3,000 GRT, there were four steamers over 2,000 GRT and 22 steamers of over 1,000 GRT. Among these were the steamers built for the Cia. de Nav. Cruzeiro do Sul, Santos. Hamburg Süd and Hapag had founded this company in 1905 for the coastal service between Rio de Janeiro and Buenos Aires and had five ships (Saturno, Orion, Jupiter and Sirio of 1,800 to 1,900 GRT and for the Rio Grande do Sul–Porto Alegre service Venus of 966 GRT) built in Germany. These ships all entered the service of Lloyd Brasileiro between 1908 and 1916 after the German holdings were abandoned.

=== World War I ===
The outbreak of World War I forced the company to shorten its European line and then take it into the Mediterranean. This change was also abandoned after Italy entered the war, especially as the Central Powers stepped up their submarine warfare.

Brazil initially tacitly tolerated the use of some uninhabited islands off its coast by the belligerent powers. British warships also entered Brazilian ports relatively frequently. The Germans supplied their merchant ships, especially their light cruisers SMS Dresden and SMS Karlsruhe. The landing of more than 400 prisoners from Karlsruhe by a steamer of the Hamburg Süd in Belém in the fall of 1914 led to the indication to the Germans that further support of their naval war would not be tolerated. The more than 40 German merchant ships in Brazilian ports did not subsequently conduct any support operations, especially since German warships did not operate off the Brazilian coast after the loss of Karlsruhe and the East Asia Squadron until 1916. On 22 May 1917, the old steamer Lapa (former Sparta, 1,366 GRT, 1872) of Lloyd Brasileiro, with a cargo of coffee bound for Marseille, was stopped off Gibraltar by the German SM U-47 and became the fourth Brazilian ship to be sunk.

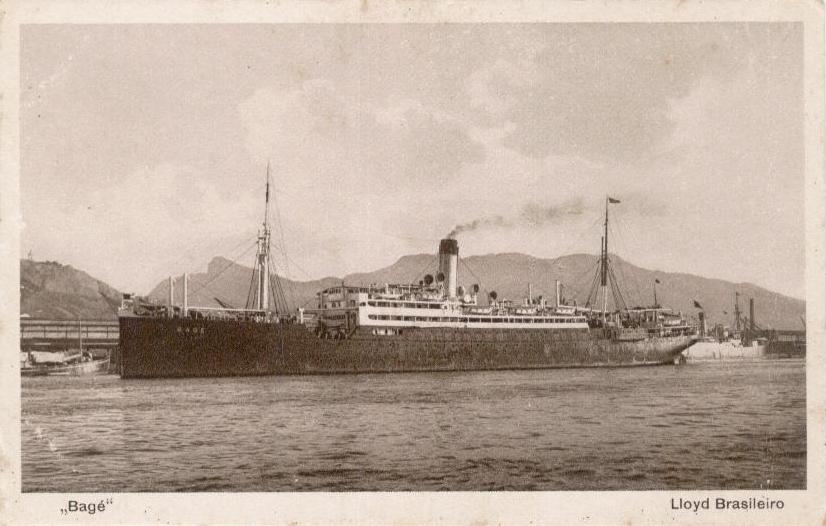
Bagé (former Sierra Nevada), Avare's sister ship

When Brazil joined the war on the side of the Triple Entente in 1917, the 45 ships of the Central Powers were seized in Brazilian ports and used as merchant ships by Lloyd Brasileiro. Thus, the largest ship of the Brazilian merchant navy and shipping company became the Hapag steamer Blücher of 12,334 GRT renamed as Leopoldina, which, however, was placed at the disposal of France in 1918 and from 1921 was used by the Compagnie Générale Transatlantique in service to the United States. In March 1923, the ship was sold to CGT and renamed Suffren. In the service of the shipping company as the largest ship remained Bahia Laura of Hamburg-Süd as Caxias, then Ruy Barbosa, of 9,790 GRT.

Operated by Lloyd Brasileiro, three steamers were lost to German U-boats during the First World War. They were:

- Macao, former Palatia of Hapa; 3,558 BRT, built 1912, whose sinking on 18 October 1917 finally triggered a state of war.
- Acary, former Ebernburg of DDG Hansa; 4,275 BRT, built 1905, sunk on 3 November 1917.
- Maceió, former Santa Anna of HSDG; 3.739 BRT, Bj. 1910, sunk on 2 August 1918.

=== Interwar period ===
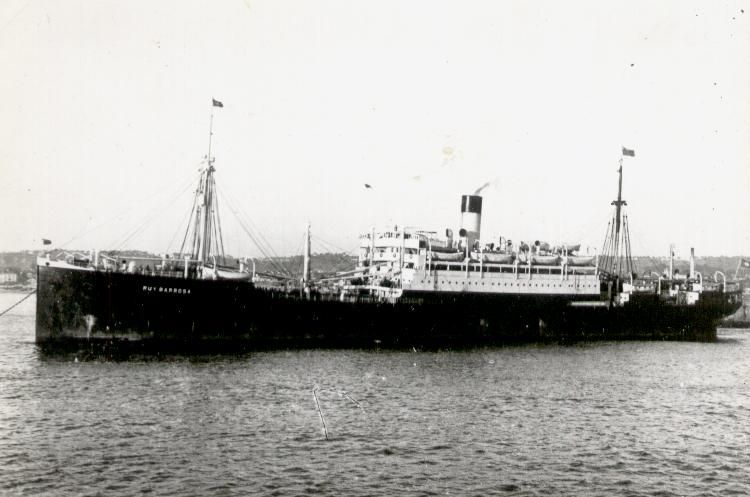
Ruy Barbosa (former Caxias, former Bahia Laura), the largest ship of Lloyd Brasileiro

By 1922, three more formerly German ships in the service of Lloyd Brasileiro had been lost. The most serious accident was the capsizing of Avare (formerly Sierra Salvada) on 16 January 1922, while undocking in the port of Hamburg, in which 39 men, including 26 Brazilian seamen, lost their lives.

In the 1920s, the majority of the formerly German ships were also gradually formally transferred to the state-owned shipping company (33 ships, 165,133 GRT). The shipping company was again in a privatization phase after the war, but this came to an end during the great shipping crisis. In 1931, the Lloyd Brasileiro was one of the 50 largest shipping companies in the world and by far the largest shipping company in South America, with 73 ships of 271,000 GRT combined. However, the company bought only a few used ships and received hardly any newbuildings. In 1939, the company's most modern ships were five small motor freighters of 2,900 GRT of the Bandeirante type, built in the Netherlands.

=== World War II ===
During World War II, Lloyd Brasileiro again received a large number of ships seized by the Brazilian government, the majority of which were Italian and Danish.

The German share was small, as a large number of ships attempted to reach home even after the outbreak of war, some of them only after the conquest of France. Some German ships were also sold to Brazil to enable others to make supply runs to German warships. Thus Lloyd Brasileiro received the modern 6,000 GRT Montevideo of Hamburg-Süd, whose sister ship Porto Alegre left Santos 14 days after the outbreak of war and was able to break through to Hamburg. The other sister ship Rio Grande did not leave Rio Grande do Sul until October 1940, supplying the auxiliary cruiser Thor and taking its prisoners to France, and became one of the most successful German blockade runners. Beginning in 1940, the NDL Brasileiro fleet was strengthened by over 20 purchases from the United States.

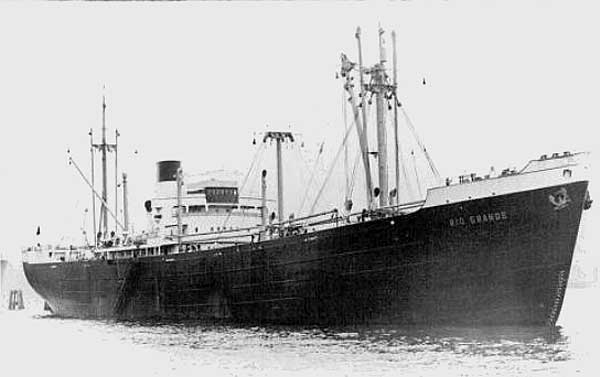
The blockade runner Rio Grande, Montevideo's sister ship

During World War II, 30 Brazilian merchant ships were sunk by German U-boats, 17 of which belonged to Lloyd Brasileiro. The first was on 15 February 1942, when U-432 sank the 5,152 GRT Buarque of Lloyd; bought from the United States in 1940; off the US coast.

When Brazil declared war on Germany on 22 August 1942, 17 ships had been sunk in the meantime and it happened after the sinking of Annibal Benévolo of the LB, Araraquara of Lloyd Nacional, Baependy of LB, Arará, Itagiba, and Jacyra, within four days by U-507 under corvette captain Harro Schacht without warning off the Brazilian coast. A total of 607 people were killed in the first three sinkings, including 270 on Baependy and 150 on Anníbal Benévolo.

=== Post-war ===
Although the company, unlike many other shipping companies in the post-war period with high shipbuilding prices, did not initially have any new ships built and only commissioned the purchase of 22 new general cargo ships between 1958 and 1967, it nevertheless fell into a financial crisis in the 1960s. A privatization contemplated in 1967 did not materialize. After an economic high in the 1970s, Lloyd Brasileiro again fell into increasing financial distress due to poor freight rates in the early 1980s and heavy debt caused by the need to build new container ships in the second half of that decade.

== Dissolution ==
In the early 1990s, the company laid up a large part of its fleet and later ceased operations for good, despite promised rescue efforts by the government. From the end of 1995 until decisions by president Fernando Henrique Cardoso in late 1997 and 5 March 1998, respectively, the company was liquidated.

== See also ==
- Arsenal de Marinha do Rio de Janeiro
- Brazil during World War I
