= SS Alcoa Puritan (1941) =

Coordinates: 28°35′N 88°22′W

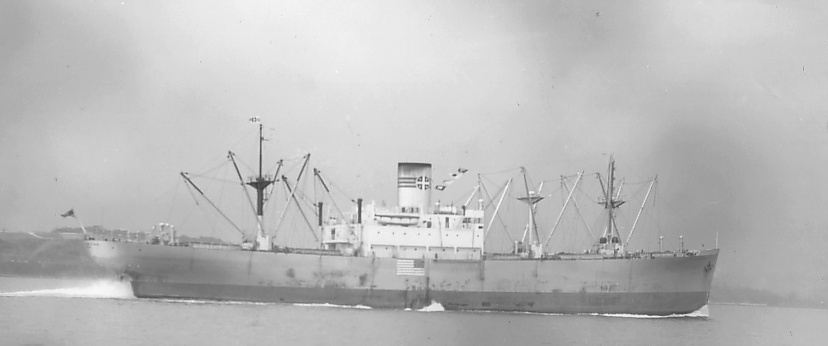
- SS Alcoa Puritan, November 9, 1941

History

United States
- Name: SS Alcoa Puritan
- Operator: Alcoa Steamship Company
- Builder: Bethlehem Shipbuilding Company, San Francisco
- Launched: 3 July 1941
- Fate: Torpedoed and sunk, 6 May 1942

General characteristics
- Type: Type C1-B cargo ship
- Tonnage: 6,795 GRT
- Length: 417 ft 9 in (127.33 m)
- Beam: 60 ft (18 m)
- Draft: 27 ft 6 in (8.38 m)
- Propulsion: Bethlehem cross-compound steam turbines; four-blade propeller
- Speed: 14 knots (26 km/h; 16 mph)
- Capacity: 8-10 passengers
- Crew: 10 officers and 33 crew
- Armament: None
- S.S. Alcoa Puritan (shipwreck and remains)
- U.S. National Register of Historic Places
- NRHP reference No.: 100002560
- Added to NRHP: June 13, 2018

SS Alcoa Puritan was a cargo ship in the service of Alcoa Steamship Company that was torpedoed and sunk in the Gulf of Mexico during World War II.

The SS Alcoa Puritan provided freight and passenger service between U.S. and Caribbean ports. The ship was typically staffed with 10 officers and 33 crew, and could also accommodate 8-10 passengers.

== Torpedoing ==
On about 1 May 1942, the SS Alcoa Puritan sailed from Port of Spain, Trinidad, alone and unarmed, to Mobile, Alabama loaded with bauxite. Newly in command of the ship was Capt. Yngvar A. Krantz. (The former master of the ship, Axel B. Axelsen, had just left command after unsuccessfully urging shoreside management that the ship be armed.) Among the ten passengers were six survivors from the torpedoed Standard Oil tanker T.C. McCobb.

By April 1942, the German submarine campaign was reaching its height. Records made public after the war revealed that 35 American merchant-marine ships were sunk in March; 42 were sunk in April, and May saw 52 more sent to the bottom.

Just before noon on 6 May 1942, a torpedo passed astern of the Puritan - its wake sighted by one of the T.C. McCobb survivors. General alarm was sounded. A submarine surfaced a few moments later, 2 nautical miles (4 km) off, and fired a warning shell that passed overhead and landed in the water ahead of the ship. Krantz ordered the ship to full speed, hoping to outrun the attacker, and steered a zig-zag course. The sub fired a few more shells that missed, but then refined its targeting and barraged the Puritan with about 70 hits over the course of about 25 minutes. The shelling laid open the ship's superstructure, perforated the funnel, broke all the windows and instrument faces, set fire to parts of the interior, and finally disabled the steering mechanism at the stern.

At about 12:30 p.m., with the ship turning in circles, Krantz ordered the engines stopped and personnel to abandon ship. Soon after everyone was in the water, the submarine fired a second torpedo which struck the ship in the engine room on the port side. The Puritan started to list heavily to port and soon sank below the surface.

The submarine approached the survivors, which had been gathered into lifeboats. The 34-year-old captain of the sub shouted across the water that he was sorry and that he hoped the survivors "make it in all right." He then gave a wave, followed his crew down a hatch, submerged, and departed.

In an hour or less, a United States Navy patrol aircraft - summoned by the Puritan's radio operator during the shelling - spotted the survivors, and at about 4:05 pm the United States Coast Guard cutter Boutwell arrived on the scene and rescued all the passengers and crew - some of them badly injured.

Postwar research revealed the attacking sub to be U-boat U-507, commanded by Kapitanleutnant Harro Schacht. Schacht was still in command of the U-Boat when it was bombed and sunk off Brazil on 13 January 1943, by U.S. Navy aircraft.

== Discovery ==
Six decades later, contractors performing deep-tow marine surveys for Shell International Exploration and Production encountered a large shipwreck about 45 nautical miles (83 km) south-southeast of the entrance to the Mississippi River, in the Mississippi Canyon area. Based on survey data and historical information, marine archaeologists identified the wreck as the Puritan. C&C Technologies was hired by Shell to conduct further investigations, which began in 2002 and continued for several years. Visual inspections by Sonsub's ROV vessel HOS Dominator found the hull mostly intact, with moderate superstructure damage. Video footage from the Puritan's resting place at 1,965 meters depth shows the "ALCOA PURITAN, NEW YORK" legend on the stern of the ship.

The C&C work formed part of a larger project concerning archaeological and biological analysis of World War II shipwrecks in the Gulf of Mexico, and particularly their artificial reef effect in deep water. Other vessels included in the study were the oil tankers Virginia, Halo, and Gulfpenn; the German U-boat U-166; the steamer Robert E. Lee; and the Anona (a steam yacht, repurposed as a freighter). All were concluded to be eligible for listing on the National Register of Historic Places, for both their historical and archaeological import.

== See also ==
- List of shipwrecks in May 1942
- National Register of Historic Places listings in Plaquemines Parish, Louisiana
