= Rio Real =

Coordinates: 11°28′S 37°56′W

- Municipality
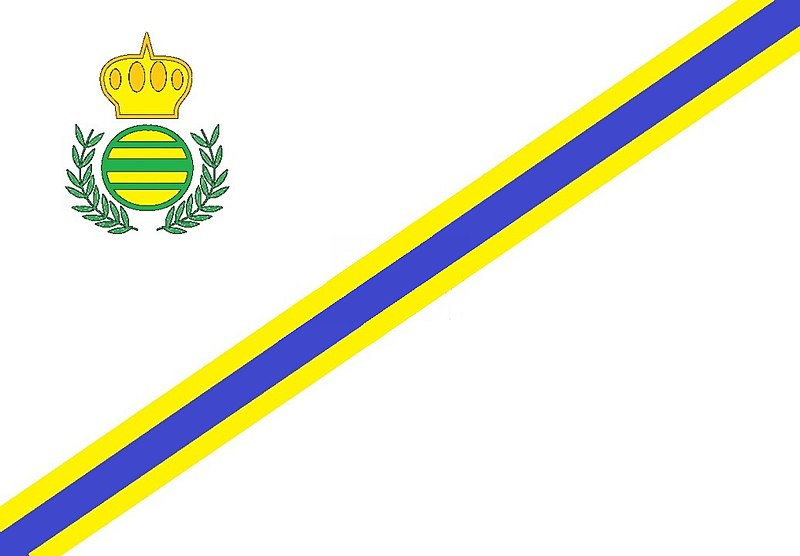
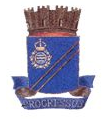
- Flag Coat of arms
- Interactive map of Rio Real
- Country: Brazil
- Region: Nordeste
- State: Bahia

Population (2020)
  - Total: 40,976
- Time zone: UTC−3 (BRT)

Rio Real is a municipality in the state of Bahia in the North-East region of Brazil. It is named for the nearby river.

== See also ==
- List of municipalities in Bahia
