= Real River (Brazil) =

River in Bahia & Sergipe, Brazil

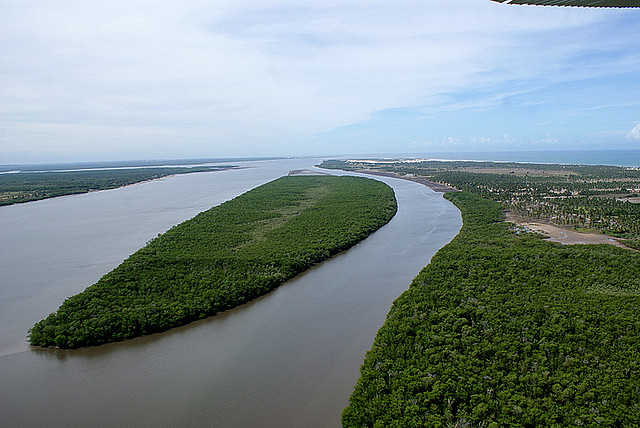

- Location of mouth

Location
- Country: Brazil

Physical characteristics
- Source
  - location: Sergipe state
- Mouth: Atlantic Ocean
  - coordinates: 11°27′S 37°21′W

The Real River or Rio Real ("Royal River") is a river in Brazil. It forms the border between the states of Sergipe to its north and Bahia to its south. It gave its name to the nearby municipality of Rio Real, Brazil.

== See also ==
- List of rivers of Sergipe
- List of rivers of Bahia
