= German submarine U-507 =

German World War II submarine

Coordinates: 1°38′N 39°52′W

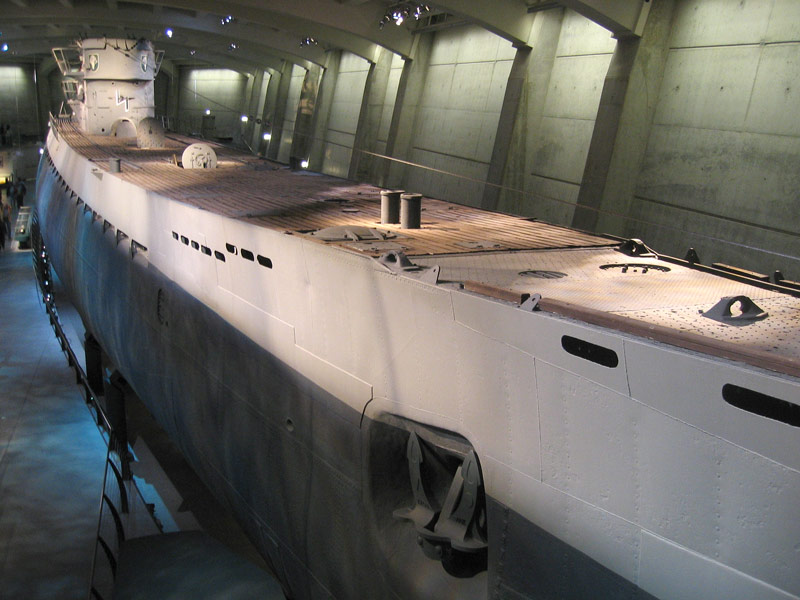
- U-505, a typical Type IXC boat

History

Nazi Germany
- Name: U-507
- Ordered: 20 October 1939
- Builder: Deutsche Werft, Hamburg
- Yard number: 303
- Laid down: 11 September 1940
- Launched: 15 July 1941
- Commissioned: 8 October 1941
- Fate: Sunk on 13 January 1943
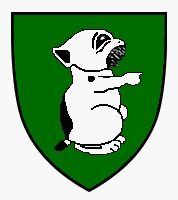
- Badge

General characteristics
- Class & type: Type IXC submarine
- Displacement: 1,120 t (1,100 long tons) surfaced; 1,232 t (1,213 long tons) submerged
- Length: 76.76 m (251 ft 10 in) o/a; 58.75 m (192 ft 9 in) pressure hull
- Beam: 6.76 m (22 ft 2 in) o/a; 4.40 m (14 ft 5 in) pressure hull
- Height: 9.60 m (31 ft 6 in)
- Draught: 4.70 m (15 ft 5 in)
- Installed power: 4,400 PS (3,200 kW; 4,300 bhp) (diesels); 1,000 PS (740 kW; 990 shp) (electric)
- Propulsion: 2 shafts; 2 × diesel engines; 2 × electric motors
- Speed: 18.2 knots (33.7 km/h; 20.9 mph) surfaced; 7.7 knots (14.3 km/h; 8.9 mph) submerged
- Range: 13,450 nmi (24,910 km; 15,480 mi) at 10 knots (19 km/h; 12 mph) surfaced; 64 nmi (119 km; 74 mi) at 4 knots (7.4 km/h; 4.6 mph) submerged
- Test depth: 230 m (750 ft)
- Complement: 4 officers, 44 enlisted
- Armament: 6 × torpedo tubes (4 bow, 2 stern); 22 × 53.3 cm (21 in) torpedoes; 1 × 10.5 cm (4.1 in) SK C/32 deck gun (180 rounds); 1 × 3.7 cm (1.5 in) SK C/30 AA gun; 1 × twin 2 cm FlaK 30 AA guns

Service record
- Part of: 4th U-boat Flotilla; 8 October 1941 – 28 February 1942; 2nd U-boat Flotilla; 1 March 1942 – 13 January 1943
- Identification codes: M 19 192
- Commanders: K.Kapt. Harro Schacht; 8 October 1941 – 13 January 1943
- Operations: 4 patrols: 1st patrol: 12 – 25 March 1942; 2nd patrol: 4 April – 4 June 1942; 3rd patrol: 4 July – 12 October 1942; 4th patrol: a. 24 – 26 November 1942; b. 28 November 1942 – 13 January 1943
- Victories: 19 merchant ships sunk (77,143 GRT); 1 merchant ship damaged (6,561 GRT)

German submarine U-507 was a Type IXC U-boat of Nazi Germany's Kriegsmarine built for service in the Second World War and the Battle of the Atlantic. She was mainly notable for two patrols she conducted during the "Second Happy Time" in mid-1942, during the first of which she caused havoc in the Gulf of Mexico amongst unprotected American shipping, and then in the second she attacked ships along the coast of Brazil, in an inexplicable and shocking attack on a neutral nation's shipping in its own waters which almost single-handedly provoked the Brazilian declaration of war on Germany.

The U-boat was built during 1941 by the Deutsche Werft shipyards in Hamburg, and commissioned on 8 October 1941, with Korvettenkapitän Harro Schacht in command. Schacht commanded the boat for its entire lifespan, receiving the Knight's Cross of the Iron Cross on 9 January 1943 in recognition of his successful patrols in the preceding year. He never wore his award however, as he was killed with his entire crew when the boat was sunk four days later.

== Design ==
German Type IXC submarines were slightly larger than the original Type IXBs. U-507 had a displacement of 1,120 tonnes (1,100 long tons) when at the surface and 1,232 tonnes (1,213 long tons) while submerged. The U-boat had a total length of 76.76 m (251 ft 10 in), a pressure hull length of 58.75 m (192 ft 9 in), a beam of 6.76 m (22 ft 2 in), a height of 9.60 m (31 ft 6 in), and a draught of 4.70 m (15 ft 5 in). The submarine was powered by two MAN M 9 V 40/46 supercharged four-stroke, nine-cylinder diesel engines producing a total of 4,400 metric horsepower (3,240 kW; 4,340 shp) for use while surfaced, two Siemens-Schuckert 2 GU 345/34 double-acting electric motors producing a total of 1,000 shaft horsepower (1,010 PS; 750 kW) for use while submerged. She had two shafts and two 1.92 m (6 ft) propellers. The boat was capable of operating at depths of up to 230 metres (750 ft).

The submarine had a maximum surface speed of 18.3 knots (33.9 km/h; 21.1 mph) and a maximum submerged speed of 7.3 knots (13.5 km/h; 8.4 mph). When submerged, the boat could operate for 63 nautical miles (117 km; 72 mi) at 4 knots (7.4 km/h; 4.6 mph); when surfaced, she could travel 13,450 nautical miles (24,910 km; 15,480 mi) at 10 knots (19 km/h; 12 mph). U-507 was fitted with six 53.3 cm (21 in) torpedo tubes (four fitted at the bow and two at the stern), 22 torpedoes, one 10.5 cm (4.13 in) SK C/32 naval gun, 180 rounds, and a 3.7 cm (1.5 in) SK C/30 as well as a 2 cm (0.79 in) C/30 anti-aircraft gun. The boat had a complement of forty-eight.

== Service history ==
=== First patrol ===
Once U-507 had completed her working up period of six months following her commissioning, she departed German waters and entered the Atlantic Ocean for her first patrol; an uneventful and simple cruise to Lorient in occupied France, which was to be her permanent home port for the remainder of her life.

=== Second patrol ===
The second patrol was more eventful, as the boat rounded Florida at the end of April 1942, taking full advantage of the lit-up settlements on the shoreline to pick and choose her targets amongst the unescorted shipping which bottlenecked between Cuba and the Floridan peninsula. Here she sank four large cargo ships in three days before following the coastline along Western Florida and Alabama, where in three more days she sank four more large unprotected ships, making full use of the failure of the local authorities to enforce either convoy regulations or the blackout. On 6 May she sank the Alcoa Puritan about 45 miles south-southeast of the mouth of the Mississippi River. On the 12 May she sank the 10,731 GRT Virginia in the mouth of the Mississippi, killing 26 sailors in an audacious attack which shocked the American authorities. Swinging south, she sank a Honduran freighter as she cruised out of the Caribbean Sea, leaving a shaken seaboard behind her. On this cruise alone she had sunk nine ships totalling 44,782 GRT.

=== Third patrol ===
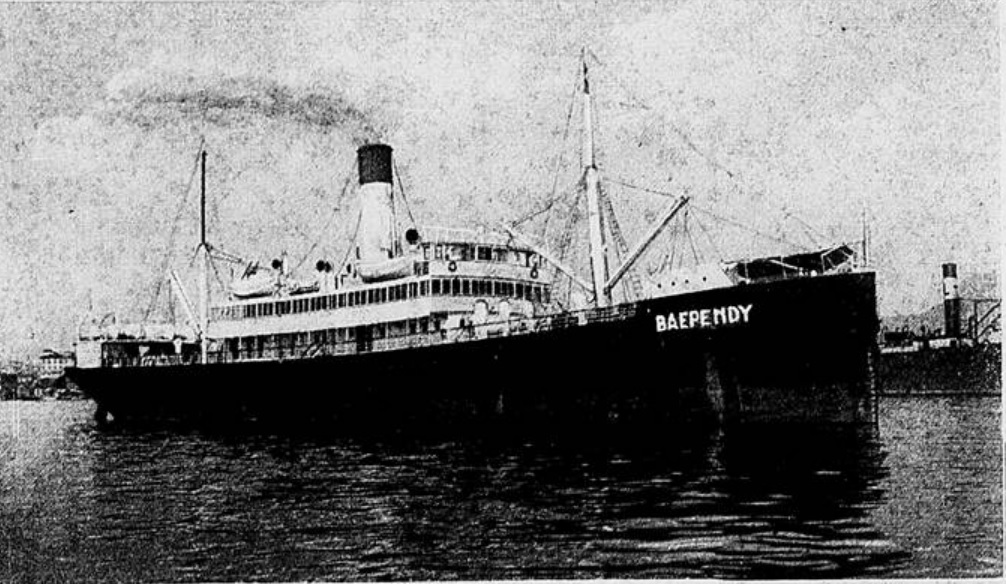
Baependy under way

Her third patrol was even more controversial, as a fruitless passage across the Atlantic brought her to the Brazilian coast in mid-August 1942. There she searched for Allied shipping hugging the coastline in Brazilian territorial waters heading for North America. Here she again saw unescorted ships and a lit coastline, and Schacht attacked without first ascertaining the nationalities of her targets. The first was the Brazilian Baependy on 15 August, which was sunk by torpedo, killing 270 people. A few hours later U-507 sank Araraquara, killing 131 people, and early on 16 August she sank Annibal Benévolo, on which 150 civilians were killed. On 17 August, U-507 sank Itagiba, within sight of the city of Valença, killing 36 people; and Arará, killing 20, as she rescued survivors from Itagiba. Two days later, the tiny sailing vessel Jacyra was sunk; and a Swedish ship was torpedoed three days after that. In one week, U-507 sank seven ships totalling 18,131 GRT, and killed over 600 people, all of them neutral citizens.

Although since February 1942 German and Italian submarines had attacked Brazilian ships, during May Brazilian aero-naval forces began to attack Axis submarines. From July popular demonstrations occurred demanding that the Brazilian government officially abandon its neutrality; the political ramifications of what Schacht and his crew had done off the Brazilian coast were enormous. The then Brazilian dictatorship went from a neutral nation somewhat favourable towards the Axis powers, to an enraged opponent in the space of few days, declaring war on Nazi Germany and Fascist Italy. Brazil would send an Expeditionary Force to the Mediterranean theatre of operations, besides the full involvement of its navy in the Battle of the Atlantic.

More importantly, Brazilian Air Force bases were made available to American naval air squadrons, thus denying the U-boats their previous advantage of hiding in Brazilian coastal waters, and giving the Allies air cover across most of the Southern Atlantic, making the job of the U-boats significantly harder. In addition, Germany's standing amongst neutral nations, particularly the formerly pro-German dictatorships of South America, was in tatters, never to recover.

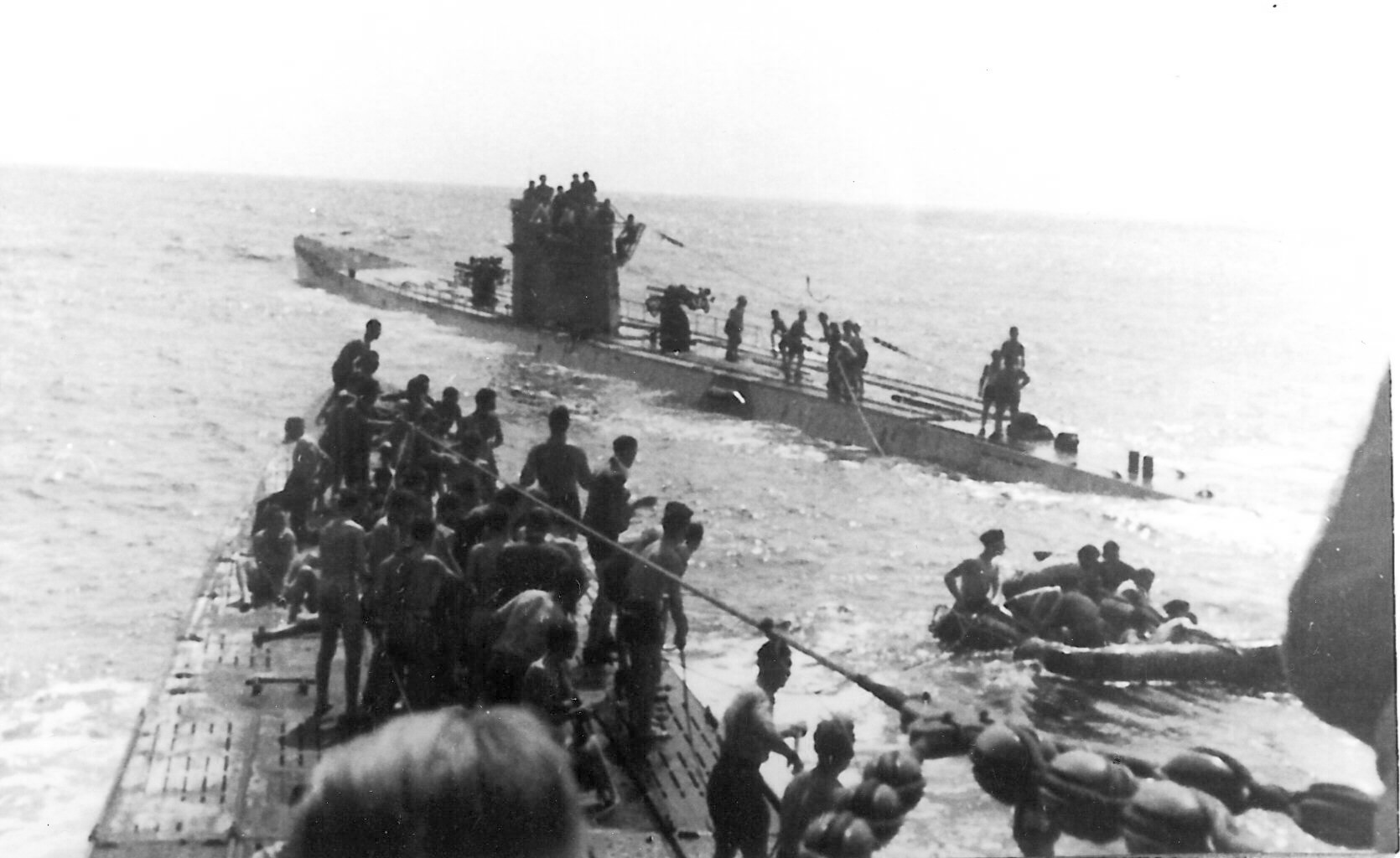
U-156 (foreground) and U-507 (background) on 15 September 1942

The third patrol of U-507, was also highly significant, as after two months ineffective cruising between the West African and Brazilian coasts of the South Atlantic, U-507 received a radio call from U-156 on 15 September reporting that she had sunk a ship carrying 1,500 Italian prisoners of war. This ship was RMS Laconia, and U-507 made all haste to aid in the rescue operation, collecting a large number of survivors on board and towing several lifeboats, until attacks by American aircraft on the rescuing submarines forced her to dive and escape. She returned to Germany with her human cargo, and there received the orders which were the result of the Laconia incident, which consisted of a total ban on aiding shipwreck survivors, except ships' officers who were to be captured for information purposes.

=== Fourth patrol ===
On her fourth and final patrol she put these new orders to full use, as she sank three British ships off the northern Brazilian coast, and captured the masters of all the ships; J. Stewart, F.H. Fenn and D. MacCallum. These victories had taken her into 1943 with a reputation for success, confirmed when her captain was informed of his Knight's Cross award. On 13 January 1943 U-507 was spotted by a United States Navy PBY Catalina aircraft of VP-83 flying from a newly available Brazilian base, which dropped several depth charges on the boat. The site of the attack was 330 miles off the Brazilian coast at Cape São Roque (Cape of Saint Roch). There were no survivors from the entire crew of 56 including the three captives and the boat's new captain Heinz Radau, who was conducting an observation and familiarization patrol.

== Summary of raiding history ==
| Date | Ship Name | Nationality | Tonnage (GRT) | Fate |
|---|---|---|---|---|
| 30 April 1942 | Federal | United States | 2,881 | Sunk |
| 4 May 1942 | Norlindo | United States | 2,686 | Sunk |
| 5 May 1942 | Munger T. Ball | United States | 5,104 | Sunk |
| 5 May 1942 | Joseph M. Cudahy | United States | 6,950 | Sunk |
| 6 May 1942 | Alcoa Puritan | United States | 6,759 | Sunk |
| 7 May 1942 | Ontario | Honduras | 3,099 | Sunk |
| 8 May 1942 | Torny | Norway | 2,424 | Sunk |
| 12 May 1942 | Virginia | United States | 10,731 | Sunk |
| 13 May 1942 | Gulfprince | United States | 6,561 | Damaged |
| 16 May 1942 | Amapala | Honduras | 4,148 | Sunk |
| 15 August 1942 | Baependy | Brazil | 4,801 | Sunk |
| 15 August 1942 | Araraquara | Brazil | 4,872 | Sunk |
| 16 August 1942 | Annibal Benévolo | Brazil | 1,905 | Sunk |
| 17 August 1942 | Itagiba | Brazil | 2,169 | Sunk |
| 17 August 1942 | Arará | Brazil | 1,075 | Sunk |
| 19 August 1942 | Jacyra | Brazil | 89 | Sunk |
| 22 August 1942 | Hammaren | Sweden | 3,220 | Sunk |
| 27 December 1942 | Oakbank | United Kingdom | 5,154 | Sunk |
| 3 January 1943 | Baron Dechmont | United Kingdom | 3,675 | Sunk |
| 8 January 1943 | Yorkwood | United Kingdom | 5,401 | Sunk |

== Bibliography ==
- Busch, Rainer; Röll, Hans-Joachim (1999). German U-boat commanders of World War II : a biographical dictionary. Translated by Brooks, Geoffrey. London, Annapolis, Md: Greenhill Books, Naval Institute Press. ISBN 1-55750-186-6.
- Busch, Rainer; Röll, Hans-Joachim (1999). Der U-Boot-Krieg, 1939-1945: Deutsche U-Boot-Verluste von September 1939 bis Mai 1945 [The U-Boat War, 1939-1945: German U-boat losses from September 1939 to May 1945] (in German). Vol. IV. Hamburg, Berlin, Bonn: Mittler. ISBN 3-8132-0514-2.
- Carey, Alan C. Galloping Ghosts of the Brazilian Coast. iUniverse, Inc. 2004. ISBN 0595315275
- Gröner, Erich; Jung, Dieter; Maass, Martin (1991). "U-boats and Mine Warfare Vessels". German Warships 1815–1945. Vol. 2. Translated by Thomas, Keith; Magowan, Rachel. London: Conway Maritime Press. ISBN 0-85177-593-4.
- Kemp, Paul (1999). U-Boats Destroyed – German Submarine Losses in the World Wars. London: Arms & Armour. ISBN 1-85409-515-3.
- Sharpe, Peter (1998). U-Boat Fact File. Great Britain: Midland Publishing. ISBN 1-85780-072-9.
- Scheina, Robert L. Latin America's Wars Volume II: The Age of the Professional Soldier, 1900–2001. Potomac Books, 2003. ISBN 978-1574884524
