= Convoy ON 122 =

Convoy during naval battles of the Second World War

- Part of Battle of the Atlantic
Date	22–25 August 1942
Location	North Atlantic
Result	German victory

Belligerents
United Kingdom; Norway	Germany

Commanders and leaders
CAPT S.N. White RNR; LCDR J.V. Waterhouse RN	BdU: Karl Dönitz

Strength
37 merchant ships 5 escort ships	9 submarines

Casualties and losses
4 merchants sunk (17,235 GRT); 40 killed/drowned	

Convoy ON 122 was a trade convoy of merchant ships during the Second World War. It was the 122nd of the numbered series of ON convoys Outbound from the British Isles to North America. The ships departed Liverpool on 15 August 1942 and were joined on 17 August by Escort Group B6 of the Mid-Ocean Escort Force.

== Background ==
As western Atlantic coastal convoys brought an end to the second happy time, Admiral Karl Dönitz, the Befehlshaber der U-Boote (commander in chief of U-Boats), shifted focus to the mid-Atlantic to avoid aircraft patrols. Although convoy routing was less predictable in the mid-ocean, Dönitz anticipated that the increased numbers of U-boats being produced would be able to effectively search the area with the advantage of intelligence gained through B-Dienst decryption of British Naval Cypher Number 3. However, of the 180 trans-Atlantic convoys sailing from the end of July 1942 until the end of April 1943, only 20 percent lost ships to U-boat attack.

The Norwegian-manned corvettes of Escort Group B6 fought three of these convoy battles in sequential voyages with convoys SC 104, ON 144, and HX 217.

== Discovery ==
U-135 discovered and reported the convoy on 22 August while patrolling a formerly assigned station after having missed the signal to change position. The initial report caused some confusion because of the unexpected position and a coding error, but after U-135 sent two clarifying messages while shadowing the convoy, the wolf pack Lohs was ordered to converge on the convoy.

== Stalking ==
While the Norwegian corvettes investigated HF/DF bearings provided by Viscount and Stockport on 23 August, Viscount conserved fuel by declining to engage in long daylight stern chases with U-boats. Viscount and Potentilla attacked HF/DF contacts more aggressively through the hours of darkness, but were satisfied by simply forcing the U-boats to submerge rather than conducting sustained depth charge attacks.

== Attack ==
Visibility was reduced to 7,000 yards with patchy squalls under overcast skies on 24 August. As dusk approached, the escort had located only four of the nine U-boats in contact with the convoy. The convoy's course was altered to 267° at 2300Z. U-605 torpedoed Katvaldis and Sheaf Mount on the starboard side of the convoy an hour after the course alteration. Viscount obtained a RADAR contact and forced the submarine to submerge. As Viscount was dropping depth charges, U-176 and U-438 entered the front of the convoy to torpedo Trolla and Empire Breeze.

== Disengagement ==
The convoy escorts effectively intercepted attacks through the pre-dawn hours of 25 August. The calm sea conditions were favourable for the Type 271 centimeter-wavelength RADAR with which all the escorts were equipped, and prompt counter-attacks prevented the U-boats from reaching torpedo launch positions. A depth charge attack by Eglantine holed the conning tower of U-605. U-135, U-174 and U-438 were also damaged by depth charges. The shadowing U-boats lost contact after the convoy entered heavy fog after daybreak on 25 August, and discontinued pursuit on 26 August. U-256 was under repair for more than a year after being bombed in the Bay of Biscay on 31 August following depth charge damage from Viscount and Potentilla. U-438 aided U-256 reaching port, and U-174 refueled three Lohs U-boats before returning to France to repair damage. U-705 suffered several casualties when hit by gunfire from the convoy escorts; and was sunk in the Bay of Biscay by Armstrong Whitworth Whitleys of No. 77 Squadron RAF on 3 September.

The ships in the convoy dispersed off Cape Cod on 3 September to proceed independently to North American ports.

== Ships in the convoy ==
=== Allied merchant ships ===
A total of 37 merchant vessels joined the convoy, either in Liverpool or later in the voyage.

Name	Flag	Dead	Tonnage (GRT)	Cargo	Notes
Amberton (1928)	United Kingdom		5,377		Destination Halifax
Athelprince (1926)	United Kingdom		8,782		Carried convoy commodore CAPT S.N. White RNR
Atland (1910)	Sweden		5,203	Coal	Destination Saint John
Baron Herries (1940)	United Kingdom		4,574		Destination New York City
City of Lancaster (1924)	United Kingdom		3,041	General cargo	Destination New York City
Empire Breeze (1941)	United Kingdom	1	7,457	In ballast	Sunk by U-176 or U-438
Empire Chamois (1918)	United Kingdom		5,684		Destination New York City
Empire Flamingo (1917)	United Kingdom		4,994		Returned to the Clyde
Empire Wagtail (1919)	United Kingdom		4,893		Destination New York City
Fintra (1918)	United Kingdom		2,089		Destination Saint John
Gloxinia (1920)	United Kingdom		3,336		Destination New York City
Inger Elizabeth (1920)	Norway		2,166	Coal	Destination Halifax
Inger Toft (1920)	United Kingdom		2,190		Destination Sydney
Ingerfire (1905)	Norway		3,835	Coal	Destination Sydney
Ingman (1907)	United Kingdom		3,169		Destination Sydney
Isobel (1929)	Panama		1,515		Destination Halifax
Jan (1920)	Norway		1,946		Destination Herring Cove, Nova Scotia
Katvaldis (1907)	United Kingdom	3	3,163	In ballast	Sunk by U-605
Kolsnaren (1923)	Sweden		2,465		Destination New York City
Lifland (1920)	Denmark		2,254		Destination Montreal
Mariposa (1914)	United Kingdom		3,807		Destination New York City
Merchant Royal (1928)	United Kingdom		5,008		Destination Boston
Modlin (1906)	Poland		3,569		Destination Halifax
Parismina (1908)	United States		4,732		Destination Boston
Ramava (1900)	Latvia		2,141		Destination Sydney
Rio Branco (1924)	Norway		3,210		Destination Sydney
Rolf Jarl (1920)	Norway		1,917	Coal	Destination Halifax
Sheaf Mount (1924)	United Kingdom	31	5,017	In ballast	Sunk by U-605
Silverelm (1924)	United Kingdom		4,351	General cargo	Destination New York City
Sirehei (1907)	Norway		3,888		Destination Sydney
Souliotis (1917)	Greece		4,299		Destination Halifax
Stad Arnhem (1920)	Netherlands		3,819		Destination New York City
Start Point (1919)	United Kingdom		5,293		Destination Botwood
Stockport (1911)	United Kingdom		1,583		convoy rescue ship
Tenax (1925)	United Kingdom		3,846		Destination Sydney
Trolla (1923)	Norway	5	1,598	In ballast	Sunk by U-438
Van de Velde (1919)	Netherlands		6,389	General cargo	Destination New York City

=== Convoy escorts ===
The armed military ships of Escort Group B6, from the Mid-Ocean Escort Force, escorted the convoy during much of its journey.

Name	Flag	Type	Joined	Left
HNoMS Andenes (K01)	Royal Norwegian Navy	Flower-class corvette	17 Aug 1942	3 Sep 1942
HNoMS Eglantine (K197)	Royal Norwegian Navy	Flower-class corvette	17 Aug 1942	3 Sep 1942
HNoMS Montbretia (K208)	Royal Norwegian Navy	Flower-class corvette	17 Aug 1942	3 Sep 1942
HNoMS Potentilla (K214)	Royal Norwegian Navy	Flower-class corvette	17 Aug 1942	3 Sep 1942
HMS Viscount (D92)	Royal Navy	Modified long-range V-class destroyer	17 Aug 1942	3 Sep 1942

== See also ==
- Convoy Battles of World War II
