= German submarine U-438 =

German World War II submarine

History

Nazi Germany
- Name: U-438
- Ordered: 16 October 1939
- Builder: Schichau-Werke, Danzig
- Yard number: 1480
- Laid down: 25 April 1940
- Launched: 6 September 1941
- Commissioned: 22 November 1941
- Fate: Sunk on 6 May 1943

General characteristics
- Class & type: Type VIIC submarine
- Displacement: 769 tonnes (757 long tons) surfaced; 871 t (857 long tons) submerged
- Length: 67.10 m (220 ft 2 in) o/a; 50.50 m (165 ft 8 in) pressure hull
- Beam: 6.20 m (20 ft 4 in) o/a; 4.70 m (15 ft 5 in) pressure hull
- Height: 9.60 m (31 ft 6 in)
- Draught: 4.74 m (15 ft 7 in)
- Installed power: 2,800–3,200 PS (2,100–2,400 kW; 2,800–3,200 bhp) (diesels); 750 PS (550 kW; 740 shp) (electric)
- Propulsion: 2 shafts; 2 × diesel engines; 2 × electric motors
- Speed: 17.7 knots (32.8 km/h; 20.4 mph) surfaced; 7.6 knots (14.1 km/h; 8.7 mph) submerged
- Range: 8,500 nmi (15,700 km; 9,800 mi) at 10 knots (19 km/h; 12 mph) surfaced; 80 nmi (150 km; 92 mi) at 4 knots (7.4 km/h; 4.6 mph) submerged
- Test depth: 230 m (750 ft); Crush depth: 250–295 m (820–968 ft)
- Complement: 4 officers, 40–56 enlisted
- Armament: 5 × 53.3 cm (21 in) torpedo tubes (four bow, one stern); 14 × torpedoes; 1 × 8.8 cm (3.46 in) deck gun (220 rounds); 1 x 2 cm (0.79 in) C/30 AA gun

Service record
- Part of: 8th U-boat Flotilla; 22 November 1941 – 31 July 1942; 9th U-boat Flotilla; 1 August 1942 – 6 May 1943
- Identification codes: M 42 302
- Commanders: Kptlt. Rudolf Franzius; 22 November 1941 – 29 March 1943; K.Kapt. Heinrich Heinsohn; 30 March – 6 May 1943
- Operations: 4 patrols: 1st patrol: 1 August – 3 September 1942; 2nd patrol: 6 October – 19 November 1942; 3rd patrol: 31 December 1942 – 16 February 1943; 4th patrol: 31 March – 6 May 1943
- Victories: 3 merchant ships sunk (12,045 GRT); 1 merchant ship damaged (5,496 GRT)

German submarine U-438 was a Type VIIC U-boat of Nazi Germany's Kriegsmarine during World War II.

The submarine was laid down on 25 April 1940 at the Schichau-Werke yard as yard number 1480 in Danzig, launched on 6 September 1941 and commissioned on 22 November 1941 under the command of Kapitänleutnant Rudolf Franzius.

The city of Berlin adopted the submarine within the popular sponsorship programme (Patenschaftsprogramm), organising gifts and holidays for the crew and earning her the honorary name of U-438 Berlin. The U-boat served with the 8th U-Boat Flotilla for her training and later with the 9th Flotilla from 1 August 1942 to her loss on 6 May 1943. U-438 completed four patrols, sinking three ships, totalling 12,045 gross register tons (GRT) and damaging one ship totalling 5,496 GRT.

She was a member of ten wolfpacks.

== Design ==
German Type VIIC submarines were preceded by the shorter Type VIIB submarines. U-438 had a displacement of 769 tonnes (757 long tons) when at the surface and 871 tonnes (857 long tons) while submerged. She had a total length of 67.10 m (220 ft 2 in), a pressure hull length of 50.50 m (165 ft 8 in), a beam of 6.20 m (20 ft 4 in), a height of 9.60 m (31 ft 6 in), and a draught of 4.74 m (15 ft 7 in). The submarine was powered by two Germaniawerft F46 four-stroke, six-cylinder supercharged diesel engines producing a total of 2,800 to 3,200 metric horsepower (2,060 to 2,350 kW; 2,760 to 3,160 shp) for use while surfaced, two AEG GU 460/8–27 double-acting electric motors producing a total of 750 metric horsepower (550 kW; 740 shp) for use while submerged. She had two shafts and two 1.23 m (4 ft) propellers. The boat was capable of operating at depths of up to 230 metres (750 ft).

The submarine had a maximum surface speed of 17.7 knots (32.8 km/h; 20.4 mph) and a maximum submerged speed of 7.6 knots (14.1 km/h; 8.7 mph). When submerged, the boat could operate for 80 nautical miles (150 km; 92 mi) at 4 knots (7.4 km/h; 4.6 mph); when surfaced, she could travel 8,500 nautical miles (15,700 km; 9,800 mi) at 10 knots (19 km/h; 12 mph). U-438 was fitted with five 53.3 cm (21 in) torpedo tubes (four fitted at the bow and one at the stern), fourteen torpedoes, one 8.8 cm (3.46 in) SK C/35 naval gun, 220 rounds, and a 2 cm (0.79 in) C/30 anti-aircraft gun. The boat had a complement of between forty-four and sixty.

== Service history ==
=== First patrol ===
U-438 sailed from Kiel in Germany, on 1 August 1942 and headed for the mid-Atlantic. On 10 August she took part in a "wolfpack" attack on Convoy SC 94, south of Iceland. She fired a spread of torpedoes simultaneously with U-660, hitting the Greek 4,439 GRT cargo ship Condylis and the British 6,008 GRT Oregon on the port side, while U-660 hit them from starboard. Both ships, badly damaged, fell behind the main convoy and were sunk by U-438 several hours later.

On 11 August U-438 joined Wolfpack 'Lohs', which operated in the north Atlantic. On 25 August U-438 attacked convoy ON 122, which she had been stalking since the 22nd, sinking the Norwegian 1,598 GRT merchant ship Trolla. Several hours later U-438 was detected on radar by the Norwegian Flower-class corvette HNoMS Eglantine, and within a few minutes the ship spotted the surfaced U-boat in fog and opened fire with her 4-inch gun, before attacking with depth charges as U-438 crash-dived. The corvette continued to attack, forcing the U-boat to the surface after the bow compartment was flooded. Unable to dive, U-438 escaped in the fog. After making repairs she was ordered to return to base, arriving at Brest in occupied France, on 3 September.

=== Second patrol ===
U-438 sailed from Brest on 6 October 1942. On 2 November in an attack on Convoy SC 107 about 450 miles east of Belle Isle, she torpedoed the British 5,496 GRT cargo ship Hartington, which had already been damaged by a torpedo from U-522, the abandoned ship was finally sunk by U-521 two hours later. U-438 returned to Brest on 19 November.

=== Third patrol ===
U-438 left Brest again on 31 December 1942 for another mid-Atlantic patrol, but had no successes before returning to base on 16 February.

=== Fourth patrol and loss ===
Since her commander, Rudolf Franzius, was ill, Kapitänleutnant Heinrich Heinsohn, originally commander of U-573 and recently returned from Spanish internment, was given command of U-438. She sailed from Brest on 31 March 1943 and was unsuccessfully attacked by a Catalina flying boat of 5 squadron, RAF on 4 May 1943. On 6 May the U-boat was sunk with all hands, north-east Newfoundland by depth charges from the Egret-class sloop HMS Pelican.

=== Wolfpacks ===
U-438 took part in ten wolfpacks, namely:

- Lohs (11 – 25 August 1942)
- Tümmler (6 – 9 October 1942)
- Panther (13 – 20 October 1942)
- Veilchen (20 October – 5 November 1942)
- Habicht (11 – 19 January 1943)
- Haudegen (19 January – 8 February 1943)
- Adler (11 – 13 April 1943)
- Meise (13 – 22 April 1943)
- Specht (22 April – 4 May 1943)
- Fink (4 – 6 May 1943)

== Summary of raiding history ==
| Date | Ship Name | Nationality | Tonnage (GRT) | Fate |
|---|---|---|---|---|
| 10 August 1942 | Condylis | Greece | 4,439 | Sunk |
| 10 August 1942 | Oregon | United Kingdom | 6,008 | Sunk |
| 25 August 1942 | Trolla | Norway | 1,598 | Sunk |
| 2 November 1942 | Hartington | United Kingdom | 5,496 | Damaged |

== Bibliography ==
- Bishop, Chris (2006). Kriegsmarine U-Boats, 1939-45. London: Amber Books. ISBN 978-1-904687-96-2.
- Busch, Rainer; Röll, Hans-Joachim (1999). German U-boat commanders of World War II : a biographical dictionary. Translated by Brooks, Geoffrey. London, Annapolis, Md: Greenhill Books, Naval Institute Press. ISBN 1-55750-186-6.
- Busch, Rainer; Röll, Hans-Joachim (1999). Deutsche U-Boot-Verluste von September 1939 bis Mai 1945 [German U-boat losses from September 1939 to May 1945]. Der U-Boot-Krieg (in German). Vol. IV. Hamburg, Berlin, Bonn: Mittler. ISBN 3-8132-0514-2.
- Edwards, Bernard (1996). Dönitz and the Wolf Packs - The U-boats at War. Cassell Military Classics. pp. 91, 98, 99, 197, 200. ISBN 0-304-35203-9.
- Gröner, Erich; Jung, Dieter; Maass, Martin (1991). U-boats and Mine Warfare Vessels. German Warships 1815–1945. Vol. 2. Translated by Thomas, Keith; Magowan, Rachel. London: Conway Maritime Press. ISBN 0-85177-593-4.
- Kemp, Paul (1999). U-Boats Destroyed - German Submarine Losses in the World Wars. London: Arms & Armour. ISBN 1-85409-515-3.
