= List of shipwrecks in August 1942 =

Ships that were lost, foundered, grounded or lost in August 1942

The list of shipwrecks in August 1942 includes all ships sunk, foundered, grounded, or otherwise lost during August 1942.

== 1 August ==
For the foundering of the British cargo ship Lavington Court on this day, see the entry for 19 July 1942.

List of shipwrecks: 1 August 1942
Ship	State	Description
Clan Macnaughton	United Kingdom	World War II: The cargo ship was torpedoed and sunk in the Atlantic Ocean 180 nautical miles (330 km) east of Tobago (11°54′N 54°25′W) by U-155 (Kriegsmarine) with the loss of five of her 82 crew. Survivors were rescued by Empire Bede (United Kingdom).
Empire Imp	United Kingdom	The Maple-type tug capsized and sank at Pembroke Dock, Pembrokeshire.
Empire Ocean	United Kingdom	World War II: Convoy ON 115: The cargo ship ran aground 1 1/2 nautical miles (2.8 km) east of Shingle Head, Dominion of Newfoundland. She was on a voyage from Newport, Monmouthshire to Halifax, Nova Scotia, Canada. She was refloated and taken in tow for Aquaforte, Dominion of Newfoundland, but consequently sank off Aquaforte (47°01′N 52°50′W).
F 334	Kriegsmarine	World War II: The Type A Marinefährprahm was torpedoed and sunk in the Bay of Iwan Baba by D-3 and SM-3 (both Soviet Navy). Twelve of her crew were killed and seven were rescued, one later dying of his wounds. F 334 was raised, repaired and returned to service as an auxiliary.
Kalewa	United Kingdom	The cargo ship collided with Boringia (United Kingdom) and sank 300 nautical miles (560 km) south of Cape Town, Union of South Africa (30°16′S 13°38′E). Kalewa was on a voyage from Glasgow, Renfrewshire to Table Bay.
Kastor	Greece	World War II: The cargo ship was torpedoed and sunk in the Atlantic Ocean by Enrico Tazzoli (Regia Marina) with the loss of four of her 35 crew.
Kentar	Netherlands	World War II: The cargo ship was torpedoed and sunk in the Atlantic Ocean 130 nautical miles (240 km) south east of Barbados (11°52′N 57°30′W) by U-155 (Kriegsmarine) with the loss of seventeen of her 79 crew.
Krest'janin	Soviet Union	World War II: The cargo ship was torpedoed and sunk in the Barents Sea 10 nautical miles (19 km) west of Mezhdysharskiy Island (71°08′N 52°19′E) by U-601 (Kriegsmarine) with the loss of seven of the 45 people aboard.
Meiwa Maru	Japan	World War II: The cargo ship as torpedoed and sunk in the Pacific Ocean 12 nautical miles (22 km) south south east of Shiriya-saki, Hokkaido (41°12′N 141°36′E) by USS Narwhal (United States Navy).
St. Simon	Egypt	World War II: The sailing ship as shelled and sunk in the Mediterranean Sea 35 nautical miles (65 km) north west of Beirut, Lebanon by U-77 (Kriegsmarine). Her crew survived.
No. 225	Soviet Navy	The MO-2-class patrol vessel was lost on this date.

== 2 August ==
List of shipwrecks: 2 August 1942
Ship	State	Description
Flora II	United Kingdom	World War II: The cargo ship was torpedoed and sunk in the Atlantic Ocean 60 nautical miles (110 km) south east of Vestmannaeyjar, Iceland (62°45′N 19°07′W) by U-254 (Kriegsmarine). All 30 people aboard were rescued by the fishing trawler Juni ( Iceland).
Maldonado	Uruguay	World War II: The cargo ship was torpedoed and sunk in the Atlantic Ocean 250 nautical miles (460 km) south south east of Bermuda (28°20′N 63°10′W) by U-510 (Kriegsmarine). All 49 crew survived but her captain was taken prisoner. Survivors were rescued by RMS Capetown Castle (United Kingdom), a United States Navy ship, or reached land in their lifeboats.
Molotov	Soviet Navy	World War II: The Kirov-class cruiser was torpedoed and severely damaged in the Black Sea by Heinkel He 111 aircraft of 6 Staffeln, Kampfgeschwader 26, Luftwaffe. Repairs took until 31 July 1943 to complete.
R-9	Kriegsmarine	World War II: The Type R-2 minesweeper was sunk by British aircraft at Bardia, Libya.
R-11	Kriegsmarine	World War II: The Type R-2 minesweeper was sunk by British aircraft at Bardia.
Treminnard	United Kingdom	World War II: The cargo ship was torpedoed and sunk in the Atlantic Ocean 200 nautical miles (370 km) east of Trinidad (10°40′N 57°07′W) by U-160 (Kriegsmarine). Her 39 crew were rescued by Rio San Juan (Argentina).
Zenyo Maru	Imperial Japanese Army	World War II: The Zenyo Maru-class anti-aircraft transport was torpedoed and sunk in the Malacca Strait (05°36′N 99°53′E) north of Penang, Malaya by HNLMS O 23 (Royal Netherlands Navy). 19 gunners and 6 crewmen killed.
No. 211	Soviet Navy	World War II: The MO-class guard ship struck a mine and sank in the Baltic Sea.
No. 225	Soviet Navy	World War II: The MO-class guard ship struck a mine and sank in the Baltic Sea.

== 3 August ==
List of shipwrecks: 3 August 1942
Ship	State	Description
Belgian Soldier	Belgium	World War II: Convoy ON 115: The cargo ship was torpedoed and damaged in the Atlantic Ocean by U-553 (Kriegsmarine). She then straggled behind the convoy and was torpedoed and sunk either the next day, or on 7 August, 300 nautical miles (560 km) east of Cape Race Dominion of Newfoundland (45°52′N 47°13′W) by U-607 (Kriegsmarine) with the loss of 21 of her 60 crew.
Bombay	United Kingdom	World War II: The fishing trawler was and sunk in the Atlantic Ocean south of Iceland (approximately 62°N 18°W) by U-605 (Kriegsmarine) with the loss of all thirteen crew.
Dureenbee	Australia	World War II: Attack on the Dureenbee: The fishing trawler was shelled and machine gunned, in the Pacific Ocean off Moruya, New South Wales by I-175 (Imperial Japanese Navy) and ran aground after her crew were rescued by another fishing trawler.
RFA Havsten	Royal Fleet Auxiliary	World War II: The tanker was torpedoed and shelled in the Atlantic Ocean by U-160 (Kriegsmarine with the loss of two of her 33 crew. One of the survivors was taken as a prisoner of war. She was torpedoed and sunk on 6 August (11°18′N 54°45′W) by Italian submarine Enrico Tazzoli (Regia Marina).
Lochkatrine	United Kingdom	World War II: Convoy ON 115: The cargo ship was torpedoed and sunk in the Atlantic Ocean east of Cape Race, Dominion of Newfoundland (45°52′N 46°44′W) by U-552 (Kriegsmarine) with the loss of nine of the 90 people aboard. Survivors were rescued by HMCS Agassiz and HMCS Hamilton (both Royal Canadian Navy).
MO-212	Soviet Navy	World War II: The MO-4-class submarine chaser (56 GRT) was sunk by a mine north of the Demanstein Banks in the Gulf of Finland. Nine crew were killed.
Monviso	Italy	World War II: The transport ship was torpedoed and sunk in the Mediterranean Sea off the coast of Libya by HMS Thorn (Royal Navy).
Naniwa Maru	Japan	World War II: The Muko Maru-class auxiliary transport ship was torpedoed and sunk in the Pacific Ocean off Truk, South Seas Mandate (7°17′N 150°46′E) by USS Gudgeon (United States Navy) with the loss of 31 lives.
HS 1 Schleswig-Holstein	Kriegsmarine	World War II: The guard ship was sunk in the English Channel off the coast of Brittany, France by Royal Navy motor gun boats.
Tricula	United Kingdom	World War II: The tanker was torpedoed and sunk in the Atlantic Ocean 250 nautical miles (460 km) north east of Trinidad (11°35′N 56°51′W) by U-108 (Kriegsmarine) with the loss of 47 of her 58 crew. Survivors were rescued by Rio San Juan (Argentina).
Tsh-39	Soviet Navy	World War II: The auxiliary minesweeper was sunk by a mine north of the Demanstein Banks in the Gulf of Finland. Nine crew were killed.
U-335	Kriegsmarine	World War II: The Type VIIC submarine was torpedoed and sunk in the Atlantic Ocean south east of the Faroe Islands by HMS Saracen (Royal Navy) with the loss of 43 of her 44 crew.

== 4 August ==
List of shipwrecks: 4 August 1942
Ship	State	Description
Empire Arnold	United Kingdom	World War II: Convoy EF 6: The cargo ship was torpedoed and sunk in the Atlantic Ocean 500 nautical miles (930 km) east of Trinidad (10°45′N 52°30′W) by U-155 (Kriegsmarine) with the loss of nine of her 57 crew. Her captain was taken aboard U-155 as a prisoner of war, other survivors were rescued by Dalvangen (Norway).
Empire Ocean	United Kingdom	The 419-foot (128 m), 6,765-ton cargo ship ran aground on Shingle Head, Newfoundland. The vessel was pulled off the next day and sank under tow at 47°01′N 52°50′W.
Havsten	Norway	World War II: The tanker was torpedoed and damaged in the Atlantic Ocean (10°25′N 56°00′W) by U-160 (Kriegsmarine) with the loss of one of her 33 crew. Havsten was scuttled two days later (11°18′N 54°45′W) by Enrico Tazzoli (Regia Marina).
Richmond Castle	United Kingdom	World War II: The refrigerated cargo ship was torpedoed and sunk in the Atlantic Ocean south east of Cape Farewell, Greenland (50°25′N 35°05′W) by U-176 (Kriegsmarine) with the loss of fourteen of her 64 crew. Survivors were rescued by Irish Pine (Ireland), Hororata (United Kingdom) and HMS Sunflower (Royal Navy).
USS Tucker	United States Navy	USS Tucker World War II: The Mahan-class destroyer struck a mine late on 3 August and sank in the Pacific Ocean off Espiritu Santo, New Hebrides with the loss of six of her 158 crew early on 4 August.
U-372	Kriegsmarine	World War II: The Type VIIC submarine was depth charged and sunk in the Mediterranean Sea off Haifa, Palestine by a Vickers Wellington aircraft of 221 Squadron, Royal Air Force and by HMS Croome, HMS Sikh, HMS Tetcott and HMS Zulu (all Royal Navy). Her 48 crew survived.
Vincent Comoleyre	France	World War II: The fishing vessel struck a mine and sank in the Bay of Biscay.

== 5 August ==
List of shipwrecks: 5 August 1942
Ship	State	Description
Arletta	United Kingdom	World War II: Convoy ON 115: The tanker straggled behind the convoy. She was torpedoed and sunk in the Atlantic Ocean south south west of Cape Race, Dominion of Newfoundland (44°44′N 55°22′W) by U-458 (Kriegsmarine) with the loss of 36 of her 41 crew. Survivors were rescued by USCGC Menemsha ( United States Coast Guard).
Brasil Maru	Imperial Japanese Navy	World War II: The Argentina Maru-class transport ship was torpedoed and sunk in the Pacific Ocean 130 nautical miles (240 km) north west of Truk, South Seas Mandate (09°51′N 150°46′E) by USS Greenling (United States Navy). Her captain, 56 crewmen and an unknown number of passengers were killed. There were 212 survivors: Choan Maru No. 2 Go (Imperial Japanese Navy) rescued 54 survivors on 15 August, and 53 on 29 August, Takunan Maru No. 10 (Imperial Japanese Navy) rescued 52, a further 52 survivors reached Ono Island on 16 August, and one was rescued and captured by USS Greenling after the sinking.
Draco	Netherlands	World War II: The coaster was shelled and sunk in the Atlantic Ocean 325 nautical miles (602 km) east of Barbados (11°05′N 53°30′W) by U-155 (Kriegsmarine). Her sixteen crew survived. They were either rescued by Athelbrae (United Kingdom) or landed in Suriname in their lifeboat.
F 134	Kriegsmarine	The Type A Marinefahrprahm was sunk on this date. She was later salvaged and used as an auxiliary.
Pohjanlahti	Finland	Continuation War: The cargo ship was shelled and sunk in the Baltic Sea northwest of Liepāja, Latvia by S-7 (Soviet Navy).
Shoju Maru	Japan	World War II: The cargo ship was torpedoed and sunk in the Pacific Ocean off Marcus Island by USS Pike (United States Navy).
Spar	Netherlands	World War II: Convoy SC 94: The cargo ship was torpedoed and sunk in the Atlantic Ocean (53°05′N 43°38′W) by U-593 (Kriegsmarine) with the loss of three of her 39 crew. Survivors were rescued by HMS Nasturtium (Royal Navy) and HMCS Orillia (Royal Canadian Navy).

== 6 August ==
List of shipwrecks: 6 August 1942
Ship	State	Description
Ezzet	Egypt	World War II: The sailing ship as shelled and sunk in the Mediterranean Sea by U-77 (Kriegsmarine).
Mamutu	Australia	World War II: The inter-island transport was shelled and sunk in the Gulf of Papua 30 nautical miles (56 km) west of Bramble Bay (09°11′S 144°12′E) by Ro-33 (Imperial Japanese Navy). The submarine machine gunned survivors in the water. Eighty-two passengers, her master, and 31 of her crew were killed.
Nita	Italy	World War II: The cargo ship was torpedoed and sunk in the Mediterranean Sea (35°15′N 12°17′E) by British aircraft. She was refloated in 1954 and scrapped.
OVR-6	Soviet Navy	The minesweeping boat was lost on this date.
Ohio Maru	Imperial Japanese Army	World War II: The Daifuku Maru No. 1-class transport ship was torpedoed and sunk in the South China Sea (13°51′N 113°15′E) 250 miles (400 km) east north east of Camranh Bay, French Indochina by USS Tautog (United States Navy). Thirty-eight passengers, two guards and 72 of her crew were killed.
Palau Maru	Japan	World War II: The transport ship was torpedoed and sunk in the Pacific Ocean off Truk, South Seas Mandate by USS Greenling (United States Navy).
Rozewie	Poland	World War II: The coaster was torpedoed and sunk in the Atlantic Ocean (11°00′N 57°30′W) by U-66 (Kriegsmarine) with the loss of three of her eighteen crew.
HMS Thorn	Royal Navy	World War II: The T-class submarine was depth-charged and sunk in the Mediterranean Sea south west of Gavdos Island, Greece by Pegaso (Regia Marina) with the loss of all 61 crew.
U-210	Kriegsmarine	World War II: The Type VII submarine was rammed and sunk by HMCS Assiniboine (Royal Canadian Navy) with the loss of six of her 43 crew.
U-612	Kriegsmarine	The Type VIIC submarine collided with U-444 (Kriegsmarine) and sank in the Bay of Danzig off Gotenhafen with the loss of two of her 45 crew. She was raised, repaired and returned to service as a training boat in May 1943.
UJ 1211 Rau X	Kriegsmarine	World War II: The submarine chaser struck a mine and sank in the Baltic Sea off Espoo, Finland.
Vacarme	French Navy	The Clameur-class patrol tug (370 GRT) sank off the Chafarinas Islands after springing of a leak. Two sailors were lost with her.
Wawaloam	United States	World War II: The schooner was shelled and sunk in the Atlantic Ocean 460 nautical miles (850 km) south of Cape Race, Dominion of Newfoundland by U-86 (Kriegsmarine). All seven crew were rescued by Irish Rose (Ireland).

== 7 August ==
List of shipwrecks: 7 August 1942
Ship	State	Description
Arthur W. Sewall	Norway	World War II: The tanker was torpedoed, shelled and sunk in the Atlantic Ocean (8°27′N 34°21′W) by U-109 (Kriegsmarine). Her 36 crew were rescued by Athina Livanos ( Greece).
Breñas	Norway	World War II: The cargo ship was torpedoed, shelled and damaged in the Atlantic Ocean (8°38′N 53°45′W) by U-108 (Kriegsmarine). She later sank at 10°20′N 56°10′W with the loss of one of her 34 crew. Survivors were rescued by U-108 and landed at Trinidad, except for her captain, who was taken as a prisoner of war. Breñas was on a voyage from Ascension Island to Trinidad.
Delfshaven	Netherlands	World War II: The cargo ship was torpedoed and sunk in the Atlantic Ocean (7°24′N 25°37′W) by U-572 (Kriegsmarine) with the loss of one of her 39 crew.
Lise	Denmark	World War II: The cargo ship struck a mine and sank in the North Sea off Wangeroog, Germany.
Marigoula	Greece	World War II: The schooner was shelled and sunk in the Mediterranean Sea by HMS Proteus (Royal Navy).
HMS MTB 44	Royal Navy	World War II: The White 73'-class motor torpedo boat was sunk off Dover, Kent by Kriegsmarine surface vessels.
HMS MTB 237	Royal Navy	World War II: The Vosper 72'-class motor torpedo boat was sunk off Barfleur, Manche, France by Kriegsmarine surface vessels.
Shofuku Maru No.1	Imperial Japanese Navy	World War II: The net tender was torpedoed and sunk in the Pacific Ocean near Wotje Atoll, Marshall Islands by USS Tambor (United States Navy).
Sperrbrecher 170 Maria S. Müller	Kriegsmarine	World War II: The Sperrbrecher struck a mine and sank in the North Sea north west of Ostend, West Flanders, Belgium.
Wachtfels	Germany	World War II: The cargo ship was torpedoed and sunk in the Mediterranean Sea off Sicily, Italy (36°55′N 24°10′E) by HMS Proteus (Royal Navy).

== 8 August ==
List of shipwrecks: 8 August 1942
Ship	State	Description
Anneberg	United Kingdom	World War II: Convoy SC 94: The cargo ship was torpedoed and sunk in the Atlantic Ocean (56°30′N 32°14′W) by U-379 (Kriegsmarine). Her 38 crew were rescued by HMCS Battleford (Royal Canadian Navy), HMS Nasturtium and HMS Primrose (both Royal Navy).
Bifuku Maru	Japan	World War II: The cargo ship was torpedoed and sunk in the Pacific Ocean off the Kuril Islands by USS Narwhal (United States Navy).
Firesia	Greece	World War II: The schooner was shelled and sunk in the Mediterranean Sea by HMS Proteus (Royal Navy).
USS George F. Elliott	United States Navy	USS George F. Elliott World War II: The Heywood-class attack transport was hit by a Mitsubishi G4M aircraft in Ironbottom Sound, Solomon Islands. She was subsequently scuttled due to damage sustained.
Kaimoku	United States	World War II: Convoy SC 94: The cargo ship was torpedoed and sunk in the Atlantic Ocean (56°30′N 32°14′W) by U-379 (Kriegsmarine) with the loss of four of her 50 crew. Survivors were rescued by HMCS Battleford (Royal Canadian Navy).
Kelso	United Kingdom	World War II: Convoy SC 94: The cargo ship was torpedoed and sunk in the Atlantic Ocean south east of Cape Farewell, Greenland (56°30′N 32°14′W) by U-176 (Kriegsmarine) with the loss of three of her 44 crew. Survivors were rescued by HMCS Battleford (Royal Canadian Navy).
Kotoku Maru	Japan	World War II: The cargo ship was bombed and sunk in the South China Sea (7°01′N 147°07′E) by United States Army Air Force aircraft.
Meiyo Maru	Imperial Japanese Navy	World War II: The Shoan Maru-class auxiliary transport was torpedoed and sunk 14 nautical miles (26 km) west of Cape St. George, New Britain (04°50′S 152°40′E) by USS S-38 (United States Navy) with the loss of 373 lives.
Mount Kassion	Greece	World War II: Convoy SC 94: The cargo ship was torpedoed and sunk in the Atlantic Ocean south east of Cape Farewell (56°30′N 32°14′W) by U-176 (Kriegsmarine). Her 54 crew were rescued by HMS Primrose (Royal Navy).
Nikkei Maru	Japan	World War II: The cargo liner was torpedoed and sunk in the Kii Channel by USS Silversides (United States Navy).
Trehata	United Kingdom	World War II: Convoy SC 94: The cargo ship was torpedoed and sunk in the Atlantic Ocean south east of Cape Farewell (56°30′N 32°14′W) by U-176 (Kriegsmarine) with the loss of 31 of her 56 crew. Survivors were rescued by Inger Lise (Norway).
U-379	Kriegsmarine	World War II: The Type VIIC submarine was depth charged and sunk in the Atlantic Ocean south east of Cape Farewell (57°11′N 30°57′W) by HMS Dianthus (Royal Navy) with the loss of 40 of her 45 crew.

== 9 August ==
List of shipwrecks: 9 August 1942
Ship	State	Description
USS Astoria	United States Navy	World War II: Battle of Savo Island: The New Orleans-class cruiser was shelled and sunk in Ironbottom Sound, Solomon Islands by Imperial Japanese Navy cruisers. The wreck was located in February 2015.
HMAS Canberra	Royal Australian Navy	World War II: Battle of Savo Island: The County-class cruiser was shelled and severely damaged by Imperial Japanese Navy cruisers. She was scuttled by USS Ellet (United States Navy).
Dalhousie	United Kingdom	World War II: The cargo ship was captured in the South Atlantic Ocean south east of the Abrolhos Islands, Brazil (20°22′S 24°40′W) by Stier (Kriegsmarine). She was then scuttled by Stier with torpedoes. Her 37 crew were taken as prisoners of war.
USS Jarvis	United States Navy	World War II: The Bagley-class destroyerwas torpedoed and damaged by aircraft on 8 August, then bombed, torpedoed and sunk in the Solomon Sea 40 nautical miles (74 km) off Guadalcanal, Solomon Islands (09°42′S 158°59′E) on 9 August by Imperial Japanese Navy aircraft with the loss of all 233 crew.
HMS ML 301	Royal Navy	World War II: The Fairmile B motor launch was sunk by an explosion at Freetown, Sierra Leone.
RFA Malmanger	Royal Fleet Auxiliary	World War II: The tanker was torpedoed and sunk in the Atlantic Ocean (7°13′N 26°30′W) by U-130 (Kriegsmarine) with the loss of two of her 34 crew. Two survivors were taken aboard U-130 as prisoners of war, the rest reached land in their lifeboats.
Mendanau	Netherlands	World War II: The cargo ship was torpedoed and sunk in the Atlantic Ocean 400 nautical miles (740 km) south west of Freetown (4°45′N 18°00′W) by U-752 (Kriegsmarine) with the loss of 69 of her 85 crew. Three survivors were taken aboard U-752 as prisoners of war.
USS Quincy	United States Navy	World War II: Battle of Savo Island: The New Orleans-class cruiser was shelled and sunk in Ironbottom Sound off Guadalcanal by Imperial Japanese Navy cruisers with the loss of 370 of her 807 crew.
Radchurch	United Kingdom	World War II: Convoy SC 94: The cargo ship was torpedoed and sunk in the Atlantic Ocean south east of Cape Farewell, Greenland (56°15′N 32°00′W) by U-176 (Kriegsmarine) with the loss of two of her 42 crew. Survivors were rescued by HMCS Battleford (Royal Canadian Navy).
San Emiliano	United Kingdom	World War II: The tanker was torpedoed and sunk in the Atlantic Ocean 450 nautical miles (830 km) west of Trinidad (7°22′N 54°08′W) by U-155 (Kriegsmarine) with the loss of 40 of her 48 crew. Survivors were rescued by a United States Army ship.
Sigyn	Sweden	World War II: The cargo ship struck a mine and sank in the North Sea off Den Helder, North Holland, Netherlands (52°55′N 4°34′W). Her crew survived.
Stenso	Soviet Union	The cargo ship was wrecked in Lake Ladoga. There were no casualties.
V 5103 Taifun	Kriegsmarine	The naval trawler/Vorpostenboot collided with Fjæra (Norway) and sank.
USS Vincennes	United States Navy	World War II: Battle of Savo Island: The New Orleans-class cruiser was shelled, torpedoed and sunk in Ironbottom Sound off Guadalcanal by Imperial Japanese Navy cruisers with the loss of 332 of her 952 crew.

== 10 August ==
List of shipwrecks: 10 August 1942
Ship	State	Description
Cape Race	United Kingdom	World War II: Convoy SC 94: The cargo ship was torpedoed and sunk in the Atlantic Ocean (56°45′N 22°50′W) by U-660 (Kriegsmarine). All 63 people aboard were rescued by HMS Dianthus and HMS Nasturtium (both Royal Navy).
Condylis	Greece	World War II: Convoy SC 94: The cargo ship was torpedoed and sunk in the Atlantic Ocean (57°00′N 22°30′W) by U-438 and U-660 (both Kriegsmarine) with the loss of nine of her 36 crew.
Dnestr	Soviet Navy	World War II: The auxiliary gunboat was sunk in the Azov Sea at Temryuk by Luftwaffe aircraft.
Empire Birch	United Kingdom	World War II: The tug struck a mine in the Indian Ocean 150 nautical miles (280 km; 170 mi) north of Lourenço Marques, Portuguese East Africa (24°45′S 34°47′E) and was beached and abandoned. She then slid off the beach and sank in deep water.
Empire Reindeer	United Kingdom	World War II: Convoy SC 94: The Design 1037 ship was torpedoed and sunk in the Atlantic Ocean (57°00′N 22°30′W) by U-660 (Kriegsmarine). Her 65 crew were rescued by HMS Dianthus and HMS Nasturtium (both Royal Navy).
F 133	Kriegsmarine	World War II: The Type A Marinefährprahm was sunk in the Sea of Azov off Yeisk, Soviet Union. (other sources say she was surrendered in 1944).
Fukuei Maru No. 15	Imperial Japanese Navy	World War II: The Fukuei Maru No. 10-class auxiliary netlayer was bombed and sunk by Lockheed Hudson bomber aircraft of 13 Squadron, Royal Australian Air Force off Beco, Portuguese Timor.
Kako	Imperial Japanese Navy	World War II: The Furutaka-class cruiser was torpedoed and sunk in the Pacific Ocean off Simbari Island, New Ireland (02°28′S 152°11′E) by USS S-44 (United States Navy) while returning to base from the Battle of Savo Island, with the loss of 68 crew. Her captain and 649 crew were rescued by Aoba, Furutaka, and Kinugasa (all Imperial Japanese Navy).
Kharouf	Palestine	World War II: The sailing ship was shelled and sunk in the Mediterranean Sea by U-77 (Kriegsmarine). Her crew survived.
Medon	United Kingdom	World War II: The cargo ship was torpedoed and sunk in the Atlantic Ocean off Pará, Brazil (9°26′N 38°28′W) by Reginaldo Giuliani (Regia Marina). Her 64 crew survived. Sixteen survivors were rescued by Reedpool (United Kingdom).
Oregon	United Kingdom	World War II: Convoy SC 94: The cargo ship straggled behind the convoy. She was torpedoed and damaged by U-660 (Kriegsmarine) with the loss of two of her 42 crew. Survivors abandoned ship and were rescued by HMS Dianthus and HMS Nasturtium (both Royal Navy). Oregon was later torpedoed and sunk by U-438 (Kriegsmarine).
Scire	Regia Marina	World War II: The Adua-class submarine was sunk in the Mediterranean Sea 5 miles (8.0 km) off Haifa, Palestine (33°00′N 34°00′E) by HMS Islay (Royal Navy).
Sevastopol	Soviet Union	World War II: The cargo liner was torpedoed and sunk in the Black Sea off Tuapse by S 102 (Kriegsmarine) with the loss of 924 of her 1,054 passengers and crew.
Strabo	Netherlands	World War II: The coaster was shelled and sunk in the Atlantic Ocean 250 nautical miles (460 km) east of Georgetown, Saint Vincent (7°29′N 54°05′W) by U-155 (Kriegsmarine). Her thirteen crew survived.
Vivian P. Smith	United Kingdom	World War II: The schooner was shelled and sunk in the Atlantic Ocean 140 nautical miles (260 km; 160 mi) east of the Turks and Caicos Islands (21°50′N 68°40′W) by U-600 (Kriegsmarine). Her 11 crew survived.
Unnamed	Luftwaffe	World War II: The Siebel ferry (possibly SF 119 or SF 123) was mined in the Sea of Azov off Jeisk, Soviet Union.

== 11 August ==
List of shipwrecks: 11 August 1942
Ship	State	Description
HMS Eagle	Royal Navy	HMS Eagle World War II: Operation Pedestal: The aircraft carrier was torpedoed and sunk in the Mediterranean Sea 72 nautical miles (133 km) south of Cape Salinas, Mallorca, Spain (38°03′00″N 3°1′12″E) by U-73 (Kriegsmarine) with the loss of 131 of her 791 crew.
Empire Hope	United Kingdom	World War II: Convoy WS 21: The refrigerated cargo liner was bombed and damaged in the Mediterranean Sea off Galeta Island, Algeria by Heinkel He 111 and Junkers Ju 88 aircraft of the Luftwaffe. Her crew abandoned the burning ship and were rescued by HMS Penn (Royal Navy). Empire Hope was torpedoed and further damaged the next day by Bronzo (Regia Marina). She was declared a hazard to shipping and was scuttled by HMS Bramham (Royal Navy).
Kuban	Soviet Union	World War II: The cargo ship was sunk in a Luftwaffe air raid on Novorossiysk.
Marie Jo	United States	The fishing vessel sank in Mill Bay on the south-central coast of the Territory of Alaska (57°49′30″N 152°20′30″W).
RFA Mirlo	Royal Fleet Auxiliary	World War II: The tanker was torpedoed and sunk in the Atlantic Ocean 870 nautical miles (1,610 km) off Freetown, Sierra Leone (6°04′N 25°53′W) by U-130 (Kriegsmarine). Her 36 crew were rescued by HMS Banff, HMS Boreas and HMT Canna (all Royal Navy).
Vimeira	United Kingdom	World War II: The tanker was torpedoed and sunk in the Atlantic Ocean 450 nautical miles (830 km) south west of the Cape Verde Islands, Portugal (10°03′N 28°55′W) by U-109 (Kriegsmarine) with the loss of seven of her 44 crew. Her captain was taken aboard U-109 as a prisoner of war. Other survivors were rescued by HMS Crocus (Royal Navy) Siranger (Norway) and Sylvia de Larrinaga (United Kingdom).

== 12 August ==
List of shipwrecks: 12 August 1942
Ship	State	Description
Anapa	Soviet Union	World War II: The tug was sunk in the Kerch Strait by Luftwaffe aircraft.
Boltenhagen	Germany	World War II: The cargo ship was torpedoed and sunk in Flekkefjord (59°08′N 6°25′E) by HMS Sturgeon (Royal Navy).
Brisbane Star	United Kingdom	World War II: Operation Pedestal: The cargo ship was torpedoed and damaged in the Mediterranean Sea by the Dessiè (Regia Marina).
HMS Cairo	Royal Navy	World War II: Operation Pedestal: The C-class cruiser was torpedoed and sunk in the Mediterranean Sea off Bizerta, Algeria by Axum (Regia Marina) with the loss of 24 of her crew.
Cobalto	Regia Marina	World War II: Operation Pedestal: The Acciaio-class submarine was depth charged by HMS Ithuriel and HMS Pathfinder (both Royal Navy), then rammed and sunk in the Mediterranean Sea (37°39′N 10°00′E) by HMS Ithuriel.
Dagabur	Regia Marina	World War II: Operation Pedestal: The Adua-class submarine was rammed and sunk in the Mediterranean Sea (37°18′N 1°58′E) off Algiers, Algeria by HMS Wolverine (Royal Navy).
Deucalion	United Kingdom	World War II: Operation Pedestal: The cargo ship was bombed and damaged in the Mediterranean Sea by Luftwaffe aircraft, and then torpedoed by another enemy aircraft, 5 nautical miles (9.3 km) west of the Cani Rocks, with the loss of one of the 153 people aboard. HMS Bramham (Royal Navy) rescued survivors and scuttled the ship.
HMS Foresight	Royal Navy	World War II: Operation Pedestal: The F-class destroyer was torpedoed and damaged in the Mediterranean Sea (37°40′N 10°00′W) by a Savoia-Marchetti SM.79 aircraft of 132 Gruppo, Regia Aeronautica. She was scuttled by HMS Tartar (Royal Navy) on 13 August.
Georg L. M. Russ	Germany	World War II: The cargo ship was torpedoed and sunk in Norwegian waters (58°42′N 5°27′E) by HMS Unshaken (Royal Navy).
HMS Kenya	Royal Navy	World War II: Operation Pedestal: The Fiji-class cruiser was torpedoed and damaged in the Mediterranean Sea by Dessiè (Regia Marina). She was then torpedoed and damaged by the submarine Alagi (Regia Marina).
Manzanillo	Cuba	World War II: Special Convoy 12: The cargo ship was torpedoed and sunk in the Gulf of Mexico south of Key West, Florida, United States (24°20′N 81°50′W) in 10 fathoms (60 ft; 18 m) of water by U-508 (Kriegsmarine) with the loss of 23 of her crew.
Ogaden	Italy	World War II: The cargo ship was torpedoed and sunk in the Mediterranean Sea 9 nautical miles (17 km) off the Ras El Tin Palace, Egypt by HMS Porpoise (Royal Navy) with the loss of three lives. There were about 200 survivors. Ogaden was on a voyage from Benghazi to Tobruk, Libya.
Ohio	United Kingdom	World War II: Operation Pedestal: The tanker was torpedoed and damaged by Axum (Regia Marina), further damaged by many near misses, plus hit by a crashing Junkers Ju 87 aircraft of the Luftwaffe, and had a Junkers Ju 88 aircraft skip off the water and onto the deck, plus at least one bomb hit. She was towed into Grand Harbour, Malta on 15 August where her cargo was unloaded. She then split in two and sank in shallow water. Used for storage and as a barracks. Ohio was refloated and scuttled ten miles (16 km) offshore on 19 September 1946.
Santiago de Cuba	Cuba	World War II: Special Convoy 12: The cargo ship was torpedoed and sunk in the Gulf of Mexico south of Key West (24°20′N 81°50′W) by U-508 (Kriegsmarine) with the loss of ten of her 29 crew.

== 13 August ==
List of shipwrecks: 13 August 1942
Ship	State	Description
Almeria Lykes	United States	World War II: Operation Pedestal: The cargo ship was bombed and damaged by Luftwaffe aircraft and later torpedoed and sunk in the Mediterranean Sea off Cape Bon, Tunisia (36°40′N 11°35′E) by S 30, S 36 (both Kriegsmarine), MAS 554 and MAS 557 (both Regia Marina). Her 94 crew were rescued by HMS Eskimo and HMS Somali (Royal Navy).
Bolzano	Regia Marina	World War II: The Trento-class cruiser was torpedoed and damaged in the Mediterranean Sea by HMS Unbroken (Royal Navy). She was beached on Panarea. She was refloated in September and towed to Naples.
California	United States	World War II: The cargo ship was torpedoed, shelled and sunk in the Atlantic Ocean (9°24′N 33°02′W) by Reginaldo Giuliani (Regia Marina) with the loss of one of her 36 crew.
Clan Ferguson	United Kingdom	World War II: Operation Pedestal: The cargo ship was torpedoed and severely damaged in the Mediterranean Sea 20 nautical miles (37 km) north of Zembra, Tunisia by Junkers Ju 88 aircraft of the Luftwaffe. She was then torpedoed and sunk by Alagi (Regia Marina) with the loss of 32 of the 85 people aboard.
Cripple Creek	United States	World War II: The cargo ship was torpedoed and sunk in the Atlantic Ocean 400 nautical miles (740 km) off Sierra Leone (4°55′N 18°30′W) by U-752 (Kriegsmarine) with the loss of one of her 52 crew. Survivors were rescued by HMS St. Winstan (Royal Navy) on 16 August.
Delmundo	United States	World War II: Convoy TAW 12: The Design 1022 ship was torpedoed and sunk in the Atlantic Ocean 18 nautical miles (33 km) south of Cape Maysi, Cuba (19°55′N 73°49′W) by U-600 (Kriegsmarine) with the loss of three passengers and five of her 41 crew. Survivors were rescued by HMS Churchill (Royal Navy).
Dorset	United Kingdom	World War II: Operation Pedestal: The cargo ship was bombed and sunk in the Mediterranean Sea 25 nautical miles (46 km) north west of Linosa, Italy (36°12′N 12°49′E) by Heinkel He 111, Junkers Ju-87 and Junkers Ju-88 aircraft of the Luftwaffe and Savoia-Marchetti S.79 aircraft of the Regia Aeronautica. All 101 people aboard survived.
Everelza	Latvia	World War II: Convoy TAW 12: The cargo ship was torpedoed and sunk in the Atlantic Ocean 18 nautical miles (33 km) south of Cape Maysi (19°55′N 73°49′W) by U-600 (Kriegsmarine) with the loss of 23 of her 37 crew. Survivors were rescued by the convoy's escorts. More: Latvian Mercantile Marine during World War II
Glenorchy	United Kingdom	World War II: Operation Pedestal: The cargo ship torpedoed and damaged by Junkers Ju-88 aircraft of the Luftwaffe. She was subsequently sunk in the Mediterranean Sea north west of the Kelibia Lighthouse, Algeria by MS-31 (Regia Marina) with the loss of nine of her seventeen crew. Survivors were taken as prisoners of war.
HMS Manchester	Royal Navy	World War II: Operation Pedestal: The Town-class cruiser was torpedoed and disabled by MS boats MS-16 and MS-22 (both Regia Marina) and then scuttled in the Mediterranean Sea off Cape Bon, 4 miles (6.4 km) east of Kelibia, Tunisia (36°50′N 11°10′E).
Medea	Netherlands	World War II: Convoy WAT 13: The cargo ship was torpedoed and sunk in the Caribbean Sea (19°54′N 74°16′W) by U-658 (Kriegsmarine) with the loss of five of her 28 crew. Survivors were rescued by a United States Navy vessel.
R. M. Parker Jr.	United States	World War II: The tanker was torpedoed and sunk in the Gulf of Mexico 25 nautical miles (46 km) south of Isles Dernieres, Louisiana (28°50′N 90°42′W) by U-170 (Kriegsmarine). Her 44 crew were rescued by USC&GS Pioneer (United States).
Rochester Castle	United Kingdom	World War II: Operation Pedestal: The refrigerated cargo ship was torpedoed and damaged by Regia Marina motor torpedo boats. She was further damaged by Heinkel He-111, Junkers Ju-87 and Junkers Ju-88 aircraft of the Luftwaffe and Savoia-Marchetti S.79 aircraft of the Regia Aeronautica.
Santa Elisa	United States	World War II: Operation Pedestal: The cargo ship was torpedoed and sunk in the Mediterranean Sea 20 nautical miles (37 km) off Cape Bon (36°48′N 11°23′E by MAS 564 (Regia Marina). Four Royal Army gunners were killed.
Waimarama	United Kingdom	Waimarama World War II: Operation Pedestal: The cargo ship was bombed and sunk in the Mediterranean Sea (35°25′N 12°00′E) by Junkers Ju 88 aircraft of the Luftwaffe with the loss of 93 of the 95 people aboard.
Wairangi	United Kingdom	World War II: Operation Pedestal: The cable ship was sunk in the Mediterranean Sea (36°34′N 11°15′E) by S-36 and S-30 (both Kriegsmarine) and MAS 554 and MAS 557 (both Regia Marina). Survivors were rescued by HMS Eskimo and HMS Somali (both Royal Navy).

== 14 August ==
List of shipwrecks: 14 August 1942
Ship	State	Description
Arabistan	United Kingdom	World War II: The ocean liner was shelled and sunk in the Atlantic Ocean 500 miles (800 km) east of Aracaju, Brazil (11°30′S 26°00′W) by Michel (Kriegsmarine) with the loss of 65 of her 67 crew. Survivors were made prisoners of war and eventually turned over to the Japanese.
Empire Corporal	United Kingdom	World War II: Convoy TAW 12J: The tanker was torpedoed and sunk in the Caribbean Sea (21°45′N 76°10′W) U-598 (Kriegsmarine) with the loss of six of her 55 crew. Survivors were rescued by USS PT-498 (United States Navy).
Hachigen Maru	Japan	World War II: The cargo ship was torpedoed and sunk in the Celebes Sea by USS Seawolf (United States Navy).
Michael Jebsen	United Kingdom	World War II: Convoy TAW 12J: The cargo ship was torpedoed and sunk in the Caribbean Sea north west of Barlovento Point, Cuba (21°45′N 76°10′W) by U-598 (Kriegsmarine) with the loss of seven of her 47 crew. Survivors were rescued by a United States Navy patrol boat.
USS S-39	United States Navy	The S-class submarine ran aground on a reef in the Coral Sea south of Rossel Island, Louisiade Archipelago. Her crew were rescued by Katoomba (Royal Australian Navy) on 16 August.
Sylvia de Larrinaga	United Kingdom	World War II: The cargo ship was torpedoed and sunk in the Atlantic Ocean (10°49′N 33°35′W) by Reginaldo Giuliani (Regia Marina) with the loss of three of her 53 crew.
V 1807 Wagram	Kriegsmarine	The naval trawler/Vorpostenboot struck a mine and sank.

== 15 August ==
List of shipwrecks: 15 August 1942
Ship	State	Description
Balladier	United States	World War II: Convoy SC 95: The cargo ship was torpedoed and sunk in the Atlantic Ocean 550 nautical miles (1,020 km) south east of Iceland (55°23′N 24°32′W) by U-705 (Kriegsmarine) with the loss of thirteen of her 45 crew. Survivors were rescued by Norluna (United States).
Chervona Ukraina	Soviet Union	World War II: The cargo ship was sunk at Sukham by Luftwaffe aircraft. Two of her crew killed.
Lerici	Italy	World War II: The cargo ship was torpedoed in the Mediterranean Sea 120 miles (190 km) north of Ras Amir, Libya (34°35′N 21°32′E) by HMS Porpoise (Royal Navy). She sank the next day.
M 97	Soviet Navy	World War II: The M-class submarine was depth charged and sunk in the Gulf of Finland (59°50′N 24°30′E) by VMV 5 (Finnish Navy).
R-89	Kriegsmarine	World War II: The Type R-41 minesweeper was sunk off Ålesund, Norway by British aircraft.
R-106	Kriegsmarine	World War II: The Type R-41 minesweeper was sunk in the Gulf of Finland by Soviet Ilyushin Il-4 aircraft.
Rekord	Soviet Union	World War II: The tug (100 GRT) was sunk at Sukhumi by Luftwaffe aircraft. Five of her crew were killed.
S-1	(Independent State of Croatia) Croatian Navy	World War II: The auxiliary minesweeper was mined in the Sea of Azov off Yeisk, Soviet Union.
Shturman	Soviet Union	World War II: The cargo liner was sunk at Temryuk by Luftwaffe aircraft.
No. 210	Soviet Navy	The MO-4-class submarine chaser was sunk on this date.

== 16 August ==
List of shipwrecks: 16 August 1942
Ship	State	Description
Annibal Benévolo	Brazil	World War II: The cargo liner was sunk by torpedo in the Atlantic Ocean 15 nautical miles (28 km) off the mouth of the Real River (11°41′S 37°21′W) by U-507 (Kriegsmarine) with the loss of 150 of the 154 people aboard.
Araraquara	Brazil	World War II: The refrigerated cargo liner was sunk by torpedo in the Atlantic Ocean 20 nautical miles (37 km) off the mouth of the Real River (12°00′S 37°19′W) by U-507 (Kriegsmarine) with the loss of 131 of the 142 people aboard.
Baependy	Brazil	World War II: The troopship was sunk by torpedo 20 nautical miles (37 km) off Aracaju (11°50′S 37°00′W) by U-507 (Kriegsmarine) with the loss of 270 of the 306 people aboard.
Daniel	Palestine	World War II: The sailing ship was shelled and sunk in the Mediterranean Sea by U-77 (Kriegsmarine). Her crew survived.
Helen	Finland	World War II: The cargo ship struck a mine and sank in the Baltic Sea north east of Rügen, Germany.
R 184	Kriegsmarine	World War II: The Type R-151 minesweeper was rammed and sunk in the English Channel off Calais, France by HMMGB 330 (Royal Navy). At least five sailors were killed. Twenty-five survivors were captured by the British.
Sperrbrecher 60 Elster	Kriegsmarine	World War II: The Sperrbrecher struck a mine and sank in the North Sea off Den Helder, North Holland, Netherlands.
Suecia	Sweden	World War II: Convoy SC 95: The cargo ship straggled behind the convoy. She was torpedoed and sunk in the Atlantic Ocean (55°43′N 25°58′W) by U-596 (Kriegsmarine) with the loss of nine of her 38 crew.
Unnamed	Luftwaffe	The Siebel ferry (possibly SF 119 or SF 123) was lost in the Sea of Azov off Mariupo, Soviet Union.

== 17 August ==
List of shipwrecks: 17 August 1942
Ship	State	Description
Arará	Brazil	World War II: The cargo ship was torpedoed and sunk in the Atlantic Ocean nine nautical miles (17 km; 10 mi) off the São Paulo Lighthouse, Bahia (13°20′S 38°49′W) by U-507 (Kriegsmarine) with the loss of 20 of her 36 crew.
Ausonia	Italy	World War II: The schooner was shelled and sunk in the Mediterranean Sea off Orosei, Sardinia by HMS Safari (Royal Navy).
Eifuku Maru No. 3 GO	Imperial Japanese Navy	World War II: Raid on Makin Island: The auxiliary guard ship was lost on this date. USS Nautilus (United States Navy) shelled and sank a landing barge and a small patrol vessel with her 6-inch deck gun. This is the only Japanese warship lost on this date.
Fort La Reine	United Kingdom	World War II: Convoy PG 6: The Fort ship, on her maiden voyage, was torpedoed and sunk in the Windward Passage west of Haiti (18°08′N 75°20′W) by U-658 (Kriegsmarine) with the loss of three of her 44 crew. Survivors were rescued by HMS Pimpernel (Royal Navy) and a United States Navy patrol boat.
Itagiba	Brazil	World War II: The cargo liner was torpedoed and sunk in the Atlantic Ocean 9 nautical miles (17 km) off the São Paulo Lighthouse (13°20′S 38°40′W) by U-507 (Kriegsmarine) with the loss of 36 of the 181 people aboard.
Jericho	United States	The fishing vessel was destroyed by fire 1/2 nautical mile (930 m) west of the entrance to Hawk Inlet (58°05′30″N 134°46′30″W) in the Alaska Territory.
Komiles, Komsomolets, P-4 and Sh-500	Soviet Union	World War II: The tugs Komiles and Komsomolets and the barges P-4 and Sh-500 were sunk in the Pechora Sea off Matveev Island (69°30′N 58°32′E) by U-209 (Kriegsmarine). There were 305 dead from those aboard the four vessels and only 23 survivors, who were rescued by Nord (Soviet Union) and T-54 and T-62 (both Soviet Navy). Komsomolets, which sank in shallow waters, was later salvaged and returned to service.
Laguna	United Kingdom	World War II: Convoy PG 6: The cargo ship was torpedoed and damaged west of Anse-d'Hainault, Haiti by U-658 (Kriegsmarine). Laguna put in to a port. She was subsequently repaired and returned to service.
Louisiana	United States	World War II: The tanker was torpedoed and sunk in the Atlantic Ocean approximately 300 nautical miles (560 km) north east of Cayenne, French Guiana by U-108 (Kriegsmarine) with the loss of all 41 crew and eight gunners.
Nino Bixio	Italy	World War II: The cargo ship, carrying about 3,200 British prisoners of war, was torpedoed by the submarine HMS Turbulent (Royal Navy) in the Mediterranean Sea off Greece. She was towed to Pylos Greece, and beached. She later was towed to Venice and sunk there as a blockship.
Princess Marguerite	Canada	World War II: The troopship was torpedoed and sunk in the Mediterranean Sea north west of Port Said, Egypt (32°03′N 32°47′E) by U-83 (Kriegsmarine) with the loss of 49 of the 1,123 people aboard. Survivors were rescued by HMS Hero and HMS Kelvin (both Royal Navy).
Samir	Egypt	World War II: Convoy PG 6: The cargo ship was torpedoed and sunk in the Windward Passage west of Haiti (18°30′N 75°20′W) by U-658 (Kriegsmarine).
Triton	Norway	World War II: Convoy SL 118: The cargo ship was torpedoed and sunk in the Atlantic Ocean north east of the Azores, Portugal (39°31′N 22°43′W) by U-566 (Kriegsmarine). All 44 people aboard were rescued by Baron Dunmore (United Kingdom).
Wuri	Germany	World War II: The cargo ship struck a mine, broke in two, and sank in the Kattegat off Aalborg, Denmark (56°53′30″N 10°31′42″E) with the loss of 65 lives. The stern section was refloated in 1943 and taken to Copenhagen, where it was subsequently sunk by saboteurs. It was salvaged post-war, repaired and entered Swedish service in 1946 as Madame Butterfly.

== 18 August ==
List of shipwrecks: 18 August 1942
Ship	State	Description
Balingkar	Netherlands	World War II: Convoy SL 118: The cargo ship was torpedoed and sunk in the Atlantic Ocean (41°34′N 19°49′W) by U-214 (Kriegsmarine) with the loss of two of her 93 crew.
Blankaholm	Sweden	World War II: Convoy TAW 3: The cargo ship was torpedoed and sunk in the Caribbean Sea 95 nautical miles (176 km) west of Guantánamo Bay, Cuba (19°41′N 76°50′W) by U-553 (Kriegsmarine) with the loss of five of her 28 crew.
C. F. Liljevalch	Sweden	World War II: The ore carrier was torpedoed and sunk in the Baltic Sea off Västervik by L 3 (Soviet Navy). There were 33 dead and 7 survivors.
Empire Bede	United Kingdom	World War II: Convoy TAW 13: The cargo ship was torpedoed and damaged in the Caribbean Sea (19°41′N 76°50′W) by U-553 (Kriegsmarine) with the loss of two of her 45 crew. She was scuttled by gunfire from HMS Pimpernel (Royal Navy).
V 406 Hans Loh	Kriegsmarine	World War II: The Vorpostenboot struck a submarine-laid mine and sank in the Bay of Biscay, west of Lacanau, Gironde, France (45°02′N 1°33′W).
Hatarana	United Kingdom	World War II: Convoy SL 118: The cargo ship was torpedoed and damaged in the Atlantic Ocean (41°07′N 20°32′W) by U-214 (Kriegsmarine). Her 108 crew were rescued by Corabella (United Kingdom) and HMS Pentstemon (Royal Navy), which scuttled Hatarana.
John Hancock	United States	World War II: Convoy TAW 13: The Liberty ship was torpedoed and sunk in the Caribbean Sea 95 nautical miles (176 km) west of Guantánamo Bay (19°41′N 76°50′W) by U-553 (Kriegsmarine). Her 49 crew were rescued by a Royal Navy corvette.
HMS MTB 43	Royal Navy	World War II: The White 73'-class motor torpedo boat was shelled and sunk by Kriegsmarine surface craft off Gravelines, Nord, France.
HMS MTB 218	Royal Navy	World War II: The Vosper 70'-class motor torpedo boat struck a mine and sank in the Strait of Dover.
Perseo	Italy	World War II: The cargo ship was torpedoed and sunk in the Mediterranean Sea off Cape Carbonara, 15 nautical miles (28 km) south of Serpentara, Sardinia by HMS Safari (Royal Navy).
Rosolino Pilo	Italy	World War II: The cargo ship was torpedoed and sunk in the Mediterranean Sea 50 nautical miles (93 km) south of Pantellaria by HMS United (Royal Navy).
Shch-138	Soviet Navy	The Shchuka-class submarine sank in the Amur. She was refloated in July 1943.

== 19 August ==
List of shipwrecks: 19 August 1942
Ship	State	Description
HMS Berkeley	Royal Navy	World War II: Dieppe Raid: The Hunt-class destroyer was bombed by a Focke-Wulf Fw 190 aircraft of 10 Staffeln, Jagdgeschwader 2, Luftwaffe, then torpedoed and sunk in the English Channel off Dieppe, Seine-Inférieure, France by HMS Albrighton (Royal Navy), with the loss of 15 of her 146 crew and an unknown number of embarked Canadian soldiers.
British Consul	United Kingdom	World War II: Convoy TAW (S): The tanker was torpedoed and sunk in the Caribbean Sea off Port of Spain, Trinidad, (11°58′N 62°38′W) by U-564 (Kriegsmarine) with the loss of two of the 42 people aboard. Survivors were rescued by HMS Clarkia (Royal Navy).
City of Manila	United Kingdom	World War II: Convoy SL 118: The cargo ship was torpedoed and damaged in the Atlantic Ocean west of Cape Finisterre, Spain, (43°21′N 18°20′W) by U-406 (Kriegsmarine) with the loss of one of her 96 crew. Survivors abandoned ship, but some of them later reboarded her. City of Manila later broke in two and sank. All 95 survivors were rescued by Empire Voice (United Kingdom) and the Naval trawler HMT Gorleston (Royal Navy).
Cressington Court	United Kingdom	World War II: The cargo ship was torpedoed and sunk in the Atlantic Ocean north east of Belém, Brazil, (7°58′N 46°00′W) by U-510 (Kriegsmarine) with the loss of eight of her 44 crew. Survivors were rescued by Woensdrecht (Netherlands).
Empire Cloud	United Kingdom	World War II: Convoy TAW (S): The cargo ship was torpedoed and damaged in the Caribbean Sea northeast of Trinidad by U-564 (Kriegsmarine) with the loss of three of her 54 crew. She sank at 10°54′N 62°10′W on 21 August while under tow.
UJ-1404 Franken	Kriegsmarine	World War II: Dieppe Raid: Convoy 2437: The auxiliary submarine chaser was severely damaged by gunfire by LCF(L)s and rammed by the motor gunboat HMS MGB 338 (Royal Navy) off Dieppe and was abandoned. The blazing wreck was shelled and sunk by HMS Brocklesby (Royal Navy) (49°56′N 1°4′E). HMS Brocklesby rescued 25 of her crew. There were nineteen dead.
Franz	Kriegsmarine	World War II: Dieppe Raid: Convoy 2437: The armed tanker was severely damaged by gunfire from HMS ML 346 (Royal Navy) off Dieppe and was beached.
Jacyra	Brazil	World War II: The barque was stopped in the South Atlantic off Itacaré (14°30′S 38°40′W) by German submarine U-507 (Kriegsmarine) and sunk by explosive charges after her six crew had been ordered into a lifeboat.
Juneta	United States	The fishing vessel was lost after colliding with the motor vessel Rolph (United States) in Blank Inlet (55°16′N 131°09′W) in the Alaska Territory.
HMS LCA 37	Royal Navy	World War II: Dieppe Raid: The landing craft assault was lost at Dieppe.
HMS LCA 52	Royal Navy	World War II: Dieppe Raid: The landing craft assault was lost at Dieppe.
HMS LCA 92	Royal Navy	World War II: Dieppe Raid: The landing craft assault was lost at Dieppe.
HMS LCA 94	Royal Navy	World War II: Dieppe Raid: The landing craft assault was lost at Dieppe.
HMS LCA 97	Royal Navy	World War II: Dieppe Raid: The landing craft assault was lost at Dieppe.
HMS LCA 102	Royal Navy	World War II: Dieppe Raid: The landing craft assault was lost at Dieppe.
HMS LCA 192	Royal Navy	World War II: Dieppe Raid: The landing craft assault was lost at Dieppe.
HMS LCA 209	Royal Navy	World War II: Dieppe Raid: The landing craft assault was lost at Dieppe.
HMS LCA 214	Royal Navy	World War II: Dieppe Raid: The landing craft assault was lost at Dieppe.
HMS LCA 215	Royal Navy	World War II: Dieppe Raid: The landing craft assault was lost at Dieppe.
HMS LCA 237	Royal Navy	World War II: Dieppe Raid: The landing craft assault was lost at Dieppe.
HMS LCA 247	Royal Navy	World War II: Dieppe Raid: The landing craft assault was lost at Dieppe.
HMS LCA 251	Royal Navy	World War II: Dieppe Raid: The landing craft assault was lost at Dieppe.
HMS LCA 284	Royal Navy	World War II: Dieppe Raid: The landing craft assault was lost at Dieppe.
HMS LCA 314	Royal Navy	World War II: Dieppe Raid: The landing craft assault was lost at Dieppe.
HMS LCA 317	Royal Navy	World War II: Dieppe Raid: The landing craft assault was lost at Dieppe.
HMS LCM 56	Royal Navy	The landing craft mechanized was lost.
HMS LCS(M) 9,	Royal Navy	World War II: Dieppe Raid: The landing craft support (mortar) was lost at Dieppe.
HMS LCF(L) 2	Royal Navy	World War II: Dieppe Raid: The anti-aircraft fire support LCT 2-class landing craft tank was wrecked at Dieppe.
HMS LCP(L) 81	Royal Navy	World War II: Dieppe Raid: The Landing Craft, Personnel (Large) was lost at Dieppe.
HMS LCP(L) 157	Royal Navy	World War II: Dieppe Raid: The Landing Craft, Personnel (Large) was lost at Dieppe.
HMS LCP(L) 164	Royal Navy	World War II: Dieppe Raid: The Landing Craft, Personnel (Large) was lost at Dieppe.
HMS LCP(L) 174	Royal Navy	World War II: Dieppe Raid: The Landing Craft, Personnel (Large) was lost at Dieppe.
HMS LCP(L) 210	Royal Navy	World War II: Dieppe Raid: The Landing Craft, Personnel (Large) was lost at Dieppe.
HMS LCP(L) 212	Royal Navy	World War II: Dieppe Raid: The Landing Craft, Personnel (Large) was lost at Dieppe.
HMS LCT 121	Royal Navy	World War II: Dieppe Raid: The LCT 2-class landing craft tank was wrecked and abandoned at Dieppe.
HMS LCT 124	Royal Navy	World War II: Dieppe Raid: The LCT 2-class landing craft tank was wrecked and abandoned at Dieppe. Either LCT 124 or LCT 145 (see below) was salvaged and put into German service as Dieppe.
HMS LCT 126	Royal Navy	World War II: Dieppe Raid: The LCT 2-class landing craft tank was wrecked and abandoned at Dieppe.
HMS LCT 145	Royal Navy	World War II: Dieppe Raid: The LCT 2-class landing craft tank was wrecked and abandoned at Dieppe. Either LCT 124 (see above) or LCT 145 was salvaged and put into German service as Dieppe.
HMS LCT 159	Royal Navy	World War II: Dieppe Raid: The LCT 2-class landing craft tank was sunk at Dieppe.
No. 574	Soviet Navy	World War II: The minesweeper was sunk in the Black Sea by R-36, R-37, and R-166 (all Kriegsmarine).
No. 578	Soviet Navy	World War II: The minesweeper was sunk in the Black Sea by R-36, R-37, and R-166 (all Kriegsmarine).
Sea Gull D.	United Kingdom	World War II: The sailing ship was damaged by gunfire in the Caribbean Sea at 11°38′N 67°42′W by U-217 (Kriegsmarine) with the loss of three of the 74 people aboard. The damaged ship rendezvoused with Kassos (Switzerland) which rescued the survivors and salvaged the cargo. Sea Gull D was abandoned and left to sink.
West Celina	United States	World War II: Convoy TAW 5: The Design 1013 cargo ship was torpedoed and sunk in the Atlantic Ocean 95 nautical miles (176 km) northeast of Isla Margarita, Venezuela, (11°45′N 62°30′W) by U-162 (Kriegsmarine) with no loss of her 39 crew or the four members of the convoy commodore's staff, but the convoy commodore was killed. Survivors were rescued by Maracaibo (Venezuela).

== 20 August ==
List of shipwrecks: 20 August 1942
Ship	State	Description
V 312 Hanseat	Kriegsmarine	The Vorpostenboot ran aground on Naissaar, Soviet Union and was wrecked.
Nord	Soviet Union	World War II: The harbor icebreaker was scuttled at Temryuk by the Red Army.
SF 334	Kriegsmarine	The Siebel ferry was lost on this date.
Skagerrak	Kriegsmarine	The auxiliary minelayer was sunk as a target.
U-464	Kriegsmarine	World War II: The Type XIV submarine was depth charged and damaged in the Atlantic Ocean by a Consolidated PBY Catalina aircraft of Squadron VP-73, United States Navy with the loss of two of her 54 crew. She was scuttled by her crew, who were rescued by the fishing trawler Skaftfellingur ( Iceland) and later transferred to HMS Castleton and HMS Newark (both Royal Navy) as prisoners of war.
Voikov	Soviet Union	World War II: The patrol ship (173 GRT) ran aground while transiting from Temryuk to Taman and was destroyed by enemy artillery.

== 21 August ==
List of shipwrecks: 21 August 1942
Ship	State	Description
Burlak	Soviet Navy	World War II: The auxiliary gunboat was scuttled by her crew in the Azov Sea off Temryuk.
City of Wellington	United Kingdom	World War II: The cargo ship was torpedoed and sunk in the Atlantic Ocean south west of Freetown, Sierra Leone (7°29′N 14°40′W) by U-506 (Kriegsmarine) with the loss of seven of her 73 crew. Survivors were rescued by HMS Velox (Royal Navy).
USS Lakatoi	United States Navy	The auxiliary transport, a coaster, capsized and sank in a storm in the Pacific Ocean off the coast of New Caledonia with the loss of a crew member Survivors sailed to New Caledonia, landing five nautical miles (9.3 km) from Pam Head.
Pozarica	Italy	World War II: The tanker was attacked and severely damaged by British aircraft 12 nautical miles (22 km) north of Paxos, Greece.
Shinsei Maru No. 6	Imperial Japanese Navy	World War II: The Tenryu Maru-class auxiliary collier/oiler was torpedoed and sunk in the Pacific Ocean 94 miles (151 km) west of Truk, Caroline Islands (07°02′N 158°03′E) by USS Tambor (United States Navy). A crew member was killed.
Ural	Soviet Navy	The auxiliary gunboat was sunk on this date.

== 22 August ==
List of shipwrecks: 22 August 1942
Ship	State	Description
HMT Awatea; USS Buck	Royal Navy; United States Navy	World War II: The troopship HMT Awatea collided with the Sims-class destroyer USS Buck off the Grand Banks of Newfoundland. The impact dislodged a depth charge, which exploded underneath HMT Awatea. She was subsequently repaired at Halifax, Nova Scotia, Canada. USS Buck was severely damaged. Repairs took until November to complete.
USS Blue	United States Navy	World War II: Battle of Guadalcanal: The Bagley-class destroyer was torpedoed and damaged in the Pacific Ocean off Guadalcanal, Solomon Islands by Kawakaze (Imperial Japanese Navy) with the loss of nine of her 158 crew. She was scuttled the next day.
Chaika	Soviet Union	World War II: The motor boat was captured and scuttled in the Matochkin Strait by U-456 (Kriegsmarine).
Generale Antonio Cantore	Regia Marina	World War II: The Generale Antonio Cantore-class torpedo boat struck a mine and sank north-east of Bomba, Libya. The mine was one of a number laid 17 days previously by HMS Porpoise (Royal Navy).
Hammaren	Sweden	World War II: The cargo ship was torpedoed, shelled and sunk in the Atlantic Ocean 40 nautical miles (74 km) off Salvador, Brazil (13°00′S 38°15′W) by U-507 (Kriegsmarine) with the loss of six of her 31 crew.
USS Ingraham	United States Navy	The Gleaves-class destroyer collided with USS Chemung (United States Navy) and sank in the Atlantic Ocean off Nova Scotia, Dominion of Canada with the loss of 197 of her 208 crew.
Tatsuho Maru	Imperial Japanese Navy	World War II: Convoy No.152: The Tatsuwa Maru-class auxiliary transport was torpedoed and sunk in the East China Sea about 18 nautical miles (33 km) north of Formosa (25°52′N 121°29′E) by USS Haddock (United States Navy). Twenty-six passengers and 12 of her crew were killed.
U-654	Kriegsmarine	World War II: The Type VIIC submarine was depth charged and sunk in the Caribbean Sea north of Colón, Panama by a Douglas B-18 Bolo aircraft of the 45th Bombardment Squadron, United States Army Air Forces with the loss of all 44 crew.

== 23 August ==
List of shipwrecks: 23 August 1942
Ship	State	Description
Ankara	Nazi Germany	World War II: The scow was torpedoed and sunk off Odesa Soviet Union (44°49′N 30°12′E) by M-36 (Soviet Navy).
Bug	Soviet Navy	World War II: The auxiliary gunboat was scuttled by her crew in the Azov Sea after running out of ammunition.
Don	Soviet Navy	World War II: The auxiliary gunboat was scuttled by her crew in the Azov Sea at Temryuk, after running out of ammunition.
Hamla	United Kingdom	World War II: The cargo ship was torpedoed and sunk in the Atlantic Ocean south of Freetown, Sierra Leone (5°30′N 15°00′W) by U-506 (Kriegsmarine) with the loss of all 40 crew.
M 3206 Neubau	Kriegsmarine	World War II: The minesweeper struck a mine and sank in the Scheldt.
Shturman	Soviet Navy	The guard ship was lost on this date.

== 24 August ==
List of shipwrecks: 24 August 1942
Ship	State	Description
Burya	Soviet Navy	World War II: The Uragan-class guard ship was sunk by mines in the Baltic Sea near Suursaari.
Kujbyshev	Soviet Union	World War II: The cargo ship was torpedoed and sunk in the Kara Sea north west of Dikson Island (73°52′N 77°40′E) by U-601 (Kriegsmarine) with the loss of all hands.
M-33	Soviet Navy	World War II: The M-class submarine was sunk by a mine of a flanking barrage laid by the minelayers NMS Amiral Murgescu and Dacia (both Royal Romanian Navy).
HMS ML 103	Royal Navy	World War II: The Fairmile A motor launch was sunk by a mine in the Strait of Dover.
Medvezhonok	Soviet Union	World War II: The harbour tug was shelled and sunk in the Kara Sea (73°52′N 77°40′E) by U-601 (Kriegsmarine) with the loss of all hands.
Moena	Netherlands	World War II: The cargo ship was torpedoed and sunk in the Atlantic Ocean (13°25′N 57°15′W) by U-162 (Kriegsmarine) with the loss of four of her 87 crew. Survivors were rescued by Cromarty (United Kingdom).
Nathaniel Bacon	United States	The Liberty ship collided with Esso Belgium (Belgium) at New York and was beached. She was subsequently repaired and returned to service.
Otowasan Maru	Japan	World War II: The tanker was torpedoed and sunk in the Pacific Ocean west of Manila, Philippines by USS Seawolf (United States Navy).
Peter von Danzig	Germany	World War II: The cargo ship struck a mine and sank in the Kattegat.
Ryūjō	Imperial Japanese Navy	World War II: Battle of the Eastern Solomons: The aircraft carrier was bombed, torpedoed and sunk by aircraft from USS Saratoga (United States Navy) with the loss of 120 of her 924 crew.
Seikai Maru	Japan	World War II: The cargo ship was torpedoed and sunk in the Pacific Ocean off Kinkasan by USS Guardfish (United States Navy).
T-204 Fugas	Soviet Navy	World War II: The Fugas-class minesweeper was sunk by mines in the Baltic Sea near Suursaari.
Tourcoing	Germany	World War II: The cargo ship struck a mine and sank in the Baltic Sea off Swinemünde.

== 25 August ==
List of shipwrecks: 25 August 1942
Ship	State	Description
Abbekerk	Netherlands	World War II: The cargo ship was torpedoed and sunk in the Atlantic Ocean (52°05′N 30°50′W) by U-604 (Kriegsmarine) with the loss of two of her 64 crew. Survivors were rescued by HMS Wallflower (Royal Navy).
Amakura	United Kingdom	World War II: Convoy WAT 15: The cargo ship straggled behind the convoy. She was torpedoed and sunk in the Caribbean Sea 90 nautical miles (170 km) south east of Port Morant, Jamaica (17°46′N 75°52′W) by U-558 (Kriegsmarine) with the loss of thirteen of her 44 crew.
Aleksandr Sibiryakov	Soviet Navy	World War II: Operation Wunderland: The icebreaker was shelled and sunk in the Kara Sea off Russky Island by Admiral Scheer (Kriegsmarine). Seventy-nine people were killed, nineteen were taken as prisoners of war, and one was rescued by the Soviets.
B D Co. No. 4	United States	The scow was stranded and lost at Iron Creek in Norton Sound, Territory of Alaska. The wreck report does not specify at which of several places of the name the wreck took place.
Cuba Maru	Imperial Japanese Navy	The Cuba Maru-class transport ship ran aground on a reef in the Sea of Okhotsk in dense fog (46°23′N 143°37′E) 13 nautical miles (24 km; 15 mi) east of Kita-Shiretoko-Mishchi. The vessel broke in two during a typhoon on 28 August, and sank on 29 August.
Empire Breeze	United Kingdom	World War II: Convoy ON 122: The cargo ship was torpedoed and damaged in the Atlantic Ocean by U-176 (Kriegsmarine) with the loss of one of her 49 crew. She sank on or after 27 August. Survivors were rescued by Irish Willow (Ireland).
Harmonides	United Kingdom	World War II: The cargo ship was torpedoed and sunk in the Indian Ocean east of the One and a Half Degree Channel (1°47′N 77°27′E) by I-165 (Imperial Japanese Navy). Two gunners and twelve of her crew were killed. There were 71 survivors.
Katvaldis	United Kingdom	World War II: Convoy ONS 122: The cargo ship was torpedoed and sunk in the Atlantic Ocean south east of Cape Farewell, Greenland (48°55′N 35°10′W) by U-605 (Kriegsmarine) with the loss of three of her 43 crew. Survivors were rescued by Stockport (United Kingdom).
Kinryu Maru	Imperial Japanese Navy	World War II: Battle of the Eastern Solomons: The transport ship was bombed and sunk 40 nautical miles (74 km) north east of Santa Isabel Island (07°47′S 160°13′E) by United States Navy aircraft. Survivors were rescued by Mutsuki, Yayoi, PB-01, and PB-02 (all Imperial Japanese Navy). Kinryu Maru was scuttled with a torpedo launched by Mutsuki while the destroyer was sinking.
Mutsuki	Imperial Japanese Navy	World War II: Battle of the Eastern Solomons: The Mutsuki-class destroyer was bombed and sunk 40 nautical miles (74 km) north east of Santa Isabel Island (07°47′S 160°13′E) by four Boeing B-17 Flying Fortress aircraft of the United States Army Air Force while assisting Kinryu Maru (Imperial Japanese Navy). She scuttled Kinryu Maru and was in turn scuttled by Yayoi (Imperial Japanese Navy). Forty-one of her crew were killed and eleven were wounded.
Senyo Maru	Imperial Japanese Navy	World War II: The gunboat was torpedoed and sunk in the East China Sea off Formosa by USS Growler (United States Navy).
Sheaf Mount	United Kingdom	World War II: Convoy ONS 122: The cargo ship was torpedoed and sunk in the Atlantic Ocean south east of Cape Farewell (48°55′N 35°10′W) by U-605 (Kriegsmarine) with the loss of 31 of her 51 crew. Survivors were rescued by Stockport (United Kingdom).
Showa Maru	Japan	World War II: The cargo ship was torpedoed and sunk in the Celebes Sea by USS Seawolf (United States Navy).
Stad Amsterdam	Netherlands	World War II: Convoy WAT 15: The cargo ship straggled behind the convoy. She was torpedoed and sunk in the Caribbean Sea (16°39′N 73°15′W) by U-164 (Kriegsmarine) with the loss of three of her 38 crew.
Trolla	Norway	World War II: Convoy ON 122: The cargo ship was torpedoed and sunk in the Atlantic Ocean (48°55′N 35°10′W) by U-438 (Kriegsmarine) with the loss of six of her 22 crew. Survivors were rescued by Potentilla (Royal Norwegian Navy).
Ulm	Kriegsmarine	World War II: The minelayer was shelled, torpedoed and sunk in the White Sea south east of Bear Island, and 210 nautical miles (390 km) north of Nordkapp, Norway by HMS Marne, HMS Martin, and HMS Onslaught (all Royal Navy) with the loss of 132 of her crew. The Royal Navy destroyers rescued 60 survivors.
Viking Star	United Kingdom	World War II: The cargo ship was torpedoed and sunk in the Atlantic Ocean 160 nautical miles (300 km) south south west of Freetown, Sierra Leone (6°00′N 14°00′W) by U-130 (Kriegsmarine) with the loss of seven of her 61 crew.

== 26 August ==
List of shipwrecks: 26 August 1942
Ship	State	Description
Beechwood	United Kingdom	World War II: The cargo ship (4,897 GRT) was torpedoed and sunk in the Atlantic Ocean south of Monrovia, Liberia (5°30′N 14°04′W) by U-130 (Kriegsmarine) with the loss of one of the 44 people aboard. Her captain was taken aboard U-130 as a prisoner of war. The rest of the survivors were rescued by RFA Fortol (Royal Fleet Auxiliary).
Deznev	Soviet Navy	World War II: Battle of Dikson: The guard ship was shelled and damaged at Dikson Island by Admiral Scheer (Kriegsmarine). She was beached to prevent sinking.
Empire Kumari	United Kingdom	World War II: Convoy LW 38: The cargo ship (6,288 GRT) was torpedoed and damaged in the Mediterranean Sea (31°58′N 34°21′E) by U-375 (Kriegsmarine) with the loss of three of her 92 crew. She was towed to Haifa, Palestine the next day but sank off the breakwater in the evening. The wreck was scrapped in June 1952.
Nankai Maru	Japan	World War II, Battle of Milne Bay: Royal Australian Air Force aircraft sank the Transport ship at the eastern end of Milne Bay, at the eastern end of New Guinea, with several hundred Imperial Japanese Army infantrymen aboard. About 300 of the infantrymen were killed.
Shch-208	Soviet Navy	World War II: The Shchuka-class submarine was sunk by a mine of a flaking barrage, probably laid by the minelayers NMS Amiral Murgescu and NMS Dacia (both Royal Romanian Navy).
UJ-1216 Star XXI	Kriegsmarine	World War II: The auxiliary submarine chaser was sunk near the Vikalla reef in the Gulf of Finland by TK-152 (Soviet Navy) with the loss of 22 lives.
Teinshun Maru	Japan	World War II: The cargo ship was torpedoed and sunk in the Formosa Straits, East China Sea, about 100 nautical miles (190 km; 120 mi) north north west of Keelung, Formosa (26°53′N 121°23′E) by USS Haddock (United States Navy).
RFA Thelma	Royal Fleet Auxiliary	World War II: The cargo ship was torpedoed, shelled and sunk in the Atlantic Ocean (13°20′N 58°10′W) by U-162 (Kriegsmarine) with the loss of two of the 33 people aboard. Survivors were rescued by a Royal Navy ship.
Seven unnamed vessels	Imperial Japanese Navy	World War II, Battle of Milne Bay: Royal Australian Air Force aircraft forced the seven landing barges to strand themselves on the coast of Goodenough Island in the D'Entrecasteaux Islands off the eastern end of New Guinea. About 350 Japanese personnel aboard the barges were left stranded on Goodenough Island.

== 27 August ==
List of shipwrecks: 27 August 1942
Ship	State	Description
Chatham	United States	World War II: Convoy SG 6F: The passenger ship was torpedoed and sunk in the Belle Isle Strait (51°53′N 55°48′W) by U-517 (Kriegsmarine) with the loss of seven passengers and seven of her crew of the 562 people aboard. Survivors were rescued by USS Bernadou (United States Navy), USCGC Mojave ( United States Coast Guard) and HMCS Trail (Royal Canadian Navy) or reached shore in their lifeboats.
Clan Macwhirter	United Kingdom	World War II: Convoy SL 119: The cargo ship was torpedoed and sunk in the Atlantic Ocean west of Gibraltar (35°45′N 18°45′W) by U-156 (Kriegsmarine) with the loss of eleven of her 86 crew. Survivors were rescued by Pedro Nunes (Portuguese Navy).
Cobra	Kriegsmarine	World War II: The auxiliary minelayer was sunk at Schiedam, South Holland, Netherlands, by aircraft.
Deilpi	Italy	World War II: The cargo ship was sunk in the Mediterranean Sea off Cape Spada, Crete, Greece, by Royal Air Force aircraft.
Else	Denmark	World War II: The cargo ship struck a mine and sank in the Kattegat off Samsø.
Esso Aruba	United States	World War II: Convoy TAW 15: The tanker was torpedoed and damaged in the Caribbean Sea 120 nautical miles (220 km) south of Guantánamo Bay, Cuba (18°09′N 74°38′W) by U-511 (Kriegsmarine). She was beached the next day at Guantánamo Bay. She was later repaired, returned to service in February 1943.
Istria	Italy	World War II: The cargo ship was sunk in the Mediterranean Sea off Cape Spada (33°33′N 23°41′E) by Royal Air Force aircraft.
Manfredo Campiero	Italy	World War II: The cargo ship was torpedoed and sunk in the Mediterranean Sea, west of the Antikithera Channel (35°41′N 23°01′E) by HMS Umbra (Royal Navy).
Paolina	Italy	World War II: The cargo ship struck a mine and sank in the Mediterranean Sea 6 nautical miles (11 km) off Cape Bon, Algeria.
Raeter	Kriegsmarine	The coaster ran aground at Hustadvika, Norway. Salvage attempts were abandoned on 3 September and she was declared a total loss.
Rotterdam	Netherlands	World War II: Convoy TAW 15: The tanker was torpedoed and sunk in the Caribbean Sea 120 nautical miles (220 km) south of Guantánamo Bay (18°09′N 74°38′W) by U-511 (Kriegsmarine) with the loss of ten of her 47 crew. Survivors were rescued by USS SC-522 (United States Navy).
V 208 R. Walther Darré	Kriegsmarine	World War II: The Vorpostenboot was sunk at Dieppe, Seine-Inférieure, France by Allied aircraft. She was refloated, repaired and returned to service.
San Fabian	United Kingdom	World War II: Convoy TAW 15: The tanker was torpedoed and sunk in the Caribbean Sea 120 nautical miles (220 km) south south east of Guantánamo Bay (18°09′N 74°38′W) by U-511 (Kriegsmarine) with the loss of 26 of her 59 crew. Survivors were rescued by USS Lea and USS PC-38 (both United States Navy).
Tokai Maru	Japan	World War II: The cargo liner (8,365 GRT) was torpedoed and sunk in the Pacific Ocean off Guam by USS Snapper (United States Navy).

== 28 August ==
List of shipwrecks: 28 August 1942
Ship	State	Description
Arlyn	United States	World War II: Convoy SG 6: The cargo ship straggled behind the convoy. She was torpedoed and damaged in the Belle Isle Strait (51°44′N 55°40′W) by U-165 (Kriegsmarine) with the loss of twelve of her 54 crew. She was abandoned by the survivors, who were rescued by Harjurand (Panama) or reached land in their lifeboat. Arlyn was sunk later that day by U-517 (Kriegsmarine).
Asagiri	Imperial Japanese Navy	World War II: The Fubuki-class destroyer was bombed and sunk near of Santa Isabel Island (08°00′S 160°10′E) by Douglas SBD Dauntless aircraft of the United States Marine Corps from Henderson Field. Sixty troops and 62 of her crew were killed; 135 troops and 135 crew were rescued by Amagiri (Imperial Japanese Navy).
City of Cardiff	United Kingdom	World War II: Convoy SL 119: The cargo ship was torpedoed and sunk in the Atlantic Ocean north west of Lisbon, Portugal (40°20′N 16°02′W) by U-566 (Kriegsmarine) with the loss of 21 of her 84 crew. Survivors were rescued by HMS Rochester (Royal Navy).
Laramie	United States	World War II: The tanker was torpedoed and damaged in the Atlantic Ocean by U-165 (Kriegsmarine). She was then torpedoed and sunk by U-517 (Kriegsmarine).
Smardan	Kingdom of Romania	World War II: The tug was sunk by a mine in the Danube Estuary.
Tokyo Maru	Imperial Japanese Navy	The Canberra Maru-class auxiliary transport ran aground off Yanagijima. She was refloated late on 29 August.
U-94	Kriegsmarine	World War II: The Type VIIC submarine was depth charged, rammed and sunk in the Caribbean Sea (17°40′N 74°30′W by a Consolidated PBY Catalina aircraft of the United States Navy and by HMCS Oakville (Royal Canadian Navy) with the loss of nineteen of her 45 crew.
Zuiderkerk	Netherlands	World War II: Convoy SL 119: The cargo ship was torpedoed and damaged in the Atlantic Ocean north west of Lisbon (40°20′N 16°02′W) by U-566 (Kriegsmarine). The ship was scuttled the next day by HMS Erne, whilst HMS Leith (both Royal Navy) rescued her 68 crew.

== 29 August ==
List of shipwrecks: 29 August 1942
Ship	State	Description
HMS Eridge	Royal Navy	HMS Eridge at harbour after being torpedoed, Alexandria, 29 August 1942 World War II: The Hunt-class destroyer was torpedoed and severely damaged in the Mediterranean Sea off El Daba, Egypt by MTSM-228 (Regia Marina). She was towed to Alexandria by HMS Aldenham (Royal Navy) where she was declared a constructive total loss. HMS Eridge served as a depot ship for the rest of the war and was scrapped in 1946.
I-123	Imperial Japanese Navy	World War II: The I-121-class submarine was depth charged and sunk in the Solomon Sea (09°21′S 160°43′E) by USS Gamble (United States Navy). Lost with all 71 hands.
John Cadwalader	United Kingdom	The coaster was destroyed by fire at Philadelphia, Pennsylvania, United States.
Malaita	Australia	World War II: Battle of Milne Bay: The cargo ship was torpedoed and damaged by Ro-33 (Imperial Japanese Navy). Malaita was later scuttled by HMAS Arunta (Royal Australian Navy).
Ro-33	Imperial Japanese Navy	World War II: Battle of Milne Bay: The Ro-33-class submarine was depth charged and sunk in the Coral Sea 10 nautical miles (19 km) south east of Port Moresby, Papua New Guinea (09°36′S 147°06′E) by HMAS Arunta (Royal Australian Navy). Lost with all 70 hands.
Topa Topa	United States	World War II: The cargo ship was torpedoed and sunk in the Atlantic Ocean 350 nautical miles (650 km) north of Cayenne, French Guiana (10°16′N 51°30′W) by U-66 (Kriegsmarine) with the loss of 25 of the 60 people aboard. Survivors were rescued by Clan Macinnes (United Kingdom).

== 30 August ==
List of shipwrecks: 30 August 1942
Ship	State	Description
USS Casco	United States Navy	World War II: The Barnegat-class seaplane tender was torpedoed and damaged in Nazan Bay by Ro-61 (Imperial Japanese Navy) with the loss of five of her crew. She was beached, but was refloated on 12 September. Subsequently repaired and returned to service.
USS Colhoun	United States Navy	World War II: The high speed transport, a former Wickes-class destroyer, was bombed and sunk in the Pacific Ocean near Guadalcanal, Solomon Islands (9°24′S 160°01′E) by Japanese aircraft with the loss of 51 of her 100 crew.
Jack Carnes	United States	World War II: The tanker was torpedoed and damaged in the Atlantic Ocean (45°35′N 28°02′W) by U-705 (Kriegsmarine). She was torpedoed and sunk the next day (41°35′N 29°01′W) by U-516 (Kriegsmarine) with no loss during the sinking. Survivors sail off in two lifeboats, one with four gunners and 24 of her crew reached the Azores on 5 September. The other lifeboat, containing ten gunners and 28 of her crew, is never seen again.
Jan Tomp	Soviet Union	World War II: The cargo ship (1,988 GRT) was torpedoed and sunk in the Black Sea off Sochi by S 28 and S 102 (Kriegsmarine) with the loss of five of her 42 crew.
Monstella	Regia Marina	World War II: The cargo ship was torpedoed by Rorqual (Royal Navy) and beached at Corfu, Greece. She subsequently became a target ship. She was refloated in 1947 and scrapped in 1948.
Nichiryo Maru	Japan	World War II: Thecargo ship was sunk in the Bering Sea approximately 140 nautical miles (260 km) west north west of Attu Island, Territory of Alaska, by American aircraft.
Sanandrea	Italy	World War II: The cargo ship (5,077 GRT) was bombed and sunk at Santa Maria di Leuca by Royal Air Force aircraft.
Sir Huon	Panama	World War II: The cargo ship was torpedoed and sunk in the Atlantic Ocean (10°52′N 54°00′W) by U-66 (Kriegsmarine). Her 46 crew were rescued by Tambour (Panama) and 13 de Diciembre (Argentina).
Star of Oregon	United States	World War II: The Liberty ship was torpedoed and sunk in the Caribbean Sea off Trinidad (11°48′N 59°45′W) by U-162 (Kriegsmarine) with the loss of one of her 53 crew. Survivors were rescued by a United States Navy patrol boat.
RFA Vardaas	Royal Fleet Auxiliary	World War II: The tanker was torpedoed, shelled and sunk in the Caribbean Sea north east of Tobago (11°35′N 60°40′W) by U-564 (Kriegsmarine). Her 41 crew survived.
West Lashaway	United States	World War II: The Design 1013 ship was torpedoed and sunk in the Atlantic Ocean (10°30′N 55°10′W) by U-66 (Kriegsmarine) with the loss of four passengers, eight gunners and 26 of her crew killed in the sinking or who died during the ordeal after the sinking. Most survivors, a woman and four children who were passengers, a gunner and eleven of her crew, were rescued by HMS Vimy (Royal Navy) on 18 September. A crew member was rescued by a West Indies fishing boat on 24 September.
No. 059	Soviet Navy	The MO-4-class submarine chaser was sunk on this date.

== 31 August ==
List of shipwrecks: 31 August 1942
Ship	State	Description
Bronxville	Norway	World War II: Convoy SC 97: The cargo ship was torpedoed and sunk in the Atlantic Ocean (57°13′N 33°40′W) by U-609 (Kriegsmarine). Her 39 crew were rescued by Perth (United Kingdom).
Capira	Panama	World War II: Convoy SC 97: The cargo ship was torpedoed and sunk in the Atlantic Ocean (57°13′N 33°40′W) by U-609 (Kriegsmarine) with the loss of five of her 54 crew. Survivors were rescued by HMCS Drumheller (Royal Canadian Navy) and Perth (United Kingdom).
Ducca Degli Abruzzi	Italy	World War II: The tanker was damaged off Cape Spada, Crete, Greece by Royal Air Force aircraft and was beached the next day.
Eihuku Maru	Japan	World War II: The cargo ship was torpedoed and sunk in the South China Sea off Formosa (25°43′N 122°38′E) by USS Growler (United States Navy).
Jennie	United States	The fishing vessel sank north of Port Alice (55.8264°N 133.6028°W) on Heceta Island in the Alexander Archipelago, Territory of Alaska.
Picci Fassio	Italy	World War II: The tanker was sunk of Cape Spada by Royal Air Force aircraft.
Ro-61	Imperial Japanese Navy	World War II: The Japanese Type L submarine was depth charged and damaged by two Consolidated PBY Catalina flying boats from Patrol Squadron 42 (VP-42) and Patrol Squadron 43 (VP-43) (both United States Navy), then depth-charged, shelled and sunk in the Bering Sea five miles (8.0 km) north of Cape Shaw (52°07′N 174°30′W) on Atka Island in the Aleutian Islands, Territory of Alaska (52°36′N 173°57′W) by USS Reid (United States Navy). Sixty of her crew were killed, including her commanding officer. Five crewmen were rescued by USS Reid.
Winamac	United Kingdom	World War II: The tanker was torpedoed and sunk in the Atlantic Ocean (10°36′N 54°34′W) by U-66 (Kriegsmarine) with the loss of 30 of her 51 crew. Survivors were rescued by Empire Lugard (United Kingdom).

== Unknown date ==
List of shipwrecks: Unknown date 1942
Ship	State	Description
HMS LCM 23	Royal Navy	The Landing Craft, Mechanized, was lost.
HMS LCM 24	Royal Navy	The Landing Craft, Mechanized was lost.
HMS LCM 34	Royal Navy	The Landing Craft, Mechanized was lost.
HMS LCM 45	Royal Navy	The Landing Craft, Mechanized was lost.
HMS LCM 510	Royal Navy	The Landing Craft, Mechanized was lost.
HMS LCM 516	Royal Navy	The Landing Craft, Mechanized was lost.
HMS LCP(R) 1008	Royal Navy	The Landing Craft Personnel (Ramped) was lost.
M-173	Soviet Navy	The M-class submarine was lost off the coast of Norway sometime between 6 and 18 August.
Morosini	Regia Marina	The Marcello-class submarine was lost to unknown causes in late August in the Bay of Biscay.
U-578	Kriegsmarine	The Type VIIC submarine was lost on patrol in the Bay of Biscay on or after 6 August with the loss of all 40 crew. Cause unknown.
163	Imperial Japanese Navy	World War II: The auxiliary ship was sunk by gunfire in the Pacific Ocean by USS Pompano (United States Navy) sometime after 23 August.
