= Convoy ON 115 =

Convoy ON.115
- Part of World War II
Date	24 July – 8 August 1942
Location	North Atlantic

Belligerents
(Nazi Germany) Germany	Canada; United Kingdom

Commanders and leaders
Admiral Karl Dönitz	Admiral Sir A J Davies (Commodore)

Strength
13 U-boats	43 merchant ships 12 escorts

Casualties and losses
1 U-boat sunk	3 ships sunk 2 damaged 67 killed

Convoy ON 115 was a trade convoy of 43 merchant ships with 12 escort ships during the Second World War. The convoy departed Liverpool on 24 July 1942 and arrived at Boston on 8 August. Three ships were lost to U-boats during the crossing and two were damaged.

== Name ==
It was the 115th of the numbered series of ON convoys Outbound from the British Isles to North America.

== Action ==
The ships departed Liverpool on 24 July 1942 and were joined on 25 July by Mid-Ocean Escort Force Group C-3. They were found on 29 July by the seven U-boats of Wolfpack Wolf. On 31 July U-588 was sunk by the combined efforts of HMCS Skeena and HMCS Wetaskiwin. Six U-boats formed Wolfpack Pirat on 1 August and reached the convoy on 2 August. Three ships were sunk before contact was lost in misty weather on 3 August. Surviving ships reached Boston on 8 August.

== Ships in the convoy ==
Name	Flag	Tonnage (GRT)	Notes
HMCS Agassiz	Royal Canadian Navy		Escort 31 Jul – 3 Aug Corvette
Agwidale (1918)	United States	4,763	Collision then straggled
Arletta (1925)	United Kingdom	4,870	Straggled and sunk by U-458 on 5 Aug SSW of Cape Race. 36 of the 41 crew died. Survivors were picked up by USS Menemsha (AG-39)
Asbjorn (1935)	United Kingdom	4,387	Bound for Sydney
Athelchief (1939)	United Kingdom	10,000	Bound for Curaçao
Belgian Soldier (1941)	Belgium	7,167	Torpedoed and damaged by U-553 then straggled and was sunk by U-607 on 4 Aug 21 dead.
Brimanger (1929)	Norway	4,883	Bound for New York City
Cistula (1939)	Netherlands	8,097	Bound for Halifax
Collingsworth (1920)	United States	5,101	Bound for New York City
Corner Brook (1925)	United Kingdom	5,767	Bound for Halifax
Delhi (1925)	Sweden	4,571	Bound for New York City
Dorcasia (1938)	United Kingdom	8,053	Bound for New York City
El Lago (1920)	Panama	4,221	Straggled
Emma Bakke (1929)	Norway	4,721	13 passengers, bound for New York City
Empire Heywood (1942)	United Kingdom	7,030	Bound for New York City
Empire Ocean (1941)	United Kingdom	6,765	Ashore 4 Aug 42; Sank in tow 5 Aug 42
Empire Southey (1942)	United Kingdom	7,041	
Empire Spray (1941)	United Kingdom	7,242	Bound for Halifax
Empire Trader (1908)	United Kingdom	9,990	Bound for New York City then Auckland
G S Walden (1935)	United Kingdom	10,627	Tanker. Torpedoed by U-552 on 3 Aug east of Cape Race and towed into St. John's, Newfoundland. 1 dead
HMCS Galt	Royal Canadian Navy		Escort 25 Jul – 3 Aug Corvette
Gyda (1934)	United Kingdom	1,695	Bound for Halifax
HMCS Hamilton	Royal Canadian Navy		Escort 2 Aug Destroyer
Herbrand (1935)	Norway	9,108	Bound for Halifax
Hoegh Hood (1936)	Norway	9,351	Bound for Halifax
Jamaica Planter (1936)	United Kingdom	4,098	Bound for New York City
Katy (1931)	Norway	6,825	Bound for New York City
HMCS La Malbaie	Royal Canadian Navy		Escort 3 – 8 Aug Corvette
Lochkatrine (1922)	United Kingdom	9,419	Freighter. In ballast. Sunk by U-553. 9 dead. Survivors picked up by HMCS Hamilton And HMCS Agassiz
HMCS Louisburg	Royal Canadian Navy		Escort 25 Jul – 3 Aug . Took in damaged G S Walden to St. John's, Newfoundland
Lucellum (1938)	United Kingdom	9,425	Returned
Manchester Trader (1941)	United Kingdom	5,671	Bound for Halifax thence Saint John, New Brunswick. Rear-Admiral H C Rawlings (Vice-Commodore)
Montreal City (1920)	United Kingdom	3,066	Bound for New York City
Mount Evans (1919)	Panama	5,598	Bound for New York City
Norsk Tank (1928)	Norway	9,720	Bound for Halifax
Ornefjell (1937)	Norway	1,334	Bound for Halifax
Otina (1938)	United Kingdom	6,217	Bound for Halifax
Pacific Grove (1928)	United Kingdom	7,117	17 Passengers, Bound for New York City. Admiral Sir A J Davies (Commodore)
Regent Panther (1937)	United Kingdom	9,556	Bound for New York City
HMCS Rimouski	Royal Canadian Navy		Escort 3 – 8 Aug Corvette
Robert F Hand (1933)	United Kingdom	2,197	Bound for Halifax
HMCS Sackville	Royal Canadian Navy		Escort 25 Jul – 4 Aug Corvette
HMCS Saguenay	Royal Canadian Navy		Escort 25 Jul – 1 Aug Destroyer
San Ernesto (1939)	United Kingdom	8,078	Bound for New York City
Seminole (1936)	United Kingdom	10,389	Bound for New York City
HMCS Skeena	Royal Canadian Navy		Escort 25 – 31 Jul Destroyer sunk U-588 with depth charges on 31 Jul
Solfonn (1939)	Norway	9,925	Bound for Aruba
Tilapa (1928)	United Kingdom	5,392	Bound for Halifax
Topdalsfjord (1921)	Norway	4,271	Bound for Hampton Roads
Tudor Prince (1940)	United Kingdom	1,914	Bound for Halifax
USS Swanson	United States Navy		Escort. Destroyer
HMS Verity	Royal Navy		Escort 3 – 8 Aug Destroyer
Westland (1931)	Netherlands	5,888	9 Passengers, Bound for New York City
HMCS Wetaskiwin	Royal Canadian Navy		Escort 25 Jul – 2 Aug Corvette. Sunk U-588 with depth charges on 31 Jul
HMS Witch	Royal Navy		Escort 2 Aug Destroyer

== Bibliography ==
- Hague, Arnold (2000). The Allied Convoy System 1939–1945. ISBN 1-86176-147-3.
- Rohwer, J.; Hummelchen, G. (1992). Chronology of the War at Sea 1939–1945. Naval Institute Press. ISBN 1-55750-105-X.
