= German submarine U-256 =

German World War II submarine

History

Nazi Germany
- Name: U-256
- Ordered: 23 December 1939
- Builder: Bremer Vulkan, Bremen-Vegesack
- Yard number: 21
- Laid down: 15 February 1941
- Launched: 28 October 1941
- Commissioned: 18 December 1941
- Stricken: November 1942
- Notes: Converted to a Flak boat, May 1943
- Recommissioned: 16 August 1943
- Stricken: 23 October 1944
- Fate: Captured in May 1945 at Bergen, Norway, and broken up

General characteristics
- Class & type: Type VIIC submarine
- Displacement: 769 tonnes (757 long tons) surfaced; 871 t (857 long tons) submerged
- Length: 67.10 m (220 ft 2 in) o/a; 50.50 m (165 ft 8 in) pressure hull
- Beam: 6.20 m (20 ft 4 in) o/a; 4.70 m (15 ft 5 in) pressure hull
- Height: 9.60 m (31 ft 6 in)
- Draught: 4.74 m (15 ft 7 in)
- Installed power: 2,800–3,200 PS (2,100–2,400 kW; 2,800–3,200 bhp) (diesels); 750 PS (550 kW; 740 shp) (electric)
- Propulsion: 2 shafts; 2 × diesel engines; 2 × electric motors
- Speed: 17.7 knots (32.8 km/h; 20.4 mph) surfaced; 7.6 knots (14.1 km/h; 8.7 mph) submerged
- Range: 8,500 nmi (15,700 km; 9,800 mi) at 10 knots (19 km/h; 12 mph) surfaced; 80 nmi (150 km; 92 mi) at 4 knots (7.4 km/h; 4.6 mph) submerged
- Test depth: 230 m (750 ft); Crush depth: 250–295 m (820–968 ft)
- Complement: 4 officers, 40–56 enlisted
- Armament: 5 × 53.3 cm (21 in) torpedo tubes (four bow, one stern); 14 × torpedoes or 26 TMA mines; 1 × 8.8 cm (3.46 in) deck gun (220 rounds); 1 × 2 cm (0.79 in) C/30 anti-aircraft gun

Service record
- Part of: 8th U-boat Flotilla; 18 December 1941 – 31 July 1942; 9th U-boat Flotilla; 1 August – 30 November 1942; 16 August 1943 – 25 June 1944; 16 August – 23 October 1944
- Identification codes: M 47 855
- Commanders: Oblt.z.S. / Kptlt. Odo Loewe, Jr.; 18 December 1941 – 30 November 1942; Oblt.z.S. Wilhelm Brauel; 16 August 1943 – 25 June 1944; K.Kapt. Heinrich Lehmann-Willenbrock; 2 September – 23 October 1944
- Operations: 5 patrols: 1st patrol: a. 28 July – 3 September 1942; b. 22 – 23 September 1942; 2nd patrol: 4 October – 17 November 1943; 3rd patrol: 25 January – 22 March 1944; 4th patrol: 6 – 8 June 1944; 5th patrol: 4 September – 17 October 1944
- Victories: 1 warship sunk (1,300 tons)

German submarine U-256 was a Type VIIC U-boat of Nazi Germany's Kriegsmarine during World War II, she also served for a short time as an anti-aircraft submarine under the designation U-flak 2. During her career, U-256 completed five wartime patrols and sank one warship of 1,300 tons.

The submarine was laid down on 15 February 1941 at the Bremer Vulkan yard at Bremen-Vegesack as yard number 21. She was launched on 28 October and commissioned on 18 December under the command of Oberleutnant zur See Odo Loewe.

U-256 was assigned to the 8th U-Boat Flotilla for training, then transferred to the 9th U-boat Flotilla for operational service.

== Design ==
German Type VIIC submarines were preceded by the shorter Type VIIB submarines. U-256 had a displacement of 769 tonnes (757 long tons) when at the surface and 871 tonnes (857 long tons) while submerged. She had a total length of 67.10 m (220 ft 2 in), a pressure hull length of 50.50 m (165 ft 8 in), a beam of 6.20 m (20 ft 4 in), a height of 9.60 m (31 ft 6 in), and a draught of 4.74 m (15 ft 7 in). The submarine was powered by two Germaniawerft F46 four-stroke, six-cylinder supercharged diesel engines producing a total of 2,800 to 3,200 metric horsepower (2,060 to 2,350 kW; 2,760 to 3,160 shp) for use while surfaced, two AEG GU 460/8–27 double-acting electric motors producing a total of 750 metric horsepower (550 kW; 740 shp) for use while submerged. She had two shafts and two 1.23 m (4 ft) propellers. The boat was capable of operating at depths of up to 230 metres (750 ft).

The submarine had a maximum surface speed of 17.7 knots (32.8 km/h; 20.4 mph) and a maximum submerged speed of 7.6 knots (14.1 km/h; 8.7 mph). When submerged, the boat could operate for 80 nautical miles (150 km; 92 mi) at 4 knots (7.4 km/h; 4.6 mph); when surfaced, she could travel 8,500 nautical miles (15,700 km; 9,800 mi) at 10 knots (19 km/h; 12 mph). U-256 was fitted with five 53.3 cm (21 in) torpedo tubes (four fitted at the bow and one at the stern), fourteen torpedoes, one 8.8 cm (3.46 in) SK C/35 naval gun, 220 rounds, and one 2 cm (0.79 in) C/30 anti-aircraft gun. The boat had a complement of between forty-four and sixty.

== Service history ==
=== First patrol ===
U-256's first patrol began on 28 July 1942 during her transfer from Kiel, Germany to the 9. Unterseebootsflottille at Brest in occupied France.

During the patrol, U-256 unsuccessfully pursued Convoy SC 94, and early on 25 August was detected by the radar of the Norwegian Flower-class corvette HNoMS Eglantine astern of convoy ON 122. The U-boat crash-dived when illuminated by star shells, the corvette attacked with depth charges. The boat eventually made her escape when the corvette was obliged to return to convoy protection duties, but the submarine was damaged enough to have to abort the patrol.

On the return journey, on the morning of 2 September, the U-boat was attacked by a British Whitley bomber of No. 77 Squadron RAF in the Bay of Biscay. The aircraft strafed and dropped several bombs, but the U-boat's flak hit the aircraft and it crashed into the sea. U-256 limped into Lorient the next day, due to the extensive damage from the two attacks, she was withdrawn from service in November 1942.

=== Second patrol ===
During an overhaul which included extensive repairs, U-256 was converted to a Flakboot (Flak boat) in May 1943. One of just four U-boats so modified, she was given an increased complement of anti-aircraft guns, to give her and other German submarines a better chance of fighting off enemy aircraft. U-256 was re-commissioned as U-flak 2 on 16 August 1943.

The boat's second wartime patrol started on 4 October under the command of Oblt.z.S. Wilhelm Brauel; her mission was to rendezvous with and protect U-488, a Milchkuh ('Milk cow' or re-supply U-boat). Such submarines could re-supply multiple U-boats at sea, and were consequently the prime target of Allied aircraft trying to disrupt U-boat activities.

On 8 October, the outbound boat was attacked by a Leigh light-equipped British Wellington bomber of No. 612 Squadron RAF in the Bay of Biscay. U-256 was not damaged by the six depth charges that straddled her, and escaped by crash-diving. U-256's return fire had hit the starboard elevator and rear turret of the aircraft, but it returned safely to base.

U-flak 2 was caught on the surface by the American destroyer USS Borie on 31 October. The U-boat escaped, but with minor depth charge damage.

On 16 November the inbound boat encountered a Halifax Mk.II aircraft of No. 502 Squadron RAF in the Bay of Biscay. The aircraft was damaged by flak and turned away. When the Halifax returned to the area, the U-boat had already escaped by crash-diving.

U-flak 2 returned to her base at Brest on 17 November. The Flak conversion was not considered a success, U-flak 2 was converted back to her original configuration in the winter of 1943–44 and renamed U-256.

=== Third patrol ===
U-256's third patrol started on 25 January 1944. She steamed west and southwest of Ireland and on 20 February damaged the anti-submarine sloop, HMS Woodpecker which later sank while under tow. On 19 March, inbound in the Bay of Biscay, the U-boat was strafed by a Leigh light-equipped British Liberator of 224 Squadron. The Germans observed hits from their 20 mm and 37 mm AA guns, before the aircraft dropped six depth charges, then crashed 500 meters away. The boat was not damaged in the attack, and returned to Brest on the 22nd.

=== Fourth patrol ===
U-256 sailed from Brest on 6 June 1944 "(D-Day)", but was seriously damaged when attacked by another Liberator, also of 224 Squadron the next day, and returned to Brest on the eighth.

=== Fifth patrol ===
On 4 September 1944, under the command of Korvettenkapitän Heinrich Lehmann-Willenbrock, U-256 became the last U-boat to leave Brest before the port was captured by the Allies. The transit from Brest to Bergen in Norway, would be U-256's last patrol. She reached her destination on 17 October, and was decommissioned there on 23 October.

=== Wolfpacks ===
U-256 took part in five wolfpacks, namely:

- Steinbrinck (7 – 11 August 1942)
- Lohs (11 – 25 August 1942)
- Igel 2 (3 – 17 February 1944)
- Hai 1 (17 – 22 February 1944)
- Preussen (22 February - 13 March 1944)

== Summary of raiding history ==
Date	Ship Name	Nationality	Tonnage (Note: Merchant ship tonnages are in gross register tons. Military vessels are listed by tons displacement.)	Fate
20 February 1944	HMS Woodpecker	Royal Navy	1,300	Sunk

== Bibliography ==
- Bishop, Chris (2006). Kriegsmarine U-Boats, 1939-45. London: Amber Books. ISBN 978-1-904687-96-2.
- Busch, Rainer; Röll, Hans-Joachim (1999). German U-boat commanders of World War II : a biographical dictionary. Translated by Brooks, Geoffrey. London, Annapolis, Md: Greenhill Books, Naval Institute Press. ISBN 1-55750-186-6.
- Busch, Rainer; Röll, Hans-Joachim (1999). Der U-Boot-Krieg, 1939-1945: Deutsche U-Boot-Verluste von September 1939 bis Mai 1945 [German U-boat losses from September 1939 to May 1945] (in German). Vol. IV. Hamburg, Berlin, Bonn: Mittler. ISBN 3-8132-0514-2.
- Gröner, Erich; Jung, Dieter; Maass, Martin (1991). U-boats and Mine Warfare Vessels. German Warships 1815–1945. Vol. 2. Translated by Thomas, Keith; Magowan, Rachel. London: Conway Maritime Press. ISBN 0-85177-593-4.
- Williamson, Gordon (2005). Wolf Pack: The Story of the U-boat in World War II. Osprey. ISBN 1841768723.
