= German submarine U-658 =

German World War II submarine

History

Nazi Germany
- Name: U-658
- Ordered: 9 October 1939
- Builder: Howaldtswerke, Hamburg
- Yard number: 807
- Laid down: 15 November 1940
- Launched: 11 September 1941
- Commissioned: 5 November 1941
- Fate: Sunk on 30 October 1942 in the North Atlantic E of Newfoundland in position 50°32′N 46°32′W, by depth charges from RCAF Hudson bomber.

General characteristics
- Class & type: Type VIIC submarine
- Displacement: 769 tonnes (757 long tons) surfaced; 871 t (857 long tons) submerged
- Length: 67.10 m (220 ft 2 in) o/a; 50.50 m (165 ft 8 in) pressure hull
- Beam: 6.20 m (20 ft 4 in) o/a; 4.70 m (15 ft 5 in) pressure hull
- Draught: 4.74 m (15 ft 7 in)
- Installed power: 2,800–3,200 PS (2,100–2,400 kW; 2,800–3,200 bhp) (diesels); 750 PS (550 kW; 740 shp) (electric)
- Propulsion: 2 shafts; 2 × diesel engines; 2 × electric motors
- Speed: 17.7 knots (32.8 km/h; 20.4 mph) surfaced; 7.6 knots (14.1 km/h; 8.7 mph) submerged
- Range: 8,500 nmi (15,700 km; 9,800 mi) at 10 knots (19 km/h; 12 mph) surfaced; 80 nmi (150 km; 92 mi) at 4 knots (7.4 km/h; 4.6 mph) submerged
- Test depth: 230 m (750 ft); Crush depth: 250–295 m (820–968 ft)
- Complement: 4 officers, 40–56 enlisted
- Armament: 5 × 53.3 cm (21 in) torpedo tubes (4 bow, 1 stern); 14 × torpedoes; 1 × 8.8 cm (3.46 in) deck gun (220 rounds); 1 x 2 cm (0.79 in) C/30 AA gun

Service record
- Part of: 8th U-boat Flotilla; 5 November 1941 – 31 July 1942; 6th U-boat Flotilla; 1 August – 30 October 1942
- Identification codes: M 43 405
- Commanders: Kptlt. Hans Senkel; 5 November 1941 – 30 October 1942
- Operations: 2 patrols: 1st patrol: 7 July – 12 September 1942; 2nd patrol: 6 – 30 October 1942
- Victories: 3 merchant ships sunk (12,146 GRT); 1 merchant ship damaged (6,466 GRT)

German submarine U-658 was a Type VIIC U-boat built for Nazi Germany's Kriegsmarine for service during World War II. She was laid down on 15 November 1940 by Howaldtswerke, Hamburg as yard number 807, launched on 11 September 1941 and commissioned on 5 November 1941 under Kapitänleutnant Hans Senkel.

== Design ==
German Type VIIC submarines were preceded by the shorter Type VIIB submarines. U-658 had a displacement of 769 tonnes (757 long tons) when at the surface and 871 tonnes (857 long tons) while submerged. She had a total length of 67.10 m (220 ft 2 in), a pressure hull length of 50.50 m (165 ft 8 in), a beam of 6.20 m (20 ft 4 in), a height of 9.60 m (31 ft 6 in), and a draught of 4.74 m (15 ft 7 in). The submarine was powered by two Germaniawerft F46 four-stroke, six-cylinder supercharged diesel engines producing a total of 2,800 to 3,200 metric horsepower (2,060 to 2,350 kW; 2,760 to 3,160 shp) for use while surfaced, two Siemens-Schuckert GU 343/38-8 double-acting electric motors producing a total of 750 metric horsepower (550 kW; 740 shp) for use while submerged. She had two shafts and two 1.23 m (4 ft) propellers. The boat was capable of operating at depths of up to 230 metres (750 ft).

The submarine had a maximum surface speed of 17.7 knots (32.8 km/h; 20.4 mph) and a maximum submerged speed of 7.6 knots (14.1 km/h; 8.7 mph). When submerged, the boat could operate for 80 nautical miles (150 km; 92 mi) at 4 knots (7.4 km/h; 4.6 mph); when surfaced, she could travel 8,500 nautical miles (15,700 km; 9,800 mi) at 10 knots (19 km/h; 12 mph). U-658 was fitted with five 53.3 cm (21 in) torpedo tubes (four fitted at the bow and one at the stern), fourteen torpedoes, one 8.8 cm (3.46 in) SK C/35 naval gun, 220 rounds, and a 2 cm (0.79 in) C/30 anti-aircraft gun. The boat had a complement of between forty-four and sixty.

== Service history ==
The boat's career began with training at 8th U-boat Flotilla on 5 November 1941, followed by active service on 1 August 1942 as part of the 6th Flotilla for the remainder of her service.

In two patrols she sank three merchant ships, for a total of 12,146 gross register tons (GRT) and damaged one other.

=== Wolfpacks ===
U-658 took part in two wolfpacks, namely:

- Panther (13 – 20 October 1942)
- Veilchen (20 – 30 October 1942)

=== Fate ===
U-658 was sunk on 30 October 1942 in the North Atlantic east of Newfoundland, in position 50°32′N 46°32′W, by depth charges from RCAF Hudson bomber from 145 Squadron. There were no survivors.

== Summary of raiding history ==
Date	Ship Name	Nationality	Tonnage (GRT)	Fate
13 August 1942	Medea	Netherlands	1,311	Sunk
17 August 1942	Fort la Reine	United Kingdom	7,133	Sunk
17 August 1942	Laguna	United Kingdom	6,466	Damaged
17 August 1942	Samir	Egypt	3,702	Sunk

== Bibliography ==
- Busch, Rainer; Röll, Hans-Joachim (1999). German U-boat commanders of World War II : a biographical dictionary. Translated by Brooks, Geoffrey. London, Annapolis, Md: Greenhill Books, Naval Institute Press. ISBN 1-55750-186-6.
- Busch, Rainer; Röll, Hans-Joachim (1999). Der U-Boot-Krieg, 1939-1945: Deutsche U-Boot-Verluste von September 1939 bis Mai 1945 [German U-boat losses from September 1939 to May 1945] (in German). Vol. IV. Hamburg, Berlin, Bonn: Mittler. ISBN 3-8132-0514-2.
- Gröner, Eric; Jung, Dieter; Maass, Martin (1991). German Warships 1815-1945: U-boats and Mine Warfare Vessels. Vol. 2. Translated by Thomas, Keith; Magowan, Rachel. London: Conway Maritime Press. ISBN 0-85177-593-4.
- Sharpe, Peter (1998). U-Boat Fact File. Great Britain: Midland Publishing. ISBN 1-85780-072-9.
