= Wolfpack Lohs =

Lohs was a "wolfpack" of German U-boats that operated from August 1 to September 22, 1942 in World War II. This pack patrolled both sides of the Atlantic Ocean, preying on merchant vessels coming to Europe from the Americas.

== U-boats involved ==
The U-boats that made up Wolfpack Lohs included:

- U-135
- U-176
- U-216
- U-256
- U-259
- U-373
- U-410
- U-432
- U-438
- U-462
- U-569
- U-593
- U-596
- U-599
- U-605
- U-660
- U-705
- U-755

== Raiding career ==
Lohs was responsible for the sinking of eight ships in the Atlantic Ocean.

Date	U-boat	Ship	Nationality	Tonnage	Fate
15 August 1942	U-705	Balladier	United States	3,279	Sunk
16 August 1942	U-596	Suecia	Sweden	4,966	Sunk
25 August 1942	U-176	Empire Breeze	United Kingdom	7,457	Sunk
25 August 1942	U-605	Katvaldis	United Kingdom	3,163	Sunk
25 August 1942	U-605	Sheaf Mount	United Kingdom	5,017	Sunk
25 August 1942	U-438	Trolla	Norway	1,598	Sunk
9 September 1942	U-755	USS Muskeget	United States Navy	1,827	Sunk
20 September 1942	U-596	Empire Hartebeeste	United Kingdom	5,676	Sunk
