= German submarine U-259 =

German World War II submarine

History

Nazi Germany
- Name: U-259
- Ordered: 23 December 1939
- Builder: Bremer Vulkan, Bremen-Vegesack
- Yard number: 24
- Laid down: 25 March 1941
- Launched: 30 December 1941
- Commissioned: 18 February 1942
- Fate: Sunk, 15 November 1942

General characteristics
- Class & type: Type VIIC submarine
- Displacement: 769 tonnes (757 long tons) surfaced; 871 t (857 long tons) submerged
- Length: 67.10 m (220 ft 2 in) o/a; 50.50 m (165 ft 8 in) pressure hull
- Beam: 6.20 m (20 ft 4 in) o/a; 4.70 m (15 ft 5 in) pressure hull
- Height: 9.60 m (31 ft 6 in)
- Draught: 4.74 m (15 ft 7 in)
- Installed power: 2,800–3,200 PS (2,100–2,400 kW; 2,800–3,200 bhp) (diesels); 750 PS (550 kW; 740 shp) (electric)
- Propulsion: 2 shafts; 2 × diesel engines; 2 × electric motors
- Speed: 17.7 knots (32.8 km/h; 20.4 mph) surfaced; 7.6 knots (14.1 km/h; 8.7 mph) submerged
- Range: 8,500 nmi (15,700 km; 9,800 mi) at 10 knots (19 km/h; 12 mph) surfaced; 80 nmi (150 km; 92 mi) at 4 knots (7.4 km/h; 4.6 mph) submerged
- Test depth: 230 m (750 ft); Crush depth: 250–295 m (820–968 ft)
- Complement: 4 officers, 40–56 enlisted
- Armament: 5 × 53.3 cm (21 in) torpedo tubes (4 bow, 1 stern); 14 × torpedoes or 26 TMA mines; 1 × 8.8 cm (3.46 in) deck gun (220 rounds); 1 × 2 cm (0.79 in) C/30 anti-aircraft gun

Service record
- Part of: 5th U-boat Flotilla; 18 February – 31 August 1942; 3rd U-boat Flotilla; 1 September – 15 November 1942
- Identification codes: M 40 438
- Commanders: Oblt.z.S. / Kptlt. Klaus Köpke; 18 February – 15 November 1942
- Operations: 2 patrols: 1st patrol: 29 August – 5 October 1942; 2nd patrol: 5 – 15 November 1942
- Victories: None

German submarine U-259 was a Type VIIC U-boat of Nazi Germany's Kriegsmarine during World War II. The submarine was laid down on 25 March 1941 at the Bremer Vulkan yard at Bremen-Vegesack, launched on 30 December 1941, and commissioned on 18 February 1942 under the command of Kapitänleutnant Klaus Köpke. After training with the 5th U-boat Flotilla at Kiel, U-259 was transferred to the 3rd U-boat Flotilla, based at La Pallice, France, for front-line service from 1 September 1942.

U-259 sank no ships in her short career, and was sunk off North Africa on 15 November 1942, during her second combat patrol, by a British Hudson bomber.

== Design ==
German Type VIIC submarines were preceded by the shorter Type VIIB submarines. U-259 had a displacement of 769 tonnes (757 long tons) when at the surface and 871 tonnes (857 long tons) while submerged. She had a total length of 67.10 m (220 ft 2 in), a pressure hull length of 50.50 m (165 ft 8 in), a beam of 6.20 m (20 ft 4 in), a height of 9.60 m (31 ft 6 in), and a draught of 4.74 m (15 ft 7 in). The submarine was powered by two Germaniawerft F46 four-stroke, six-cylinder supercharged diesel engines producing a total of 2,800 to 3,200 metric horsepower (2,060 to 2,350 kW; 2,760 to 3,160 shp) for use while surfaced, two AEG GU 460/8–27 double-acting electric motors producing a total of 750 metric horsepower (550 kW; 740 shp) for use while submerged. She had two shafts and two 1.23 m (4 ft) propellers. The boat was capable of operating at depths of up to 230 metres (750 ft).

The submarine had a maximum surface speed of 17.7 knots (32.8 km/h; 20.4 mph) and a maximum submerged speed of 7.6 knots (14.1 km/h; 8.7 mph). When submerged, the boat could operate for 80 nautical miles (150 km; 92 mi) at 4 knots (7.4 km/h; 4.6 mph); when surfaced, she could travel 8,500 nautical miles (15,700 km; 9,800 mi) at 10 knots (19 km/h; 12 mph). U-259 was fitted with five 53.3 cm (21 in) torpedo tubes (four fitted at the bow and one at the stern), fourteen torpedoes, one 8.8 cm (3.46 in) SK C/35 naval gun, 220 rounds, and one 2 cm (0.79 in) C/30 anti-aircraft gun. The boat had a complement of between forty-four and sixty.

== Service history ==
=== First patrol ===
U-259 sailed from Kiel on 29 August 1942, and headed out into the mid-Atlantic, joining Wolfpack Lohs from 3 to 22 September, and Wolfpack Blitz from 22 to 25 September, but had no success. The U-boat arrived at La Pallice on 5 October after 38 days at sea.

=== Second patrol ===
U-259 departed La Pallice on 5 November 1942 as part of Wolfpack Delphin, entered the Mediterranean Sea through the Strait of Gibraltar, and joined Wolfpack Wal on 12 November.

=== Sinking ===
On 15 November the U-boat was attacked by a British Hudson light bomber of No. 500 Squadron RAF, north of Algiers, in position 37°20′N 3°5′E. U-259 was sunk with all 48 hands when one of the depth charges exploded on contact.

=== Wolfpacks ===
U-259 took part in four wolfpacks, namely:

- Lohs (13 – 22 September 1942)
- Blitz (22 – 25 September 1942)
- Delphin (5 – 12 November 1942)
- Wal (12 – 15 November 1942)

== See also ==
- Mediterranean U-boat Campaign (World War II)

== Bibliography ==
- Busch, Rainer; Röll, Hans-Joachim (1999). German U-boat commanders of World War II : a biographical dictionary. Translated by Brooks, Geoffrey. London, Annapolis, Md: Greenhill Books, Naval Institute Press. ISBN 1-55750-186-6.
- Busch, Rainer; Röll, Hans-Joachim (1999). Der U-Boot-Krieg, 1939-1945: Deutsche U-Boot-Verluste von September 1939 bis Mai 1945 [German U-boat losses from September 1939 to May 1945] (in German). Vol. IV. Hamburg, Berlin, Bonn: Mittler. ISBN 3-8132-0514-2.
- Gröner, Erich; Jung, Dieter; Maass, Martin (1991). U-boats and Mine Warfare Vessels. German Warships 1815–1945. Vol. 2. Translated by Thomas, Keith; Magowan, Rachel. London: Conway Maritime Press. ISBN 0-85177-593-4.
- Kemp, Paul (1999). U-Boats Destroyed - German Submarine Losses in the World Wars. London: Arms & Armour. ISBN 1-85409-515-3.
- Bishop, Chris (2006). Kriegsmarine U-Boats, 1939-45. London: Amber Books. ISBN 978-1-904687-96-2.
