= Wolfpack Tümmler =

Tümmler (English: Dolphin) was a wolf pack of German U-boats that operated from October 1–11, 1942 in World War II. This pack was sent into the Mediterranean Sea from their French bases and all of them succeeded in getting through the Strait of Gibraltar safely.

== U-boats involved ==
- U-458
- U-593
- U-605
- U-660
- U-202

== Sources ==
- http://uboat.net/ops/wolfpacks/1942.htm
