= MV Kinryu Maru =

Japanese ship

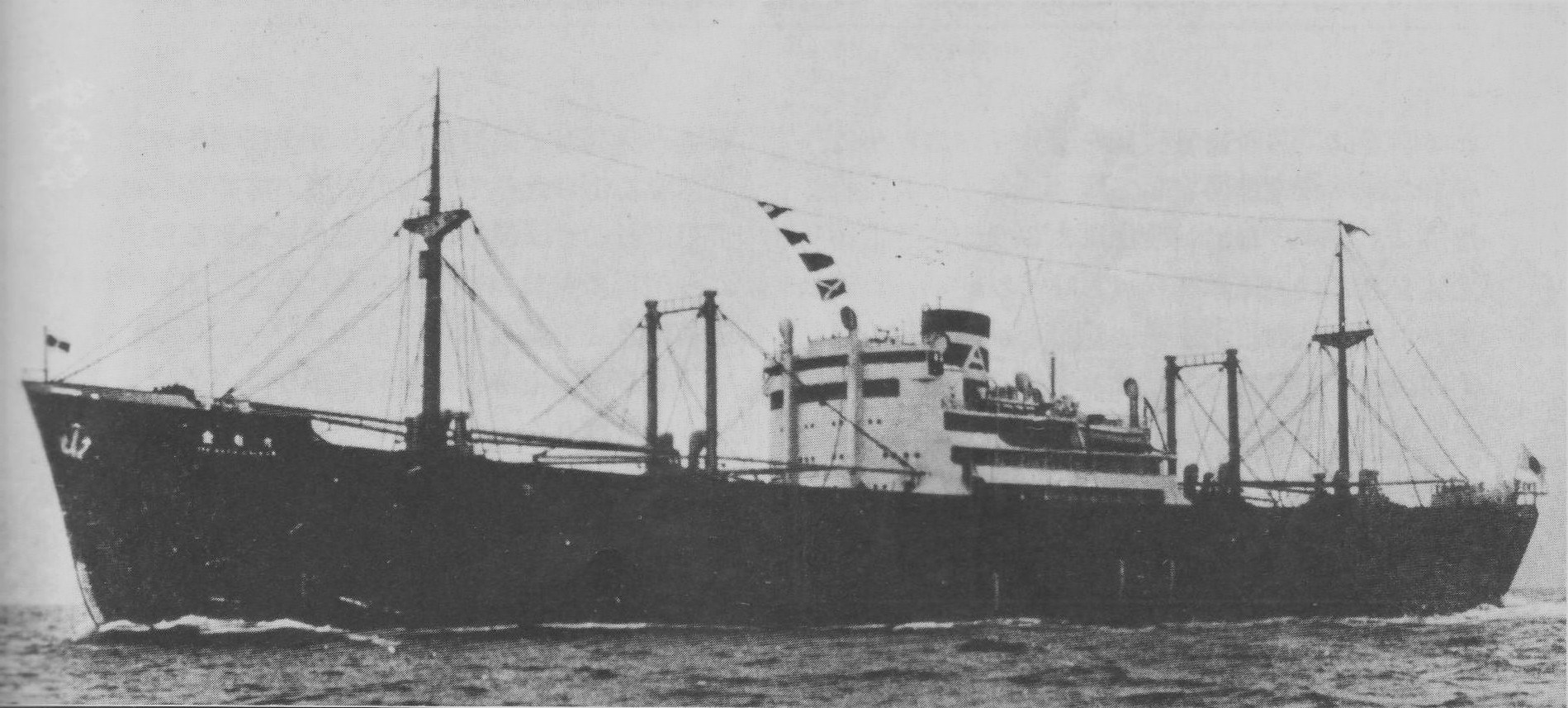
- Kinryu Maru in 1938.

History
- Name: Kinryu Maru
- Owner: Kokusai Kisen Kabushiki Kaisha (1937–1938); Imperial Japanese Navy (1938–1942)
- Builder: Kawasaki Dockyard Company, Kobe
- Launched: 16 June 1938
- Acquired: 1 September 1938
- Decommissioned: 1 October 1942
- Fate: Sunk by US carrier aircraft on 25 August 1942

General characteristics
- Type: Passenger/cargo ship
- Tonnage: 9,310 GRT
- Length: 475.7 ft (145.0 m)
- Beam: 50 ft (15.2 m)
- Draught: 18.8 ft (5.7 m)

MV Kinryu Maru was a 9,310 gross register tons (GRT) passenger cargo ship built by Kawasaki Dockyard Company, Kobe for Kokusai Kisen Kabushiki Kaisha in 1937. She was requisitioned on 1 September 1938 by the Imperial Japanese Navy and later converted to an armed merchant ship.

Kinryu Maru was at Kwajalein, from which she deployed as part of the Japanese task force in the first attempt to invade Wake Island on 8 December 1941. She returned to Kwajalein and the landing force was called off and later participated in the second attack on Wake Island on 21 December 1941, which succeeded in taking the island. She also took part in the invasions of New Britain, New Ireland and Lae.

== Fate ==
On 25 August 1942, north of Guadalcanal, she was attacked by Douglas SBD Dauntless dive bombers and was hit amidships by a 1,000 lb (450 kg) bomb and began sinking. Her embarked troops were evacuated by the destroyers Mutsuki and Yayoi and patrol boats PB-1 and PB-2. Yayoi rescued the ship's survivors, including Captain Yamada. She was removed from the Navy List on 1 October 1942.
