= German submarine U-605 =

German World War II submarine

History

Nazi Germany
- Name: U-605
- Ordered: 22 May 1940
- Builder: Blohm & Voss, Hamburg
- Yard number: 581
- Laid down: 12 March 1941
- Launched: 27 November 1941
- Commissioned: 15 January 1942
- Fate: Sunk on 14 November 1942 in the Mediterranean Sea in position 36°20′N 01°01′W, by depth charges from an RAF Hudson bomber.

General characteristics
- Class & type: Type VIIC submarine
- Displacement: 769 tonnes (757 long tons) surfaced; 871 t (857 long tons) submerged
- Length: 67.10 m (220 ft 2 in) o/a; 50.50 m (165 ft 8 in) pressure hull
- Beam: 6.20 m (20 ft 4 in) o/a; 4.70 m (15 ft 5 in) pressure hull
- Height: 9.60 m (31 ft 6 in)
- Draught: 4.74 m (15 ft 7 in)
- Installed power: 2,800–3,200 PS (2,100–2,400 kW; 2,800–3,200 bhp) (diesels); 750 PS (550 kW; 740 shp) (electric)
- Propulsion: 2 shafts; 2 × diesel engines; 2 × electric motors
- Speed: 17.7 knots (32.8 km/h; 20.4 mph) surfaced; 7.6 knots (14.1 km/h; 8.7 mph) submerged
- Range: 8,500 nmi (15,700 km; 9,800 mi) at 10 knots (19 km/h; 12 mph) surfaced; 80 nmi (150 km; 92 mi) at 4 knots (7.4 km/h; 4.6 mph) submerged
- Test depth: 230 m (750 ft); Crush depth: 250–295 m (820–968 ft)
- Complement: 4 officers, 40–56 enlisted
- Armament: 5 × 53.3 cm (21 in) torpedo tubes (four bow, one stern); 14 × torpedoes or 26 TMA mines; 1 × 8.8 cm (3.46 in) deck gun (220 rounds); 1 x 2 cm (0.79 in) C/30 AA gun

Service record
- Part of: 5th U-boat Flotilla; 15 January – 31 July 1942; 9th U-boat Flotilla; 1 August – 31 October 1942; 29th U-boat Flotilla; 1 – 14 November 1942
- Identification codes: M 28 117
- Commanders: Oblt.z.S. / Kptlt. Herbert-Viktor Schütze; 15 January – 14 November 1942
- Operations: 3 patrols: 1st patrol: 28 July – 4 September 1942; 2nd patrol: 1 – 14 October 1942; 3rd patrol: 21 October – 14 November 1942
- Victories: 3 merchant ships sunk (8,409 GRT)

German submarine U-605 was a Type VIIC U-boat built for Nazi Germany's Kriegsmarine for service during World War II. She was laid down on 12 March 1941 by Blohm & Voss, Hamburg as yard number 581, launched on 27 November 1941 and commissioned on 15 January 1942 under Oberleutnant zur See Herbert-Viktor Schütze.

== Design ==
German Type VIIC submarines were preceded by the shorter Type VIIB submarines. U-605 had a displacement of 769 tonnes (757 long tons) when at the surface and 871 tonnes (857 long tons) while submerged. She had a total length of 67.10 m (220 ft 2 in), a pressure hull length of 50.50 m (165 ft 8 in), a beam of 6.20 m (20 ft 4 in), a height of 9.60 m (31 ft 6 in), and a draught of 4.74 m (15 ft 7 in). The submarine was powered by two Germaniawerft F46 four-stroke, six-cylinder supercharged diesel engines producing a total of 2,800 to 3,200 metric horsepower (2,060 to 2,350 kW; 2,760 to 3,160 shp) for use while surfaced, two Brown, Boveri & Cie GG UB 720/8 double-acting electric motors producing a total of 750 metric horsepower (550 kW; 740 shp) for use while submerged. She had two shafts and two 1.23 m (4 ft) propellers. The boat was capable of operating at depths of up to 230 metres (750 ft).

The submarine had a maximum surface speed of 17.7 knots (32.8 km/h; 20.4 mph) and a maximum submerged speed of 7.6 knots (14.1 km/h; 8.7 mph). When submerged, the boat could operate for 80 nautical miles (150 km; 92 mi) at 4 knots (7.4 km/h; 4.6 mph); when surfaced, she could travel 8,500 nautical miles (15,700 km; 9,800 mi) at 10 knots (19 km/h; 12 mph). U-605 was fitted with five 53.3 cm (21 in) torpedo tubes (four fitted at the bow and one at the stern), fourteen torpedoes, one 8.8 cm (3.46 in) SK C/35 naval gun, 220 rounds, and a 2 cm (0.79 in) C/30 anti-aircraft gun. The boat had a complement of between forty-four and sixty.

== Service history ==
The boat's career began with training at the 5th U-boat Flotilla on 15 January 1942, followed by active service on 1 August 1942 as part of the 9th Flotilla. Just three months later, she transferred to the 29th Flotilla, operating out of La Spezia, for operations in the Mediterranean Sea for the remainder of her service.

In three patrols she sank three merchant ships, for a total of 8,409 gross register tons (GRT).

=== Wolfpacks ===
U-605 took part in three wolfpacks, namely:

- Steinbrinck (7 – 11 August 1942)
- Lohs (11 – 26 August 1942)
- Tümmler (1 – 11 October 1942)

=== Fate ===
U-605 was sunk on 14 November 1942 in the Mediterranean Sea in position 36°20′N 01°01′W, by depth charges from an RAF Hudson bomber. All hands were lost.

== Summary of raiding history ==
Date	Ship Name	Nationality	Tonnage (GRT)	Fate
3 August 1942	Bombay	United Kingdom	229	Sunk
25 August 1942	Katvaldis	United Kingdom	3,163	Sunk
25 August 1942	Sheaf Mount	United Kingdom	5,017	Sunk

== See also ==
- Mediterranean U-boat Campaign (World War II)

== Bibliography ==
- Busch, Rainer; Röll, Hans-Joachim (1999). German U-boat commanders of World War II : a biographical dictionary. Translated by Brooks, Geoffrey. London, Annapolis, Md: Greenhill Books, Naval Institute Press. ISBN 1-55750-186-6.
- Busch, Rainer; Röll, Hans-Joachim (1999). Der U-Boot-Krieg, 1939-1945: Deutsche U-Boot-Verluste von September 1939 bis Mai 1945 [German U-boat losses from September 1939 to May 1945] (in German). Vol. IV. Hamburg, Berlin, Bonn: Mittler. ISBN 3-8132-0514-2.
- Gröner, Eric; Jung, Dieter; Maass, Martin (1991). German Warships 1815-1945: U-boats and Mine Warfare Vessels. Vol. 2. Translated by Thomas, Keith; Magowan, Rachel. London: Conway Maritime Press. ISBN 0-85177-593-4.
- Sharpe, Peter (1998). U-Boat Fact File. Great Britain: Midland Publishing. ISBN 1-85780-072-9.
