= MV Empire Bede =

World War II merchant ship of the United Kingdom

History
- Name: Empire Bede
- Owner: Ministry of War Transport
- Operator: Hain Steamship Co Ltd
- Port of registry: (United Kingdom) Glasgow
- Builder: Harland & Wolff Ltd, Glasgow
- Yard number: 1094
- Launched: 6 January 1942
- Completed: 31 March 1942
- Identification: UK Official Number 168709; Code Letters BCVC
- Fate: Sunk, 18 August 1942

General characteristics
- Tonnage: 6,959 GRT; 42,019 NRT
- Length: 432 ft 7 in (131.85 m)
- Beam: 56 ft 3 in (17.15 m)
- Depth: 34 ft 3 in (10.44 m)
- Propulsion: One 4SCSA oil engine, 490 hp (370 kW)
- Speed: 14 knots (26 km/h)
- Crew: 37, plus 6 DEMS gunners and 2 signalmen

Location of the sinking of Empire Bede off Cuba.

Empire Bede was a 6,959 GRT cargo ship which was built by G M Harland & Wolff Ltd, Glasgow in 1942 for the Ministry of War Transport (MoWT). She had a short career, being damaged by a torpedo and then sunk by gunfire on 18 August 1942.

== Description ==
Empire Bede was built by Harland & Wolff Ltd, Glasgow. She was yard number 1049. Empire Bede was launched on 6 January 1942 and completed on 31 March. She was 432 feet 7 inches (131.85 m) long, with a beam of 56 feet 3 inches (17.15 m) and a depth of 34 feet 3 inches (10.44 m). Her GRT was 6,959 with a NRT of 4,201.

== Career ==
Empire Bede had a short career, she was a member of two convoys.

OS 25

Convoy OS 25 departed Liverpool on 12 April 1942 and arrived at Freetown, Sierra Leone on 29 April. Empire Bede was carrying a cargo of ammunition, guns, stores and tanks.

After leaving the convoy off Freetown, Empire Bede delivered her cargo to Aden and Port Said, Egypt. She then sailed to Port Sudan where a load of cotton was taken aboard. Empire Bede sailed to Cape Town and then departed for New York. On 1 August she picked up 25 survivors from the Clan Line ship SS Clan Macnaughton, which had been torpedoed and sunk by U-155. They were landed at Port of Spain, Trinidad on 5 August.

TAW 13

Convoy TAW 13 departed from Trinidad on 12 August 1942 and arrived at Key West, Florida on 23 August. Empire Bede carried the Vice-Commodore. The convoy headed for the Panama Canal at 5 knots (9.3 km/h) to rendezvous with other ships that were to join the convoy there. At 04:00 British Double Summer Time (06:00 German time) on 12 August, Empire Bede was struck by a torpedo fired by U-553, under the command of Kapitänleutnant Karl Thurmann. Two crew were killed. Her position was 19°35′N 76°25′W. The other 35 crew, six DEMS gunners and two signalmen were picked up by HMS Pimpernel, which later sank Empire Bede by gunfire at 19°41′N 76°50′W. The rescued crew were landed at Santiago de Cuba. Those lost on Empire Bede are commemorated at the Tower Hill Memorial, London.

== Official Numbers and Code Letters ==
Official Numbers were a forerunner to IMO Numbers. Empire Bede had the UK Official Number 1687091 and the Code Letters BCVC.

== Propulsion ==
Empire Bede was propelled by a four-stroke Single Cycle, Single Action diesel engine which had six cylinders of 29 3/8 inches (750 mm) diameter by 59 3/16 inches (1,503 mm) stroke. It was built by Harland & Wolff. The engine could propel the ship at a speed of 14 knots (26 km/h).
