= Wolfpack Steinbrinck =

- Active: 3–11 August 1942
- Country: Nazi Germany
- Branch: Kriegsmarine
- Size: 14 submarines
- Engagements: Convoy ON 115; Convoy SC 94

Commanders
- Notable commanders: Gerd Kelbling; Ernst Mengersen; Erich Topp

Steinbrinck was a wolfpack of German U-boats that operated during the World War II Battle of the Atlantic from 3 August 1942 to 11 August 1942.

== Name ==
The group was named after Otto Steinbrinck (1888 - 1949) German U-boat commander in WW I on U-6, UB-10, UB-18 and UC-65. He sank 204 ships for a total of 243,424 gross register tons (GRT)

== Service ==
The group was responsible for sinking eleven merchant ships 59,560 gross register tons (GRT) and damaging a further three merchant ships 21,074 gross register tons (GRT).

=== Raiding Summary ===
Date	U-boat	Name	Nationality	Tonnage (GRT)	Convoy	Fate
3 August 1942	U-552	G.S. Walden	United Kingdom	10,627	ON 115	Damaged
3 August 1942	U-552	Lochkatrine	United Kingdom	9,419	ON 115	Sunk
4 August 1942	U-607	Belgian Soldier	Belgium	7,167	ON 115	Sunk
5 August 1942	U-593	Spar	Netherlands	3,616	SC 94	Sunk
8 August 1942	U-379	Anneberg	United Kingdom	2,537	SC 94	Sunk
8 August 1942	U-379	Kaimoku	United States	6,367	SC 94	Sunk
8 August 1942	U-176	Kelso	United Kingdom	3,956	SC 94	Sunk
8 August 1942	U-176	Mount Kassion	Greece	7,914	SC 94	Sunk
8 August 1942	U-176	Trehata	United Kingdom	4,817	SC 94	Sunk
9 August 1942	U-176	Radchurch	United Kingdom	3,701	SC 94	Sunk
10 August 1942	U-660	Cape Race	United Kingdom	3,807	SC 94	Sunk
10 August 1942	U-660	Condylis	Greece	4,439	SC 94	Damaged
10 August 1942	U-660	Empire Reindeer	United Kingdom	6,259	SC 94	Sunk
10 August 1942	U-660	Oregon	United Kingdom	6,008	SC 94	Damaged

=== U-boats ===
U-boat	Commander	From	To	Notes
U-71	Hardo Rodler von Roithberg	3 August 1942	7 August 1942	
U-176	Reiner Dierksen	5 August 1942	11 August 1942	
U-210	Rudolf Lemcke	3 August 1942	6 August 1942	U-boat was lost
U-256	Odo Loewe	7 August 1942	11 August 1942	
U-379	Paul-Hugo Kettner	3 August 1942	8 August 1942	U-boat was lost
U-454	Burckhard Hackländer	3 August 1942	11 August 1942	
U-552	Erich Topp	3 August 1942	4 August 1942	
U-593	Gerd Kelbling	3 August 1942	11 August 1942	
U-595	Jürgen Quaet-Faslem	6 August 1942	9 August 1942	
U-597	Eberhard Bopst	3 August 1942	11 August 1942	
U-605	Herbert-Viktor Schütze	7 August 1942	11 August 1942	
U-607	Ernst Mengersen	3 August 1942	10 August 1942	
U-660	Götz Baur	6 August 1942	11 August 1942	
U-704	Horst Wilhelm Kessler	3 August 1942	11 August 1942	

== Bibliography ==
- Edwards, Bernard (1996). Dönitz and the Wolf Packs - The U-boats at War. Cassell Military Classics. pp. 89, 91, 92, 95, 100. ISBN 0-304-35203-9.
