= HMS Kempenfelt (I18) =

British C-class and afterward Canadian destroyer

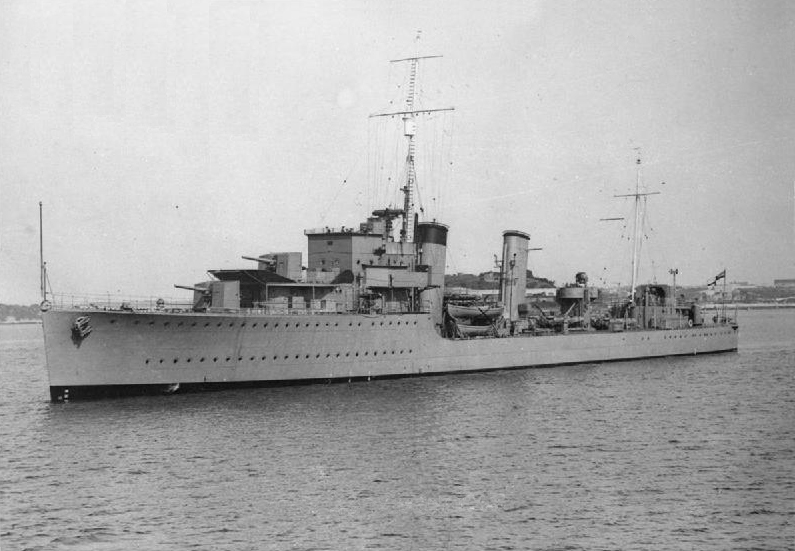
- HMS Kempenfelt in August 1933

History

United Kingdom
- Name: Kempenfelt
- Namesake: Rear Admiral Richard Kempenfelt
- Awarded: 15 July 1930
- Builder: J. Samuel White, Cowes
- Laid down: 18 October 1930
- Launched: 29 October 1931
- Completed: 30 May 1932
- Fate: Transferred to Royal Canadian Navy, 19 October 1939

Canada
- Name: Assiniboine
- Namesake: Assiniboine River
- Commissioned: 19 October 1939
- Decommissioned: 8 August 1945
- Motto: Fideliter (Latin: "Faithfully")
- Nickname(s): "Bones"
- Honours and awards: Atlantic 1939-45, Biscay 1944, English Channel 1944-45
- Fate: Sold for scrapping but wrecked en route to breakers on 10 November 1945; Wreck broken up in situ in 1952
- Badge: Badge: On a field Black a Sword proper between two wings greenover two wavelets Silver and Blue.

General characteristics
- Class & type: C-class destroyer; River-class destroyer
- Displacement: 1,390 long tons (1,412 t) (standard); 1,901 long tons (1,932 t) (deep)
- Length: 329 ft (100.3 m) o/a
- Beam: 33 ft (10.1 m)
- Draught: 12 ft 6 in (3.8 m)
- Installed power: 36,000 shp (27,000 kW)
- Propulsion: 2 × shafts; 2 × Parsons geared steam turbines; 3 × Yarrow water-tube boilers
- Speed: 36 knots (67 km/h; 41 mph)
- Range: 5,500 nmi (10,200 km; 6,300 mi) at 15 knots (28 km/h; 17 mph)
- Complement: 145
- Armament: 4 × 1 - QF 4.7-inch Mark IX guns; 1 × 1 - QF 3-inch 20 cwt anti-aircraft gun; 2 × 1 - QF 2-pounder Mk II AA guns; 2 × 4 - 21 inch (533 mm) torpedo tubes; 6 × depth charges, 3 chutes

HMS Kempenfelt was a C-class destroyer built for the Royal Navy in the early 1930s. A flotilla leader, she saw service in the Home Fleet before World War II and the ship made several deployments to Spanish waters during the Spanish Civil War, enforcing the arms blockade imposed by Britain and France on both sides of the conflict.

Kempenfelt was transferred to the Royal Canadian Navy (RCN) in 1939 and renamed HMCS Assiniboine. During World War II, she served as a convoy escort in the battle of the Atlantic, sinking one German submarine by ramming, on anti-submarine patrols during the invasion of Normandy, and was employed as a troop transport after VE Day for returning Canadian servicemen, before being decommissioned in mid-1945.

Assiniboine was sold for scrap in 1945, but she ran aground while being towed to the breakers and was not broken up until 1952.

== Design and construction ==
Kempenfelt displaced 1,390 long tons (1,412 t) at standard load and 1,901 long tons (1,932 t) at deep load. The ship had an overall length of 329 feet (100.3 m), a beam of 33 feet (10.1 m) and a draught of 12 feet 6 inches (3.8 m). She was powered by Parsons geared steam turbines, driving two shafts, which developed a total of 36,000 shaft horsepower (27,000 kW) and gave a maximum speed of 36 knots (67 km/h; 41 mph). Steam for the turbines was provided by three Yarrow water-tube boilers. Kempenfelt carried a maximum of 473 long tons (481 t) of fuel oil that gave her a range of 5,500 nautical miles (10,200 km; 6,300 mi) at 15 knots (28 km/h; 17 mph). The ship's complement was 175 officers and men.

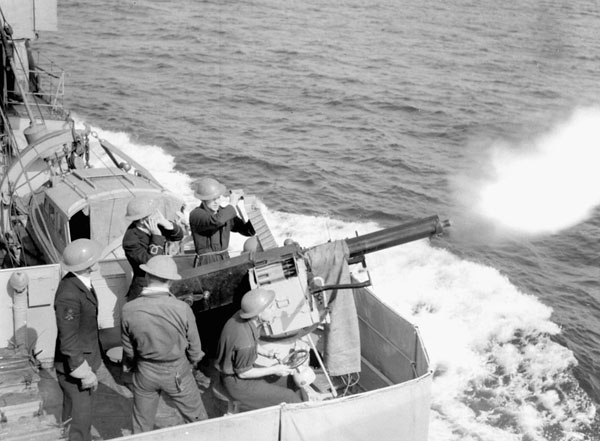
Unidentified personnel firing a two-pounder anti-aircraft gun aboard Assiniboine, which is escorting a troop convoy from Halifax to Britain, 10 July 1940.

The ship mounted four 45-calibre 4.7-inch Mark IX guns in single mounts, designated 'A', 'B', 'X', and 'Y' from front to rear. For anti-aircraft (AA) defence, Kempenfelt had a single QF 3-inch 20 cwt (Note: "cwt" is the abbreviation for hundredweight, 30 cwt referring to the nominal weight of the gun mounting, equivalent to 3,360 lb (1,520 kg).) AA gun between her funnels, and two 40-millimetre (1.6 in) QF 2-pounder Mk II AA guns mounted on the aft end of her forecastle deck. The 3-inch (76 mm) AA gun was removed in 1936 and the 2-pounders were relocated to between the funnels. She was fitted with two above-water quadruple torpedo tube mounts for 21-inch torpedoes. Three depth-charge chutes were fitted, each with a capacity of two depth charges. After World War II began this was increased to 33 depth charges, delivered by one or two rails and two throwers.

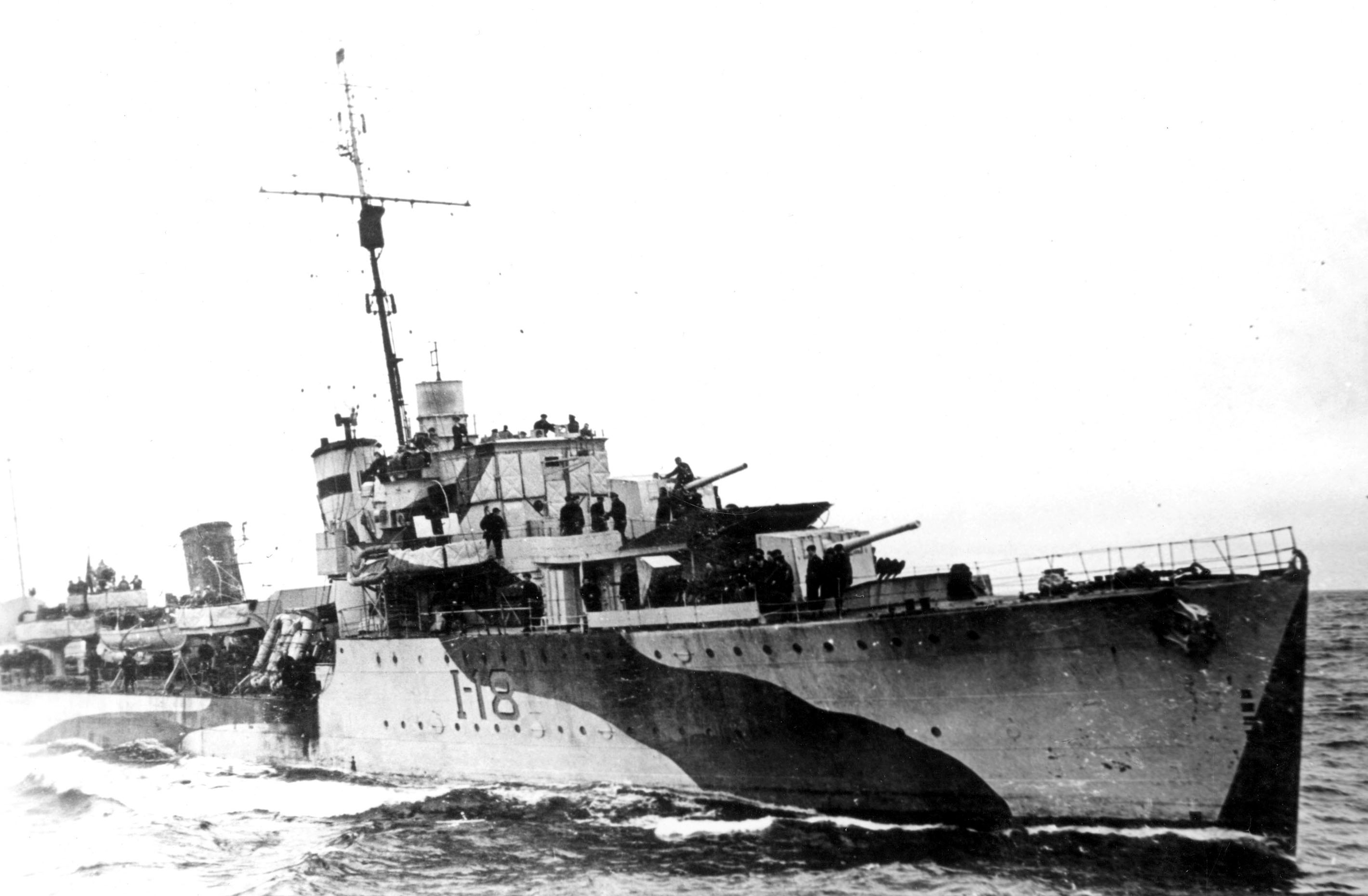
Late-war picture of Assiniboine. Note the cylindrical Type 271 radar above the bridge, the Hedgehog mortar shells to the right of 'A' gun and the 20 Oerlikon mount on the bridge wing.

The changes made to Assiniboine's armament during the war (dates can only be roughly assigned) were first the replacement of the ship's rear torpedo tube mount by a 12-pounder AA gun and the 2-pounders were exchanged for quadruple Mark I mounts for the QF 0.5-inch Vickers Mk III machine gun. Later, 'Y' gun was also removed to allow her depth charge stowage to be increased to at least 60 depth charges. 'X' gun was later removed and the 12-pounder was resited in its place to further increase her depth charge capacity. Later changes included fitting a split Hedgehog anti-submarine spigot mortar on each side of 'A' gun, exchanging her two quadruple .50-calibre Vickers machine guns mounted between her funnels for two Oerlikon 20 mm AA guns, and the addition of two Oerlikon guns to her searchlight platform. The ship's director-control tower and rangefinder above the bridge were removed in exchange for a Type 271 target indication radar. A Type 286 short-range surface search radar was also added as was an HF/DF radio direction finder on a short mainmast.

The ship was ordered on 15 July 1930 from J. Samuel White at Cowes under the 1929 Programme. Kempenfelt was laid down on 18 October 1930, launched on 30 September 1931, as the second ship to carry the name, and completed on 30 May 1932. Built as a flotilla leader, she displaced 15 long tons more than the rest of her class and carried an extra 30 personnel. These personnel formed the staff of the Captain (D) of the flotilla.

== Service ==
Kempenfelt was assigned to the 2nd Destroyer Flotilla, of the Home Fleet, after her commissioning. The ship briefly mounted an experimental 5.1-inch (130 mm) gun on 'B' mount for evaluation purposes during this time; it was replaced by the standard 4.7-inch gun. She was based at Rosyth for most of the rest of 1932, but visited the Mediterranean between January and March 1933 before returning home. The ship was given a refit at Devonport that ended in January 1934. Shortly afterwards, Kempenfelt participated in the Home Fleet's tour of the West Indies that ended in March. The ship visited various Scandinavian ports during the remainder of the year. She participated in King George V's Silver Jubilee Fleet Review at Spithead on 16 July 1935. Following the Italian invasion of Abyssinia, Kempenfelt was sent in August to the Red Sea with the other ships of the 2nd Flotilla to monitor Italian warship movements until April 1936. She was given a brief refit at Devonport that lasted until June upon her return to the UK. During the first stages of the Spanish Civil War in late 1936, the ship evacuated British nationals from several different Spanish ports.

In December, Kempenfelt began a more thorough refit at Devonport that lasted until 10 April 1937 and returned to Spanish waters afterwards to intercept shipping carrying contraband goods to Spain and to protect British-flagged ships. On 6 March, the ship and the destroyer Boreas, rescued survivors from the Nationalist heavy cruiser Baleares after she was sunk by Republican destroyers during the Battle of Cape Palos. She was refitted at Chatham in May–June 1938 and made a number of port visits in Scandinavia the following month. Kempenfelt was transferred to the Portsmouth Local Flotilla and remained there until the war began in September 1939.

=== Wartime service and transfer ===
The ship was transferred to the 18th Destroyer Flotilla, based at the Isle of Portland, where she escorted shipping and conducted anti-submarine patrols. Kempenfelt was purchased before the war began by the Canadian government, but it agreed to allow the British to retain her until the Royal Navy could compensate for her loss by requisitioning enough auxiliary anti-submarine vessels. By the time that the British were ready to turn her over to the RCN, the ship was under repair after a collision and the hand over was delayed until 19 October. She was renamed Assiniboine and arrived at Halifax, Nova Scotia on 17 November. The ship was not fitted with the steam heating necessary to operate in a Canadian winter and she was transferred to the Caribbean in exchange for the destroyer HMCS Saguenay. Assiniboine arrived at Kingston, Jamaica, on 8 December.

Assigned to the North America and West Indies Station, the highlight of the ship's service in the Caribbean was the capture of the German blockade runner MV Hannover in the Mona Passage between the islands of Hispaniola and Puerto Rico on the night of 8/9 March 1940. Initially intercepted by the light cruiser Dunedin, the crew of Hannover disabled their steering gear and set the ship on fire. Assiniboine took the burning ship under tow to prevent her from entering the waters of the neutral Dominican Republic while the cruiser sprayed water on the fire. The two ships swapped roles in the morning and the destroyer put some of her crew aboard Hannover to help Dunedin's boarding party fight the fire while the cruiser towed the freighter to Kingston. Assiniboine arrived in Halifax on 31 March for a refit.

After the completion of her refit, the ship escorted local convoys in and around Halifax until 15 January 1941 when she was transferred to Greenock and assigned to the 10th Escort Group of the Mid-Ocean Escort Force that was based there. Assiniboine rescued survivors from SS Anchises on 28 February and was damaged in a collision with MV Lairdswood on 5 April. Her repairs were not completed until 22 May and she was transferred to St. John's, Newfoundland in June to reinforce escort forces in the Western Atlantic. In early August, Assiniboine, her sister HMCS Restigouche and the ex-American destroyer HMS Ripley, escorted the battleship HMS Prince of Wales to Placentia Bay where Prime Minister Winston Churchill met President Franklin Roosevelt for the first time.

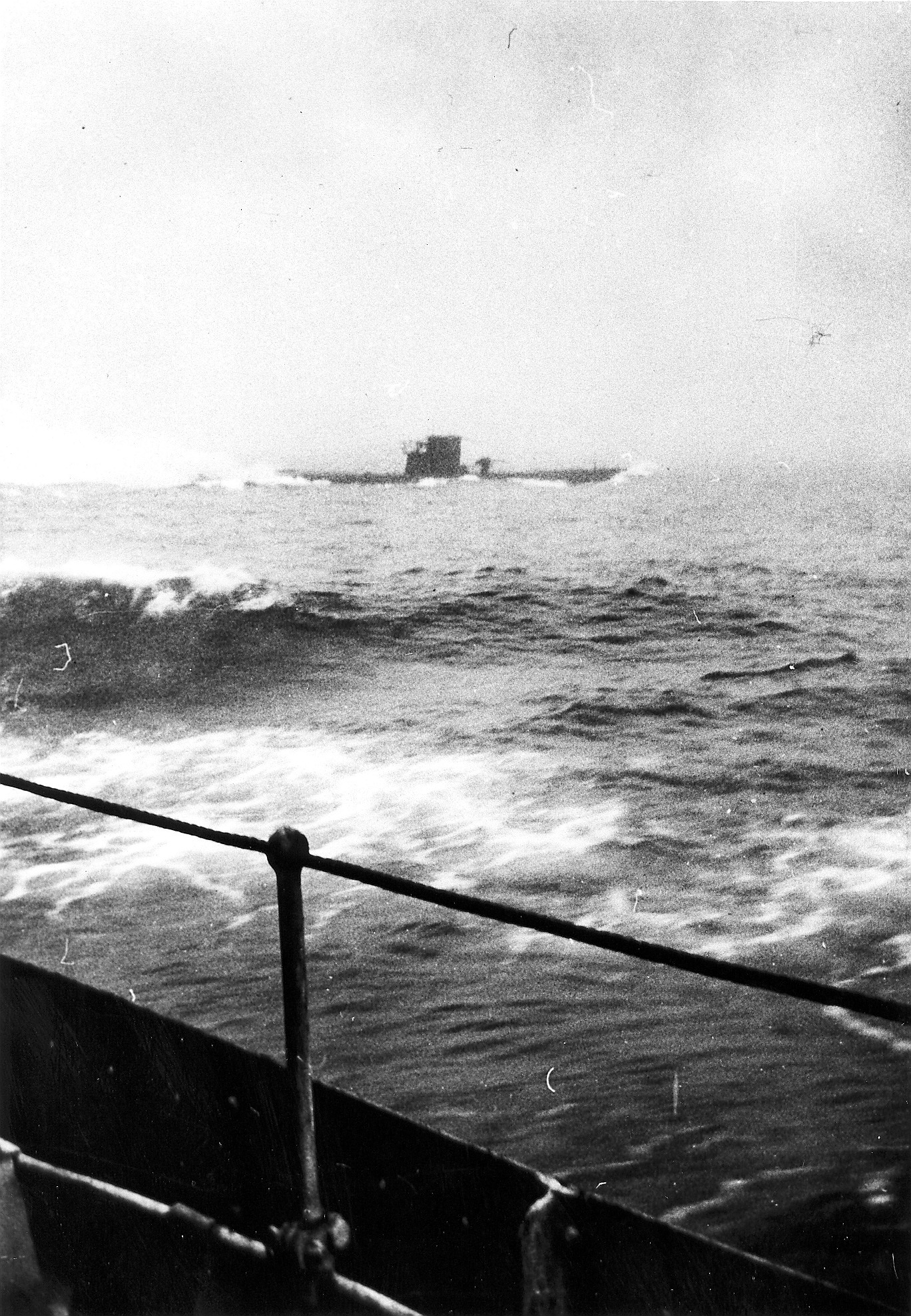
U-210 photographed from Assiniboine's deck, 6 August 1942

Whilst escorting Convoy SC 94 in early August 1942 as part of Escort Group C1, Assiniboine's Type 286 radar spotted U-210 in a heavy fog on 6 August. The destroyer closed on the contact and briefly spotted the submarine twice before losing her in the fog. The submarine reappeared crossing the destroyer's bow at a range of 50 yards (46 m), and both ships opened fire. The range was too close for Assiniboine's 4.7-inch guns to engage, but her .50-calibre machine guns shot up the submarine's deck and conning tower. This kept the Germans from manning their 88-millimetre (3.5 in) deck gun, but the 20-millimetre (0.79 in) flak gun was already manned and firing. The gun punched holes through the destroyer's plating that set some petrol tanks on the deck afire and disabled 'A' gun. It also claimed the only Canadian casualty during the engagement: Ordinary Seaman Kenneth "Wiley" Watson from Revelstoke, British Columbia. The destroyer was unable to ram U-210 until the rear 4.7-inch gun hit the conning tower, killing the entire bridge crew and the .50-caliber machine guns were able to silence the flak gun. This caused Lieutenant Sorber, the senior surviving officer, to order the submarine to dive, but this meant that she had to hold a straight course while doing so. Assiniboine was able to take advantage of this and rammed U-210 abaft the conning tower whilst she was diving. This caused the electric motors to fail, damaged her propellers and led to water entering the submarine, as a result of which Sorber ordered the ballast tanks to be blown and the submarine abandoned. The destroyer rammed her again when U-210 resurfaced, dropped a pattern of depth charges set to detonate at shallow depth and hit her one more time with a 4.7-inch shell before the submarine finally sank. A number of survivors were rescued by Assiniboine and the British corvette Dianthus, before the former ship departed for home for repairs as she was taking on water below the waterline. She required nearly two months of repairs at Halifax and was assigned to Escort Group C3 when they were completed on 20 December. Whilst en route to Londonderry, Assiniboine dropped a shallow pattern of depth charges on a submarine contact and badly damaged her stern on 2 March 1943. The ship was repaired at Liverpool between 7 March and 13 July and then assigned to Escort Group C1. She continued her escort work until April 1944 when she began a refit at Shelburne, Nova Scotia. Upon its completion in July, Assiniboine was assigned to the Western Approaches Command. The following month, the 12th Support Group, including Assiniboine, engaged three German minesweepers on 12 August, without sinking any. She remained in British waters for the rest of the war; the ship was damaged in a collision with SS Empire Bond on 14 February 1945 and was under repair until early March.

Assiniboine returned to Canada in June and was briefly used as a troop transport before a boiler room fire on 4 July effectively ended her career. She was paid off on 8 August and placed on the disposal list. Whilst on tow to the breakers in Baltimore, she ran aground near East Point, Prince Edward Island. Attempts to get her off failed, and she was left to rust until eventually being broken up in place in 1952.

=== Trans-Atlantic convoys escorted ===
Convoy	Escort Group	Dates	Notes
SC 62		30 Dec 1941-8 Jan 42	Newfoundland to Iceland
SC 69		13-23 Feb 1942	Newfoundland to Northern Ireland
ON 74		10–20 March 1942	Northern Ireland to Newfoundland
SC 77		3–12 April 1942	Newfoundland to Northern Ireland
ON 88		22 April-3 May 1942	Northern Ireland to Newfoundland
HX 189	MOEF group C1	14–20 May 1942	Newfoundland to Northern Ireland
ON 100	MOEF group C1	3–13 June 1942	Northern Ireland to Newfoundland
HX 195	MOEF group C1	24 June-1 July 1942	Newfoundland to Northern Ireland
ON 112	MOEF group C1	14–25 July 1942	Northern Ireland to Newfoundland
Convoy SC 94	MOEF group C1	2-6 Aug 1942	Newfoundland to Northern Ireland
HX 221	MOEF group C3	5-13 Jan 1943	Newfoundland to Northern Ireland
ON 163	MOEF group C3	25 Jan-8 Feb 1943	Northern Ireland to Newfoundland
ON 195		1-8 Aug 1943	Northern Ireland to Newfoundland
HX 252		20-27 Aug 1943	Newfoundland to Northern Ireland
ON 201		10-18 Sept 1943	Northern Ireland to Newfoundland
HX 258		28 Sept-5 Oct 1943	Newfoundland to Northern Ireland
ON 207		19-28 Oct 1943	Northern Ireland to Newfoundland
HX 264		6-16 Nov 1943	Newfoundland to Northern Ireland
ON 213		28 Nov-7 Dec 1943	Northern Ireland to Newfoundland
HX 270		15-25 Dec 1943	Newfoundland to Northern Ireland
ON 219		9-20 Jan 1944	Northern Ireland to Newfoundland
HX 276		28 Jan-6 Feb 1944	Newfoundland to Northern Ireland
ON 224		15-26 Feb 1944	Northern Ireland to Newfoundland
SC 154		2–15 March 1944	Newfoundland to Northern Ireland
ONS 32		29 March-13 April 1944	Northern Ireland to Newfoundland
