= Dashwood Fowler Moir =

Royal Navy admiral (1880-1942)

Vice-Admiral Dashwood Fowler Moir DSO (16 August 1880 – 8 August 1942) was a British commander serving with distinction in the Royal Navy in both World Wars who was killed whilst escorting North Atlantic Convoy SC 94. He was one of the most senior Royal Navy officers to be killed in the Second World War.

== Life ==
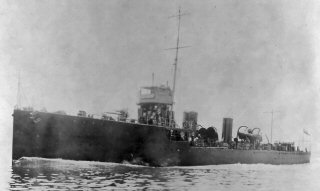
HMS Ariel

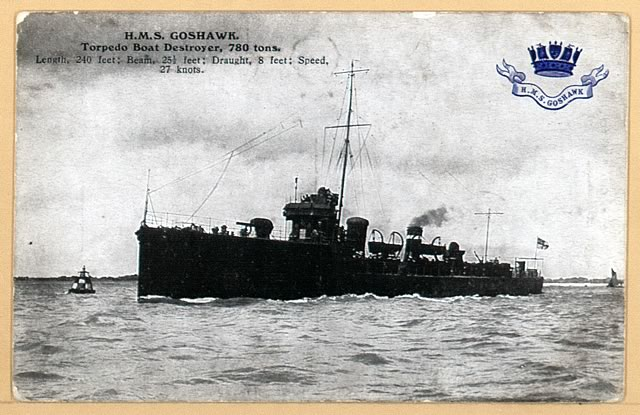
HMS Goshawk

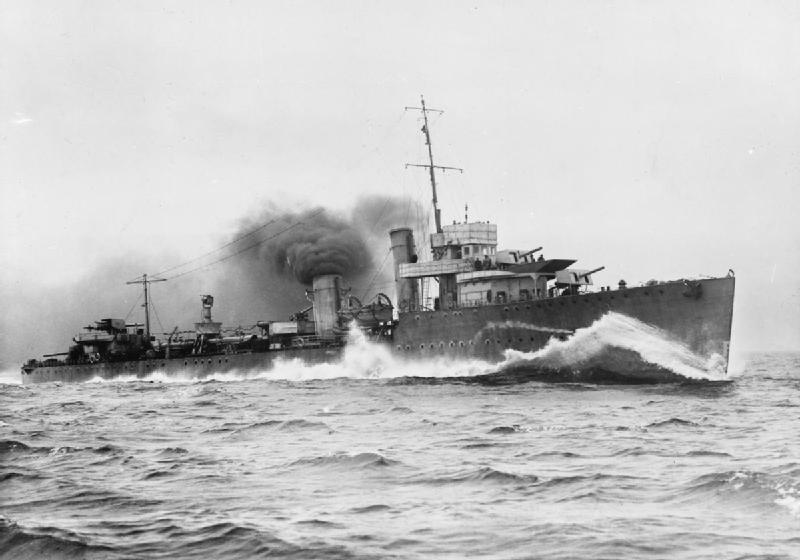
HMS Vimiera

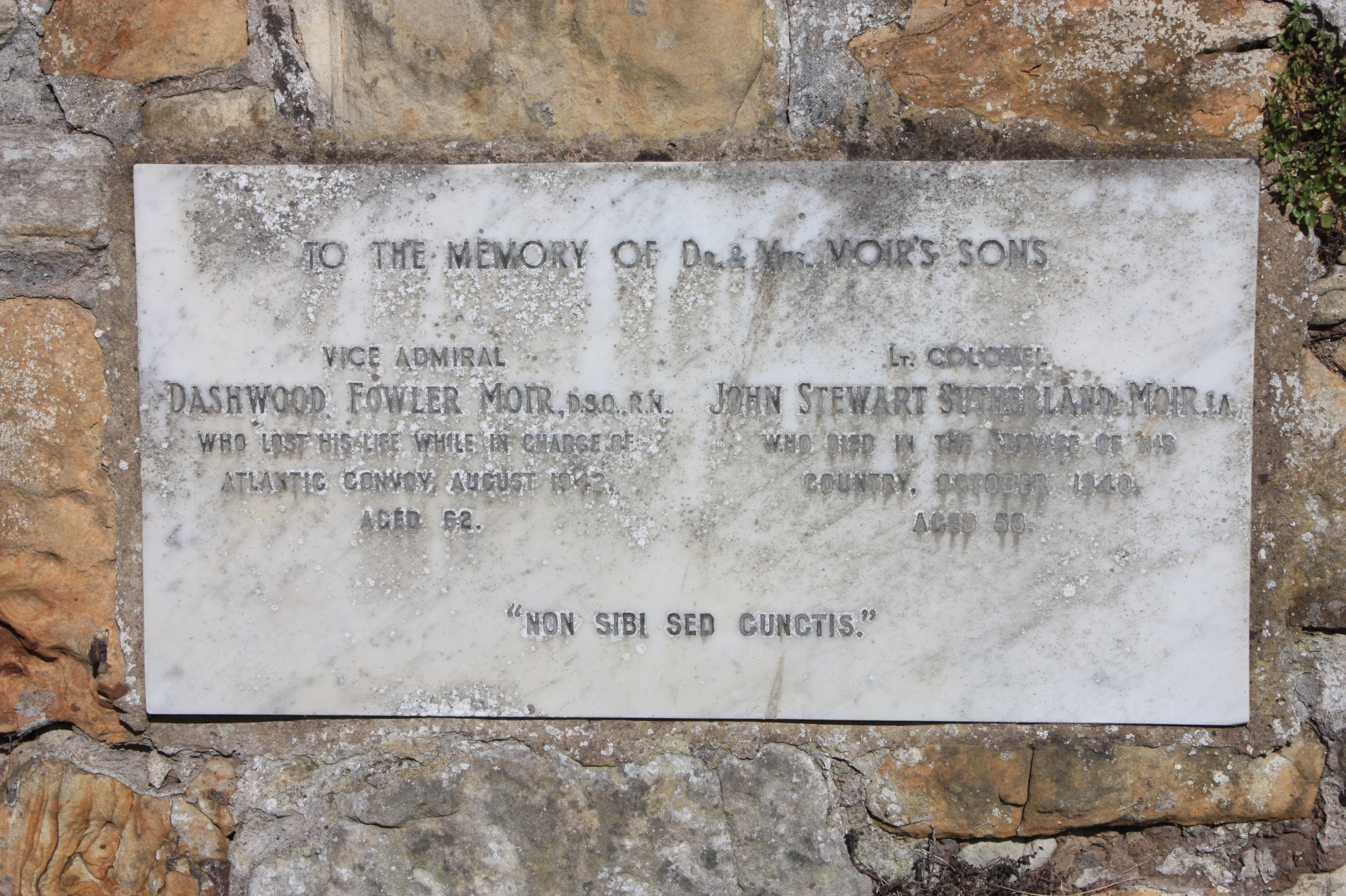
Memorial to Vice Admiral Dashwood Fowler Moir, St Andrews Cemetery

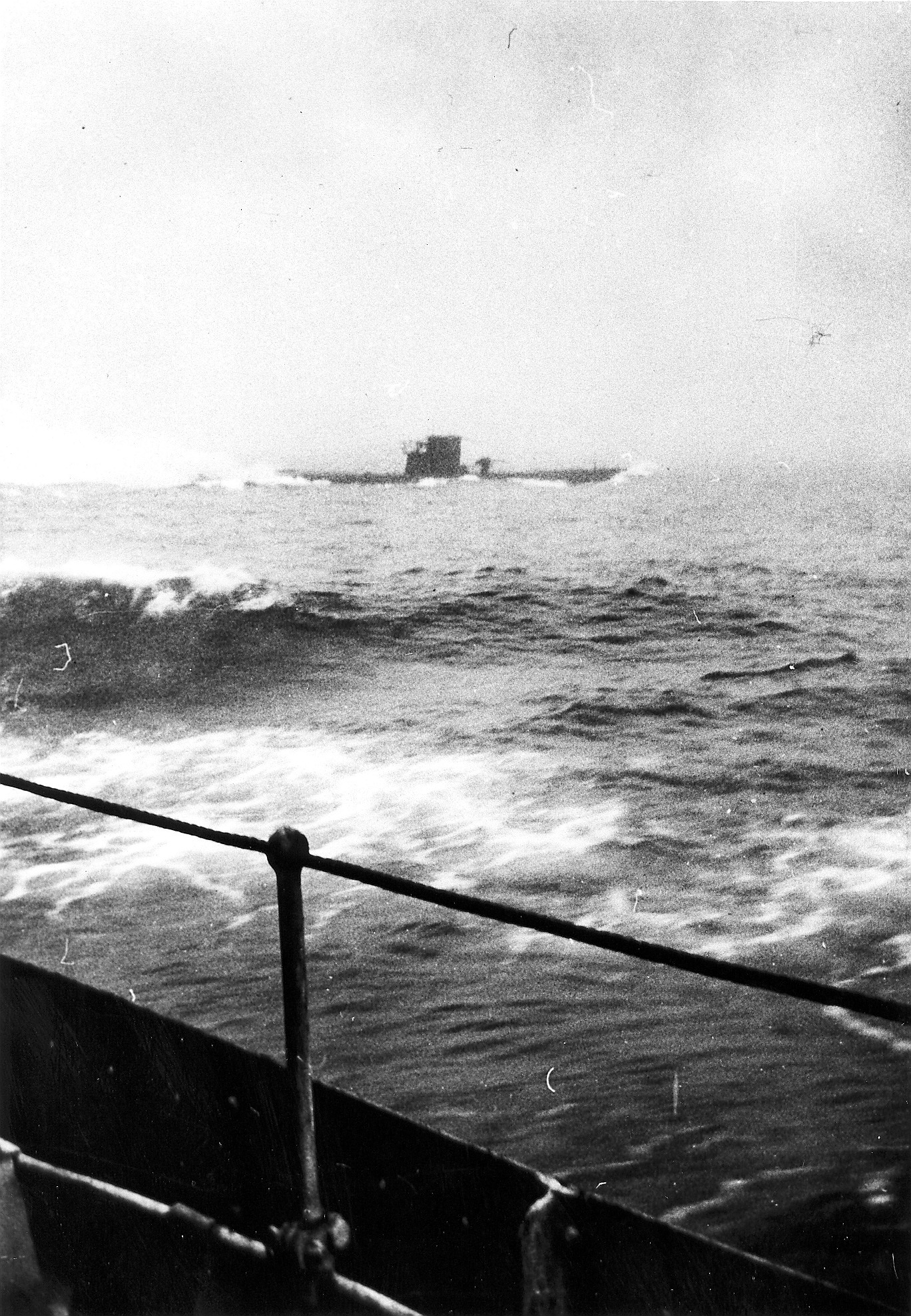
A U boat attacking convoy SC 94

He was born on 16 August 1880 in St Andrews in Scotland the son of Dr John Wilson Moir and his wife, Helen Alice Levine.

He joined the Royal Navy in July 1894, as soon as he left school. He was posted to South Africa during the Second Boer War.

In 1902 he was involved in an expedition along the River Niger in HMS Thrush and was promoted to Lieutenant in June of that year. In 1907 he was placed in charge of HMS TB 7. He became Lieutenant Commander in 1910. In 1912 he became captain of HMS Ariel. He was promoted to commander in 1914. Moir and the Ariel saw action at the Battle of Dogger Bank and Battle of Heligoland Bight.

In October 1914 he transferred to command the destroyer HMS Goshawk, and saw action at the Battle of Jutland at which he was also commander of the First Destroyer Flotilla. He was Mentioned in Dispatches following the battle. In 1917 he was given command of the new destroyer HMS Vimiera and in July 1918 moved to HMS Valhalla. In March 1918 he was awarded the Distinguished Service Order.

He left Valhalla in January 1919 and was promoted to captain in June 1919. In December 1920 he commanded HMS Bruce at the head of the Fourth Destroyer Flotilla. In 1921 he moved to HMS Mackay (a Submarine tender).

In 1925/26 he was Flag Captain for the naval dockyards on Malta. In 1929 he took over HM Dockyards in Sheerness. In early 1931 he was given his final large ship: HMS Glorious an aircraft carrier on patrol in the Mediterranean.

On 19 July 1931 he was promoted to rear admiral but placed on the Retired List on the following day. Still on the Retired List he was promoted to vice admiral in 1936.

In the Second World War he was created Commodore (Second Class) in the Royal Navy Reserve in October 1941 and put on active duty supporting convoys at the rank of Commodore of Convoy. He successfully led Convoy ON 36 and Convoy HX 165.

Convoy SC 94 set off from Sydney Nova Scotia in July 1942. Moir acted as Commodore of the merchant fleet, and placed himself in the Trehata. The convoy was discovered by a "wolf pack" (group of German U-boats) and decimated. The Trehata was torpedoed and sunk by U-176 on 8 August 1942, near Cape Farewell on the Greenland coast. Moir was declared "missing presumed dead" on the following day.

He is memorialised on his parents grave in St Andrews Cemetery, south-east of St Andrews Cathedral.

He is also listed on the Liverpool Naval Memorial (panel 1, column 1).

== Family ==
In 1908 he married Ada Frances Margaret Muir Muirhead. They had three sons and one daughter. William David Moir died in Bo'ness aged only 9 months.

The family later lived at Brimpton near Reading.
