= German submarine U-379 =

German World War II submarine

History

Nazi Germany
- Name: U-379
- Ordered: 16 October 1939
- Builder: Howaldtswerke, Kiel
- Yard number: 10
- Laid down: 27 May 1940
- Launched: 15 October 1941
- Commissioned: 29 November 1941
- Fate: Sunk on 8 August 1942

General characteristics
- Class & type: Type VIIC submarine
- Displacement: 769 tonnes (757 long tons) surfaced; 871 t (857 long tons) submerged
- Length: 67.10 m (220 ft 2 in) o/a; 50.50 m (165 ft 8 in) pressure hull
- Beam: 6.20 m (20 ft 4 in) o/a; 4.70 m (15 ft 5 in) pressure hull
- Draught: 4.74 m (15 ft 7 in)
- Installed power: 2,800–3,200 PS (2,100–2,400 kW; 2,800–3,200 bhp) (diesels); 750 PS (550 kW; 740 shp) (electric)
- Propulsion: 2 shafts; 2 × diesel engines; 2 × electric motors
- Speed: 17.7 knots (32.8 km/h; 20.4 mph) surfaced; 7.6 knots (14.1 km/h; 8.7 mph) submerged
- Range: 8,500 nmi (15,700 km; 9,800 mi) at 10 knots (19 km/h; 12 mph) surfaced; 80 nmi (150 km; 92 mi) at 4 knots (7.4 km/h; 4.6 mph) submerged
- Test depth: 230 m (750 ft); Crush depth: 250–295 m (820–968 ft)
- Complement: 4 officers, 40–56 enlisted
- Armament: 5 × 53.3 cm (21 in) torpedo tubes (four bow, one stern); 14 × torpedoes; 1 × 8.8 cm (3.46 in) deck gun (220 rounds); 1 x 2 cm (0.79 in) C/30 AA gun

Service record
- Part of: 8th U-boat Flotilla; 29 November 1941 – 30 June 1942; 1st U-boat Flotilla; 1 July – 8 August 1942
- Identification codes: M 42 090
- Commanders: K.Kapt. Paul-Hugo Kettner; 29 November 1941 – 8 August 1942
- Operations: 1 patrol: 25 June – 8 August 1942
- Victories: 2 merchant ships sunk (8,904 GRT)

German submarine U-379 was a Type VIIC U-boat built for Nazi Germany's Kriegsmarine for service during World War II. She was laid down on 27 May 1940 by Howaldtswerke, Kiel as yard number 10, launched on 15 October 1941 and commissioned on 29 November 1941 under Kapitänleutnant Paul-Hugo Kettner.

== Design ==
German Type VIIC submarines were preceded by the shorter Type VIIB submarines. U-379 had a displacement of 769 tonnes (757 long tons) when at the surface and 871 tonnes (857 long tons) while submerged. She had a total length of 67.10 m (220 ft 2 in), a pressure hull length of 50.50 m (165 ft 8 in), a beam of 6.20 m (20 ft 4 in), a height of 9.60 m (31 ft 6 in), and a draught of 4.74 m (15 ft 7 in). The submarine was powered by two Germaniawerft F46 four-stroke, six-cylinder supercharged diesel engines producing a total of 2,800 to 3,200 metric horsepower (2,060 to 2,350 kW; 2,760 to 3,160 shp) for use while surfaced, two Garbe, Lahmeyer & Co. RP 137/c double-acting electric motors producing a total of 750 metric horsepower (550 kW; 740 shp) for use while submerged. She had two shafts and two 1.23 m (4 ft) propellers. The boat was capable of operating at depths of up to 230 metres (750 ft).

The submarine had a maximum surface speed of 17.7 knots (32.8 km/h; 20.4 mph) and a maximum submerged speed of 7.6 knots (14.1 km/h; 8.7 mph). When submerged, the boat could operate for 80 nautical miles (150 km; 92 mi) at 4 knots (7.4 km/h; 4.6 mph); when surfaced, she could travel 8,500 nautical miles (15,700 km; 9,800 mi) at 10 knots (19 km/h; 12 mph). U-379 was fitted with five 53.3 cm (21 in) torpedo tubes (four fitted at the bow and one at the stern), fourteen torpedoes, one 8.8 cm (3.46 in) SK C/35 naval gun, 220 rounds, and a 2 cm (0.79 in) C/30 anti-aircraft gun. The boat had a complement of between forty-four and sixty.

== Service history ==
The boat's career began with training at 8th U-boat Flotilla on 29 November 1941, followed by active service on 1 July 1942 as part of the 1st Flotilla for the remainder of her short career.

In one patrol she sank two merchant ships, for a total of 8,904 gross register tons (GRT).

=== Convoy SC 94 ===
On the calm and sunny afternoon of 8 August 1942, U-379 attacked and sunk two merchant ships of Convoy SC 94, which was Eastbound from Nova Scotia to Liverpool, first US freighter Kaimoku, swiftly followed by the British freighter Anneberg.

However, later the same day, U-379 was spotted on the surface together with U-176 exchanging information. RN corvette HMS Dianthus gave chase firing her guns at the surfaced U-boat as she desperately dived. HMCS Chilliwack joined HMS Dianthus making a thorough ASDIC sweep but found nothing, so HMCS Chilliwack rejoined the convoy.

HMS Dianthus remained in the area and tried one last sweep and spotted U-379 again on the surface in the darkness attempting to slink away. She fired off a spread of depth charges forcing the now submerged U-boat to the surface. Dianthus opened up with all her guns and prepared to ram, catching the U-boat a glancing blow forward of the conning tower. U-379 finally sank after being rammed four times.

=== Wolfpacks ===
U-379 took part in two wolfpacks, namely:

- Wolf (13 July – 1 August 1942)
- Steinbrinck (3 – 8 August 1942)

=== Fate ===
U-379 was sunk on 8 August 1942 in the North Atlantic southeast of Cape Farewell, Greenland, in position 57°11′N 30°57′W, by ramming and depth charges from the Royal Navy corvette Dianthus. There were 40 dead and 5 survivors.

== Summary of raiding history ==
Date	Ship Name	Nationality	Tonnage (GRT)	Fate
8 August 1942	Anneberg	United Kingdom	2,537	Sunk
8 August 1942	Kaimoku	United States	6,367	Sunk

== Bibliography ==
- Busch, Rainer; Röll, Hans-Joachim (1999). German U-boat commanders of World War II : a biographical dictionary. Translated by Brooks, Geoffrey. London, Annapolis, Md: Greenhill Books, Naval Institute Press. ISBN 1-55750-186-6.
- Busch, Rainer; Röll, Hans-Joachim (1999). Deutsche U-Boot-Verluste von September 1939 bis Mai 1945 [German U-boat losses from September 1939 to May 1945]. Der U-Boot-Krieg (in German). Vol. IV. Hamburg, Berlin, Bonn: Mittler. ISBN 3-8132-0514-2.
- Edwards, Bernard (1996). Dönitz and the Wolf Packs - The U-boats at War. pp. 91, 95–97. ISBN 0-304-35203-9.
- Gröner, Erich; Jung, Dieter; Maass, Martin (1991). U-boats and Mine Warfare Vessels. German Warships 1815–1945. Vol. 2. Translated by Thomas, Keith; Magowan, Rachel. London: Conway Maritime Press. ISBN 0-85177-593-4.
- Sharpe, Peter (1998). U-Boat Fact File. Great Britain: Midland Publishing. ISBN 1-85780-072-9.
