= Ravelston (disambiguation) =

Ravelston is a suburb of Edinburgh, Scotland.

Ravelston may also refer to:

- SS Ravelston, a steamship
- Ravelston Corporation, a Canadian company
