= German submarine U-595 =

German World War II submarine

History

Nazi Germany
- Name: U-595
- Ordered: 16 January 1940
- Builder: Blohm & Voss, Hamburg
- Yard number: 571
- Laid down: 4 January 1941
- Launched: 17 September 1941
- Commissioned: 6 November 1941
- Fate: Sunk on 14 November 1942 in the Mediterranean in position 36°38′N 00°30′E, by depth charges from RAF Hudson bombers.

General characteristics
- Class & type: Type VIIC submarine
- Displacement: 769 tonnes (757 long tons) surfaced; 871 t (857 long tons) submerged
- Length: 67.10 m (220 ft 2 in) o/a; 50.50 m (165 ft 8 in) pressure hull
- Beam: 6.20 m (20 ft 4 in) o/a; 4.70 m (15 ft 5 in) pressure hull
- Draught: 4.74 m (15 ft 7 in)
- Installed power: 2,800–3,200 PS (2,100–2,400 kW; 2,800–3,200 bhp) (diesels); 750 PS (550 kW; 740 shp) (electric)
- Propulsion: 2 shafts; 2 × diesel engines; 2 × electric motors
- Speed: 17.7 knots (32.8 km/h; 20.4 mph) surfaced; 7.6 knots (14.1 km/h; 8.7 mph) submerged
- Range: 8,500 nmi (15,700 km; 9,800 mi) at 10 knots (19 km/h; 12 mph) surfaced; 80 nmi (150 km; 92 mi) at 4 knots (7.4 km/h; 4.6 mph) submerged
- Test depth: 230 m (750 ft); Crush depth: 250–295 m (820–968 ft)
- Complement: 4 officers, 40–56 enlisted
- Armament: 5 × 53.3 cm (21 in) torpedo tubes (4 bow, 1 stern); 14 × torpedoes or 26 TMA mines; 1 × 8.8 cm (3.46 in) deck gun (220 rounds); 1 x 2 cm (0.79 in) C/30 AA gun

Service record
- Part of: 8th U-boat Flotilla; 6 November 1941 – 31 July 1942; 9th U-boat Flotilla; 1 August – 14 November 1942
- Identification codes: M 38 801
- Commanders: Kptlt. Jürgen Quaet-Faslem; 6 November 1941 – 14 November 1942
- Operations: 3 patrols: 1st patrol: 23 July – 17 August 1942; 2nd patrol: 9 September – 6 October 1942; 3rd patrol: 31 October – 14 November 1942
- Victories: None

German submarine U-595 was a Type VIIC U-boat built for Nazi Germany's Kriegsmarine for service during World War II. She was laid down on 4 January 1941 by Blohm & Voss, Hamburg as yard number 571, launched on 17 September 1941 and commissioned on 6 November 1941 under Oberleutnant zur See Jürgen Quaet-Faslem.

== Design ==
German Type VIIC submarines were preceded by the shorter Type VIIB submarines. U-595 had a displacement of 769 tonnes (757 long tons) when at the surface and 871 tonnes (857 long tons) while submerged. She had a total length of 67.10 m (220 ft 2 in), a pressure hull length of 50.50 m (165 ft 8 in), a beam of 6.20 m (20 ft 4 in), a height of 9.60 m (31 ft 6 in), and a draught of 4.74 m (15 ft 7 in). The submarine was powered by two Germaniawerft F46 four-stroke, six-cylinder supercharged diesel engines producing a total of 2,800 to 3,200 metric horsepower (2,060 to 2,350 kW; 2,760 to 3,160 shp) for use while surfaced, two Brown, Boveri & Cie GG UB 720/8 double-acting electric motors producing a total of 750 metric horsepower (550 kW; 740 shp) for use while submerged. She had two shafts and two 1.23 m (4 ft) propellers. The boat was capable of operating at depths of up to 230 metres (750 ft).

The submarine had a maximum surface speed of 17.7 knots (32.8 km/h; 20.4 mph) and a maximum submerged speed of 7.6 knots (14.1 km/h; 8.7 mph). When submerged, the boat could operate for 80 nautical miles (150 km; 92 mi) at 4 knots (7.4 km/h; 4.6 mph); when surfaced, she could travel 8,500 nautical miles (15,700 km; 9,800 mi) at 10 knots (19 km/h; 12 mph). U-595 was fitted with five 53.3 cm (21 in) torpedo tubes (four fitted at the bow and one at the stern), fourteen torpedoes, one 8.8 cm (3.46 in) SK C/35 naval gun, 220 rounds, and a 2 cm (0.79 in) C/30 anti-aircraft gun. The boat had a complement of between forty-four and sixty.

== Service history ==
The boat's career began with training at 8th U-boat Flotilla on 6 November 1941, followed by active service on 1 August 1942 as part of the 9th Flotilla for the remainder of her service.

In three patrols she sank no ships.

=== Fate ===
U-595 was sunk on 14 November 1942 in the Mediterranean in position 36°38′N 00°30′E, by depth charges from two RAF Hudson bombers from 608 Squadron. The depth charges damaged her so badly that she had to surface, and the commander decided to beach her on the Algerian coast near Ténès. During the air attack the crew were able to damage some aircraft with machine-gun fire. There were 45 survivors and no casualties.

=== Wolfpacks ===
U-595 took part in five wolfpacks, namely:

- Steinbrinck (6 – 9 August 1942)
- Pfeil (12 – 22 September 1942)
- Blitz (22 – 26 September 1942)
- Tiger (26 – 30 September 1942)
- Delphin (4 – 14 November 1942)

== See also ==
- Mediterranean U-boat Campaign (World War II)
- Convoy SC 94

== Bibliography ==
- Busch, Rainer; Röll, Hans-Joachim (1999). German U-boat commanders of World War II : a biographical dictionary. Translated by Brooks, Geoffrey. London, Annapolis, Md: Greenhill Books, Naval Institute Press. ISBN 1-55750-186-6.
- Busch, Rainer; Röll, Hans-Joachim (1999). Der U-Boot-Krieg, 1939-1945: Deutsche U-Boot-Verluste von September 1939 bis Mai 1945 [German U-boat losses from September 1939 to May 1945] (in German). Vol. IV. Hamburg, Berlin, Bonn: Mittler. ISBN 3-8132-0514-2.
- Edwards, Bernard (1996). Dönitz and the Wolf Packs - The U-boats at War. p. 91. ISBN 0-304-35203-9.
- Gröner, Eric; Jung, Dieter; Maass, Martin (1991). German Warships 1815-1945: U-boats and Mine Warfare Vessels. Vol. 2. Translated by Thomas, Keith; Magowan, Rachel. London: Conway Maritime Press. ISBN 0-85177-593-4.
- Sharpe, Peter (1998). U-Boat Fact File. Great Britain: Midland Publishing. ISBN 1-85780-072-9.
