= Reiner Dierksen =

- Born: 24 March 1908; Esenshausen, Baden-Württemberg, German Empire
- Died: 15 May 1943 (aged 35); Gulf of Mexico, off Cuba
- Military career
- Allegiance: Nazi Germany
- Branch: Reichsmarine; Kriegsmarine
- Service years: 1933–43
- Rank: Korvettenkapitän
- Commands: U-176
- Conflicts: World War II
- Awards: Iron Cross 2nd Class, Minesweeper War Badge, Iron Cross 1st Class, U-boat War Badge 1939, German Cross in Gold

Reiner Dierksen (24 March 1908 – 15 May 1943) was a German U-boat commander in World War II and posthumous recipient of the German Cross in Gold.

== Naval career ==
Reiner Dierksen joined the Reichsmarine in 1933. From October 1938 to June 1940 he was Commander M 5 of the 1st Mineseweeping flotilla, then he was the Commander of the 32nd Minesweeping flotilla until March 1941. Dierksen began his U-boat training in March 1941, then took his U-boat Commander training and U-boat familiarization until 15 December 1941 when he commissioned the Type IXC U-176 at Bremen. On his second patrol with U-176 Dierksen ran into one of the most stubborn victims of the entire war when he spent almost 48 hours hunting the Dutch steam merchant, Polydorus, before finally sinking her with his 7th and 8th torpedoes.

Korvettenkapitän Reiner Dierksen died when his U-176 was sunk with all hands, 53 men, on its 3 war patrol north of Cuba on 15 May 1943 by Cuban patrol boat CS 13. Dierksen had sunk 10 ships with a total of 45,850 gross register tons (GRT) and one 7,457 GRT ship damaged.

== Death ==
On 15 May 1943, the Cuban merchant ship Camagüey, and the Honduran Hanks, both loaded with sugar, sailed from Sagua La Grande, bound for Havana, escorted by the Cuban submarine chasers CS-11, CS-12, and CS-13. At 17:15 hours, a U.S. Navy Kingfisher aircraft from squadron VS-62 operating from Cuba spotted U-176 at 23°21′N 80°18′W and dropped a smoke float to mark her position about one and a half miles astern of the convoy. CS-13 located the U-boat with her sonar, attacked with depth charges and sank U-176.

== Summary of Career ==
=== Ships attacked ===
Date	Ship	Nationality	Tonnage	Fate
4 August 1942	Richmond Castle	United Kingdom	7,798	Sunk
8 August 1942	Kelso	United Kingdom	3,956	Sunk
8 August 1942	Mount Kassion	Greece	7,914	Sunk
8 August 1942	Trehata	United Kingdom	4,817	Sunk
9 August 1942	Radchurch	United Kingdom	3,701	Sunk
25 August 1942	Empire Breeze	United Kingdom	7,457	Sunk
27 November 1942	Polydorus	Netherlands	5,922	Sunk
13 December 1942	Scania	Sweden	1,629	Sunk
16 December 1942	Observer	United Kingdom	5,881	Sunk
13 May 1943	Mambí	Cuba	1,983	Sunk
13 May 1943	Nickeliner	United States	2,249	Sunk

=== Awards ===
- Iron Cross 2nd Class
- Minesweeper War Badge
- Iron Cross 1st Class
- U-boat War Badge 1939
- German Cross in Gold (posthumous)

== Bibliography ==
- Busch, Rainer; Röll, Hans-Joachim (1999). German U-boat commanders of World War II : a biographical dictionary. Translated by Brooks, Geoffrey. London, Annapolis, Md: Greenhill Books, Naval Institute Press. ISBN 1-55750-186-6.
