= Operation Terminal =

1942 Allied military operation during the Second World War

- Part of Operation Torch of World War II
Date	8 November 1942
Location	Algiers, Algeria
Result	Vichy French victory

Belligerents
United States; United Kingdom	Vichy France

Commanders and leaders
(United States) Col. E Swenson (United Kingdom) Henry S.J. Fancourt	(Vichy France) Jacques H. Moreau

Strength
2 destroyers 622 troops	5th company of 13ème Régiment de Tirailleurs Sénégalais; Coastal defense units Armored cars from 5th Régiment de Chasseurs d'Afrique

Casualties and losses
1 destroyer sunk 22 killed, 55 wounded All landed infantry captured	Unknown

Operation Terminal was an Allied operation during World War II. Part of Operation Torch (the Allied invasion of French North Africa, 8 November 1942) it involved a direct landing of infantry into the Vichy French port of Algiers with the intention of capturing the port facilities before they could be destroyed.

== Background ==
The attacking forces were two Royal Navy destroyers, HMS Malcolm and HMS Broke (commanded by Henry Fancourt) carrying 600 troops of the 3d Battalion, 135th Infantry, (commanded by Colonel Edwin Swenson), part of the US 34th Infantry Division, of which at least 250 were US Army Rangers of the First Ranger Battalion. The plan was to land the troops directly into the port. It was hoped that either complete surprise would be achieved or that the defenders would support the invasion to the extent at least of refusing to fire on the attackers. However the Vichy forces opened fire on the ships, damaging them heavily.

== Action ==
At 4.00 am on the morning of 8 November 1942 Malcolm and Broke approached Algiers Harbour. They were regarded as hostile by the defending Vichy troops, who opened fire at 4.06 am. Malcolm tried to break through the boom but was hit and severely damaged by a shell fired from the shore. Ten of her crew were dead, many more were injured and three of her four boilers were extinguished, cutting her speed to 4 knots. She was forced to retreat and played no further part in the operation. Initially, Broke had better luck. On her third attempt, she sliced through the boom and deposited her troops under fire on the Quai de Fécamp, and then retreated. This was four hours after the operation had started. Broke's luck ran out as she withdrew; she was hit by shore batteries which compounded on earlier damage and after being taken in tow, she sank on 10 November.

The landed infantry were surrounded and forced to surrender seven hours later. However they succeeded in preventing the destruction of the port before the defenders in turn surrendered to the larger invading forces.

== Aftermath ==
A similar operation was carried out at Oran (Operation Reservist), but with even less success; however the Torch landings as a whole were successful, the Terminal and Reservist segments being the only setbacks in the entire operation.

== See also ==
- HMS Malcolm (D19)
- HMS Broke (D83)
- List of equipment of the United States Army during World War II
- List of French military equipment of World War II
- Attack on Mers-el-Kébir
