= German submarine U-210 =

German World War II submarine

Coordinates: 54°24′N 34°37′W

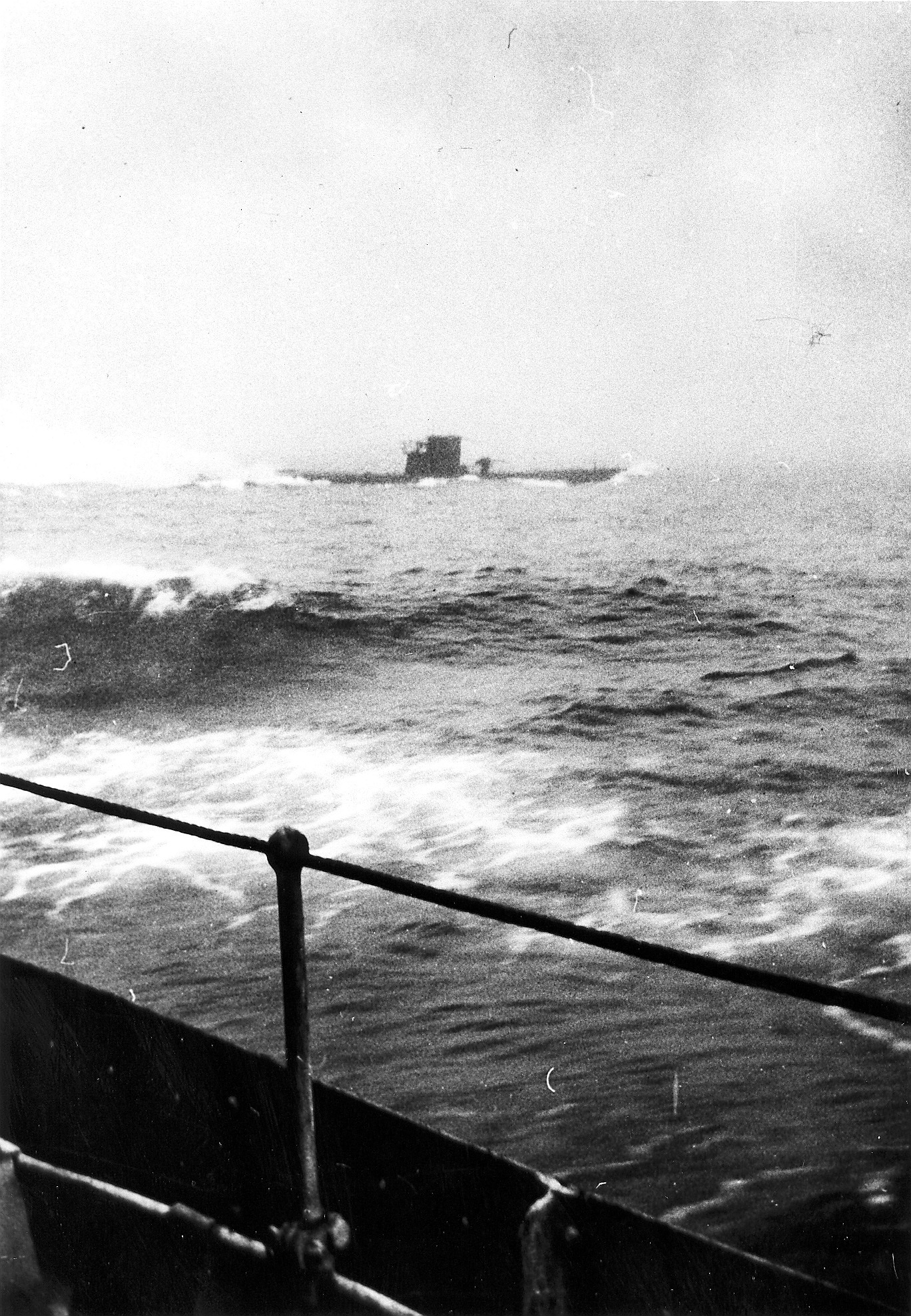
- U-210 – taken from the deck of HMCS Assiniboine on 6 August 1942, just before she was rammed by the destroyer

History

Nazi Germany
- Name: U-210
- Ordered: 16 October 1939
- Builder: Germaniawerft, Kiel
- Yard number: 639
- Laid down: 15 March 1941
- Launched: 23 December 1941
- Commissioned: 21 February 1942
- Fate: Sunk, 6 August 1942

General characteristics
- Class & type: Type VIIC submarine
- Displacement: 769 tonnes (757 long tons) (surfaced); 871 t (857 long tons) (submerged)
- Length: 67.10 m (220 ft 2 in) (o/a); 50.50 m (165 ft 8 in) (pressure hull)
- Beam: 6.20 m (20 ft 4 in) (o/a); 4.70 m (15 ft 5 in) (pressure hull)
- Draught: 4.74 m (15 ft 7 in)
- Installed power: 2,800–3,200 PS (2,100–2,400 kW; 2,800–3,200 bhp) (diesels); 750 PS (550 kW; 740 shp) (electric)
- Propulsion: 2 shafts; 2 × diesel engines; 2 × electric motors
- Speed: 17.7 knots (32.8 km/h; 20.4 mph) (surfaced); 7.6 knots (14.1 km/h; 8.7 mph) (submerged)
- Range: 8,500 nmi (15,700 km; 9,800 mi) at 10 knots (19 km/h; 12 mph) (surfaced); 80 nmi (150 km; 92 mi) at 4 knots (7.4 km/h; 4.6 mph) (submerged)
- Test depth: 230 m (750 ft); Crush depth: 250–295 m (820–968 ft)
- Complement: 4 officers, 40–56 enlisted
- Armament: 5 × 53.3 cm (21 in) torpedo tubes (four bow, one stern); 14 × G7e torpedoes or 26 TMA mines; 1 × 8.8 cm (3.46 in) deck gun; AA guns (2 cm FlaK 30)

Service record
- Part of: 5th U-boat Flotilla; 21 February – 31 July 1942; 9th U-boat Flotilla; 1 – 6 August 1942
- Identification codes: M 37 894
- Commanders: K.Kapt. Rudolf Lemcke; 21 February – 6 August 1942
- Operations: 1 patrol: 18 July – 6 August 1942
- Victories: None

The German submarine U-210 was a Type VIIC U-boat that served with the Kriegsmarine during World War II. Laid down on 15 March 1941 as yard number 639 at F. Krupp Germaniawerft in Kiel, she was launched on 23 December and commissioned on 21 February 1942.

== Design ==
German Type VIIC submarines were preceded by the shorter Type VIIB submarines. U-210 had a displacement of 769 tonnes (757 long tons) when at the surface and 871 tonnes (857 long tons) while submerged. She had a total length of 67.10 m (220 ft 2 in), a pressure hull length of 50.50 m (165 ft 8 in), a beam of 6.20 m (20 ft 4 in), a height of 9.60 m (31 ft 6 in), and a draught of 4.74 m (15 ft 7 in). The submarine was powered by two Germaniawerft F46 four-stroke, six-cylinder supercharged diesel engines producing a total of 2,800 to 3,200 metric horsepower (2,060 to 2,350 kW; 2,760 to 3,160 shp) for use while surfaced, two AEG GU 460/8–27 double-acting electric motors producing a total of 750 metric horsepower (550 kW; 740 shp) for use while submerged. She had two shafts and two 1.23 m (4 ft) propellers. The boat was capable of operating at depths of up to 230 metres (750 ft).

The submarine had a maximum surface speed of 17.7 knots (32.8 km/h; 20.4 mph) and a maximum submerged speed of 7.6 knots (14.1 km/h; 8.7 mph). When submerged, the boat could operate for 80 nautical miles (150 km; 92 mi) at 4 knots (7.4 km/h; 4.6 mph); when surfaced, she could travel 8,500 nautical miles (15,700 km; 9,800 mi) at 10 knots (19 km/h; 12 mph). U-210 was fitted with five 53.3 cm (21 in) torpedo tubes (four fitted at the bow and one at the stern), fourteen torpedoes, one 8.8 cm (3.46 in) SK C/35 naval gun, 220 rounds, and a 2 cm (0.79 in) C/30 anti-aircraft gun. The boat had a complement of between forty-four and sixty.

== Service history ==
U-210 undertook a single war patrol, departing Kiel on 18 July 1942 under the command of Rudolf Lemcke and heading for the north central Atlantic Ocean. The patrol was uneventful until 6 August 1942, when Convoy SC 94 was located. Despite heavy fog, U-210 was spotted on radar by the Canadian destroyer Assiniboine. The U-boat nearly escaped into the fog but the destroyer suddenly reappeared a mere 50 yards (46 m) away as U-210 crossed its bow. Both ships opened fire; while the range was too close for the destroyer's main guns, machine gun fire shot up the bridge and conning tower, preventing use of the deck gun. As the destroyer passed astern, a shell from her rear battery hit the conning tower, killing the entire bridge crew; .50-caliber machine gun fire silenced the submarine's flak gun. The senior surviving officer of U-210 ordered her to dive, but forced a slow straight course which allowed Assiniboine to ram her just abaft the conning tower as she dove. This resulted in the submarine's electric motors failing and damage to the propellers. The ballast tanks were blown and the attacking destroyer rammed again as U-210 surfaced; a pattern of shallow-set depth charges was dropped at the same time. As the submarine sank, Assiniboine hit her with another 4.7-inch (119 mm) shell. 37 survivors were pulled from the water and became prisoners of war. Six men of her crew died during this battle.

=== Wolfpacks ===
U-210 took part in two wolfpacks, namely:

- Pirat (29 July – 3 August 1942)
- Steinbrinck (3 – 6 August 1942)

== Bibliography ==
- Bishop, Chris (2006). Kriegsmarine U-Boats, 1939–45. London: Amber Books. ISBN 978-1-904687-96-2.
- Busch, Rainer; Röll, Hans-Joachim (1999). German U-boat commanders of World War II : a biographical dictionary. Translated by Brooks, Geoffrey. London, Annapolis, Md: Greenhill Books, Naval Institute Press. ISBN 1-55750-186-6.
- Busch, Rainer; Röll, Hans-Joachim (1999). Deutsche U-Boot-Verluste von September 1939 bis Mai 1945 [German U-boat losses from September 1939 to May 1945]. Der U-Boot-Krieg (in German). Vol. IV. Hamburg, Berlin, Bonn: Mittler. ISBN 3-8132-0514-2.
- Edwards, Bernard (1996). Dönitz and the Wolf Packs – The U-boats at War. Cassell Military Classics. pp. 91, 93, 94. ISBN 0-304-35203-9.
- Gröner, Erich; Jung, Dieter; Maass, Martin (1991). U-boats and Mine Warfare Vessels. German Warships 1815–1945. Vol. 2. Translated by Thomas, Keith; Magowan, Rachel. London: Conway Maritime Press. ISBN 0-85177-593-4.
