= HMS Broke (D83) =

Destroyer of the Royal Navy

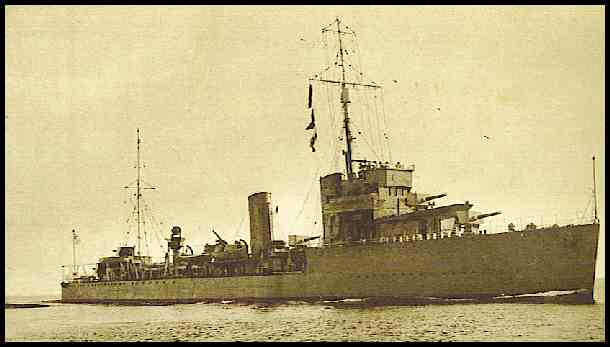
- HMS Broke

History

United Kingdom
- Name: HMS Broke
- Namesake: Philip Broke
- Ordered: April 1918
- Builder: John I. Thornycroft & Company
- Yard number: 983
- Laid down: October 1918
- Launched: 16 September 1920
- Commissioned: 15 April 1925
- Renamed: From Rooke, April 1921
- Fate: Sunk, 8 November 1942

General characteristics
- Class & type: Thornycroft type destroyer leader
- Displacement: 1,554 long tons (1,579 t) (standard); 2,009 long tons (2,041 t) (full load)
- Length: 329 ft (100 m) o/a; 318 ft 3 in (97.00 m) pp
- Beam: 31 ft 6 in (9.60 m)
- Draught: 12 ft 3 in (3.73 m)
- Installed power: 40,000 shp (30,000 kW)
- Propulsion: 2 × Brown-Curtiss single reduction steam turbines; 4 × Yarrow boilers; 2 × shafts
- Speed: 36.5 kn (42.0 mph; 67.6 km/h)
- Capacity: 500 short tons (450 t) fuel oil
- Complement: 164
- Armament: 5 × BL 4.7 in (120 mm) Mark I dual purpose gun, 1 × QF 3 inch 20 cwt anti-aircraft gun, 6 × 21 inch (533 mm) torpedo tubes (2 × 3)

Service record
- Part of: 4th Destroyer Flotilla
- Commanders: Henry Fancourt
- Operations: Operation Terminal

HMS Broke was a Thornycroft type flotilla leader of the Royal Navy. She was the second of four ships of this class that were ordered from J I Thornycroft in April 1918, and was originally named Rooke after Rear Admiral Sir George Rooke of the Dutch Wars and the Battle of Vigo Bay.

The naturalist Peter Scott, among the ship's crew in 1940, conducted experiments in ship camouflage, having the two sides of Broke painted in different patterns.

== Design and construction ==
The Thornycroft type or Shakespeare-class leaders were, like the similar and contemporary Admiralty type (also known as the Scott class), designed to meet a requirement from Admiral Sir John Jellicoe, commander of the Grand Fleet, for a large, fast and heavily armed flotilla leader to match and outclass rumoured large German destroyers.

The ships had a length of 329 ft 1 in (100.30 m) overall, 325 feet 3 inches (99.14 m) at the waterline and 318 ft 3 in (97.00 m) between perpendiculars, with a beam of 31 ft 6 in (9.60 m) and a draught of 12 ft 6 in (3.81 m). Design displacement was 1,530 long tons (1,555 t) normal and 1,900 long tons (1,900 t) full load. (Note: Conway's gives a legend displacement of 1,554 long tons (1,579 t) and a full load displacement of 2,009 long tons (2,041 t), while Lenton gives a normal displacement of 1,480 long tons (1,504 t) and a full load displacement of 2,080 long tons (2,113 t).) The ship's machinery consisted of four Yarrow boilers that fed steam at 250 pounds per square inch (1,700 kPa) to two sets of Brown-Curtis single-reduction geared steam turbines, rated at 40,000 shaft horsepower (30,000 kW). This gave a design speed of 36.5 knots (67.6 km/h; 42.0 mph) light, which corresponded to about 32.5 knots (60.2 km/h; 37.4 mph) at full load. Broke reached a maximum speed of 38 knots (70 km/h; 44 mph) during sea trials. Up to 500 tons of oil fuel could be carried, giving a range of 5,000 nautical miles (9,300 km; 5,800 mi) at 15 knots (28 km/h; 17 mph).

The class had a main gun armament of five 4.7 in (120 mm)/45 calibre BL Mark I guns, (Note: In British practice, BL (Breech Loading) indicated that a separate, bagged, charge was used.) on CP VI mountings capable of elevating to 30 degrees, arranged in two superfiring pairs fore and aft of the superstructure with the remaining gun positioned on a platform between the funnels. Anti-aircraft armament consisted of a single 3 in (76 mm) gun on a platform abaft the rear funnel together with a pair of single two-pounder (40mm) pom-pom autocannon on single mounts for close-in protection. Torpedo armament consisted of two triple mounts for 21-inch (533 mm) torpedo tubes between the 3-inch AA gun and the rear pair of 4.7-inch guns.

Four Shakespeare-class leaders (Keppel, Rooke, Saunders and Spragge) were ordered from Thornycroft in April 1918, as a follow-on to a pair of ships ordered in April 1916 and a third ordered in April 1917. (Note: Saunders and Spragge, along with two ships ordered from Cammell Laird, Barrington and Hughes, were cancelled after the end of the First World War before construction of these ships could begin.) Rooke, named after Admiral Sir George Rooke, was laid down at Thornycroft's Woolston, Hampshire shipyard in October 1918 and was launched on 16 September 1920. Her name was changed to Broke in April 1921, after Rear-Admiral Sir Philip Broke (/ˈbrʊk/). Broke was moved to the Royal Dockyard at Pembroke Dock for completion, but was not completed until 1925. She was commissioned on 15 April 1925. The ship's cost was £409,394.

== Operational history ==
=== 1925–1939 ===
After trials and workup, Broke was ordered to the Mediterranean, arriving at Malta on 9 February 1925 and replacing Montrose as leader of the 4th Destroyer Flotilla. She was refitted at Malta dockyard from May to August 1929 and again from November 1930 to March 1931. Broke left the 4th Flotilla and returned to British waters in April 1931, going into reserve at Devonport. While in reserve, she acted as tender to the Royal Naval Engineering College at Keyham, Plymouth until April 1932, and then served as Emergency destroyer at Devonport. In June 1935 Broke received a full crew, and was allocated as an independent command (i.e. not part of any flotilla) as part of the Reserve Fleet. She served as the flagship for the Rear Admiral (D) of the Reserve Fleet during the Royal Fleet Review in July 1935, before returning to local duties around Portsmouth. In October 1935, HMS Broke starred as the fictional "Second-class cruiser HMS Rutland" in the film Forever England based upon C. S. Forester's novel Brown on Resolution, with John Mills playing Able Seaman Brown in his first leading role.

Broke was refitted at Devonport from September 1936 to March 1937, having her boilers re-tubed. After completing the refit, Broke returned to reserve duties at Devonport, again acting as Emergency destroyer and as a tender for the Royal Naval Engineering College. On 2 September 1937 Broke was sent to investigate an SOS signal from the South African merchant ship Sherard Osborn in the Bay of Biscay. The captain of Sherard Osborn had sent the signal fearing an imminent mutiny owing to an overtime dispute and poor conditions aboard the ship, but intervention by Broke was not needed. On 20 November that year, Broke was damaged in a collision with the destroyer Witch and was under repair at Devonport from 31 December 1937 to 28 January 1938. She was temporarily brought forward into full commission later into 1938, replacing Codrington as leader while Codrington was being refitted. Broke returned to reserve in October 1938 and again underwent refit at Devonport from January to June 1939.

=== World War II ===
At the outbreak of war, Broke was part of the 29th Division, 15th Destroyer Flotilla, based at Rosyth. She was assigned to convoy protection duty, transferring to the Western Approaches Command at Plymouth in October. During this period, she escorted merchant ships on the north- and south-bound Gibraltar and South Atlantic routes. Broke's commanding officer, Lieutenant commander Richard Iwan Alexander Sarell, was awarded the Distinguished Service Order on 23 December 1939 for "successful actions against enemy submarines".

On 11 March 1940, Broke, together with the destroyers Wild Swan and Winchelsea, was ordered to investigate a submarine sighting south-west of Lands End, with Broke and Wild Swan being diverted to go to the aid of the Dutch tanker Eulota, which had been torpedoed by the German submarine U28. Broke scuttled Eulota's wreck after Wild Swan had rescued the tanker's crew. On 28 April 1940, Broke, which had transferred back to the North Sea earlier that month, ran aground on the Goodwin Sands, but was soon refloated. During May 1940, she underwent boiler repairs at Devonport. Although she missed the Dunkirk Evacuation owing to the boiler repairs, Broke took part in Operation Cycle, the evacuation of British and Allied troops from Le Havre and Saint-Valery-en-Caux in Normandy between 10 and 13 June. One of Broke's boats, commanded by the naturalist, artist and camoufleur Peter Scott, reconnoitered Saint-Valery-en-Caux's harbour on the night of 10/11 June and found that the troops from the 51st (Highland) Division which were planned to be evacuated that night had not yet reached the port, but were expected the next night. German attacks overran the British defences of Saint-Valery during the day, and while 1350 British and 930 French troops were evacuated from Saint-Valery and nearby beaches, including 55 brought back to Britain aboard Broke, about 8000 men of the 51st Highland Division were captured by the Germans. There were still large British forces in France, and from 15 June Operation Aerial began, evacuating British and allied troops and civilians from western France. Broke picked up 180 Polish troops and 20 British civilians from Brest, France on 18 June, landing them at Plymouth.

In July 1940, she joined 6th Escort Group, and returned to escort duty on the Gibraltar, South Atlantic, east- and west-bound North Atlantic routes. In this role, Broke was engaged in all the duties performed by escort ships: protecting convoys, searching for and attacking U-boats which attacked ships in convoy, and rescuing survivors. She operated in this role the next two and a half years. During this time, she escorted 30 north–south convoys, two of which were attacked. Peter Scott was still a member of the ship's crew in July 1940 and he had the ship experimentally camouflaged, differently on the two sides. To starboard, the ship was painted blue-grey all over, but countershaded with white in naturally shadowed areas. To port, the ship was painted in "bright pale colours" to combine some disruption of shape with the ability to fade out during the night, again with shadowed areas painted white.

She also escorted 27 east–west convoys, seven of which were attacked. From January to March 1941, Broke was refitted by Harland & Wolff at their London yard, with additional stiffening being fitted. On 6 April 1941, (Note: Kemp says 4 April.) the Armed Merchant Cruiser Comorin, on passage to Freetown with the steamer Glenartney, and the destroyer Lincoln caught fire in the North Atlantic. The fires could not be contained and Comorin had to be abandoned. Broke, in the vicinity, was called to assist and together with Lincoln and Glenartney rescued the survivors of the Armed Merchant Cruiser, with Broke remaining on the leeward quarter of Comorin for three hours in a gale to pick up survivors, picking up 180 men before scuttling Comorin with a torpedo. In total 405 men were rescued by the three ships, with 20 killed. On 26 July 1941, while escorting the convoy SL 80, Broke collided with the destroyer Verity near Derry. Both ships were damaged, with Broke having a badly damaged bow which required repair by Palmers at their Hebburn yard from 8 August to 12 September, while Verity was under repair by Harland & Wolff at Belfast until 22 September that year.

After repair, Broke returned to the 6th Escort Group, by now based at Londonderry Port. In October 1941, Broke formed part of the escort for Convoy ONS 29. On 15 January 1942, Broke suffered engine problems, with her starboard engine out of action and her port engine also suffering defects, and she was under refit at Portsmouth between 1 February 1942 and 25 July that year. Broke was converted to a short-range escort while under refit. When Broke emerged in July 1942, three 4.7 inch guns were removed, to be replaced by a Hedgehog anti-submarine projector and six 20 mm Oerlikon cannon, with Type 272 radar and HF/DF also fitted. Broke was involved in one major battle on the North Atlantic route in August 1942; when convoy SC 94 was attacked. SC 94 saw 11 ships sunk and two U-boats destroyed in a six-day running battle; Broke joined the escort on 9 August, her commander, Arthur Layard, assuming command for the last three days of the battle. Although attacked by the U-boat U-595, the U-boat's torpedoes missed and Broke was undamaged.

On 8 November 1942, Broke, together with the destroyer Malcolm, took part in Operation Terminal, part of Operation Torch, the Allied invasion of French North Africa. In "Terminal", the two destroyers, which were under the overall command of Captain Henry Fancourt, (Note: While Fancourt was in overall control of the two destroyers, and was aboard Broke during "Terminal", Arthur Layard remained Broke's captain.) were to attempt to land infantry directly onto the portside in Algiers in the hope of capturing the port facilities and preventing their destruction by the Vichy French forces. It was hoped that either complete surprise would be achieved or that the defenders would support the invasion to the extent at least of refusing to fire on the attackers. However, the Vichy forces opened fire on the ships, damaging them heavily. Malcolm was forced to withdraw, but Broke had better luck. On her third attempt, she sliced through the boom and succeeded in landing her troops under fire on the Quai de Fécamp, four hours after the operation started. Broke continued to receive heavy fire and was forced to withdraw at 10:30. When withdrawing Broke was again hit by shore batteries, which compounded earlier damage. She was taken in tow by the destroyer Zetland, but sank two days later on 10 November at position 36.50°N 00.40°E.

== Battle honours ==
During her service Broke was awarded four battle honours:

- North Sea 1939
- Atlantic 1939-42
- Arctic 1942
- North Africa 1942

== Pennant numbers ==
Pennant number	From	To
D83	December 1924	1940
I83	1940	1942
