= HMS Dianthus (K95) =

Flower-class corvette

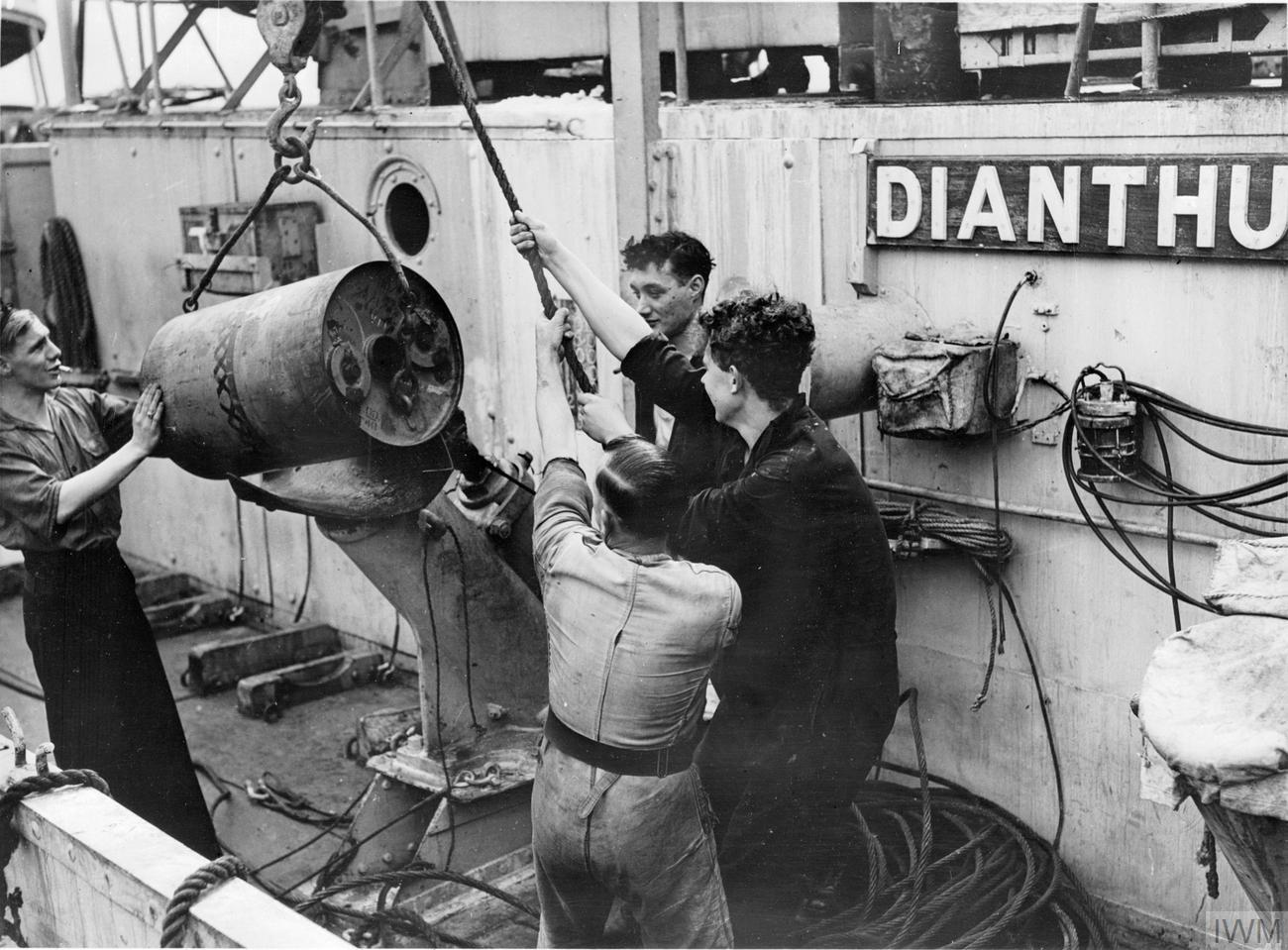
- A depth charge being loaded onto a depth-charge thrower aboard the corvette HMS Dianthus on 14 August 1942

History

United Kingdom
- Builder: Henry Robb Ltd.
- Laid down: 31 October 1939
- Launched: 9 July 1940
- Commissioned: 17 March 1941
- Out of service: May 1947
- Fate: Scrapped 1969

General characteristics
- Class & type: Flower-class corvette
- Displacement: 925 long tons (940 t; 1,036 short tons)
- Length: 205 ft (62.48 m)o/a
- Beam: 33 ft (10.06 m)
- Draught: 11.5 ft (3.51 m)
- Propulsion: single shaft; 2 × water tube boilers; 1 × 4-cycle triple-expansion reciprocating steam engine; 2,750 ihp (2,050 kW)
- Speed: 16 knots (29.6 km/h)
- Range: 3,500 nautical miles (6,482 km) at 12 knots (22.2 km/h)
- Complement: 85
- Armament: 1 × 4 inch BL Mk.IX single gun; 2 × Vickers .50 machine guns (twin); 2 × .303 inch Lewis machine gun (twin); 2 × Mk.II depth charge throwers; 2 × Depth charge rails with 40 depth charges

HMS Dianthus was a Flower-class corvette of the Royal Navy. She was launched on 9 July 1940 from the Leith Docks on the Firth of Forth and named after the genus of flowering plants including Carnation, Pink, and Sweet William. The ship escorted trade convoys between Newfoundland and the Western Approaches through the Battle of the Atlantic wolf pack attacks of the winter of 1942–43.

== Background ==
Flower-class corvettes like Dianthus serving with the Royal Navy during World War II were different to earlier and more traditional sail-driven corvettes. The "corvette" designation was created by the French in the 19th century as a class of small warships; the Royal Navy borrowed the term for a period but discontinued its use in 1877. During the hurried preparations for war in the late 1930s, Winston Churchill reactivated the corvette class, needing a name for smaller ships used in an escort capacity, in this case based on a whaling ship design. The generic name "flower" was used to designate the class of these ships, which – in the Royal Navy – were named after flowering plants.

== War duty ==
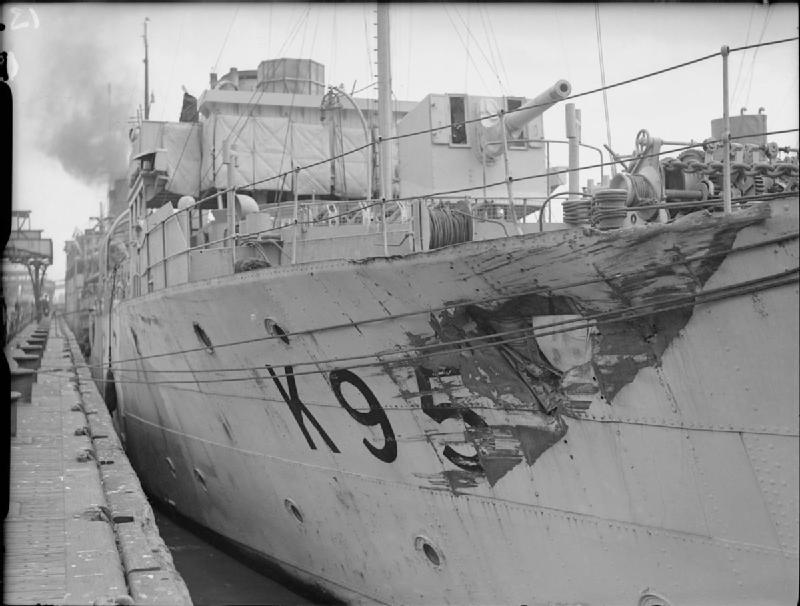
Bow damage to Dianthus from ramming U-379

Dianthus spent 1941 escorting trade convoys through coastal waters and the Western Approaches to the United Kingdom until assigned to Mid-Ocean Escort Force (MOEF) group C1. Dianthus rammed and sank U-379 while defending convoy SC 94. During this attack, due to its duration and distance from land, Dianthus ran out of conventional fuel, and had to improvise: amalgamating cooking oil, medical oils etc to make up the shortfall to return to port.

Dianthus was assigned to MOEF group A3 after yard overhaul to repair damage from the ramming. With group A3, she participated in the battles of convoys ON 145, ON 166, SC 121 and HX 233. When group A3 disbanded, Dianthus was assigned to MOEF group C5 until another yard overhaul in August 1943. Dianthus completed refit in November and escorted four more trans-Atlantic convoys in two round trips before being returned to European coastal escort work for the remainder of the war. The ship was decommissioned and sold for civilian use following the end of hostilities, becoming the Norwegian buoy tender Thorslep, and was later used for whaling before being scrapped in 1969.

=== Trans-Atlantic convoys escorted ===
| Convoy | Escort Group | Dates | Notes |
|---|---|---|---|
| SC 77 | | 3–12 April 1942 | 51 ships escorted without loss from Newfoundland to Northern Ireland |
| ON 88 | | 22 April-3 May 1942 | 46 ships escorted without loss from Northern Ireland to Newfoundland |
| HX 189 | MOEF group C1 | 13–20 May 1942 | 20 ships escorted without loss from Newfoundland to Northern Ireland |
| ON 100 | MOEF group C1 | 3–14 June 1942 | Northern Ireland to Newfoundland; 3 ships torpedoed & sunk |
| HX 195 | MOEF group C1 | 24 June-2 July 1942 | 30 ships escorted without loss from Newfoundland to Northern Ireland |
| ON 112 | MOEF group C1 | 14–25 July 1942 | 36 ships escorted without loss from Northern Ireland to Newfoundland |
| SC 94 | MOEF group C1 | 2–8 Aug 1942 | Newfoundland to Northern Ireland; 10 ships torpedoed & sunk |
| ON 145 | MOEF group A3 | 10–20 Nov 1942 | Northern Ireland to Newfoundland; 3 ships torpedoed (1 sank) |
| SC 111 | MOEF group A3 | 1–14 Dec 1942 | 20 ships escorted without loss from Newfoundland to Northern Ireland |
| ON 156 | MOEF group A3 | 24 Dec 1942-8 Jan 1943 | 19 ships escorted without loss from Northern Ireland to Newfoundland |
| HX 223 | MOEF group A3 | 19–28 Jan 1943 | 48 ships escorted without loss from Newfoundland to Northern Ireland |
| SC 117 | temporary reinforcement | 31 Jan-1 Feb 1943 | no ships lost |
| ON 166 | MOEF group A3 | 12–25 Feb 1943 | Northern Ireland to Newfoundland; 12 ships torpedoed (11 sank) |
| SC 121 | MOEF group A3 | 3–12 March 1943 | Newfoundland to Northern Ireland; 7 ships torpedoed & sunk |
| ON 175 | MOEF group A3 | 25 March-8 April 1943 | 36 ships escorted without loss from Northern Ireland to Newfoundland |
| HX 233 | MOEF group A3 | 12–20 April 1943 | Newfoundland to Northern Ireland; 1 ship torpedoed & sunk |
| ON 182 | MOEF group C5 | 7–16 May 1943 | 56 ships escorted without loss from Northern Ireland to Newfoundland |
| HX 240 | MOEF group C5 | 25 May-3 June 1943 | 56 ships escorted without loss from Newfoundland to Northern Ireland |
| ON 188 | | 11–20 June 1943 | 56 ships escorted without loss from Northern Ireland to Newfoundland |
| HX 245 | | 29 June-5 July 1943 | 84 ships escorted without loss from Newfoundland to Northern Ireland |
| ON 193 | | 17–25 July 1943 | 80 ships escorted without loss from Northern Ireland to Newfoundland |
| HX 250 | | 5–11 Aug 1943 | 75 ships escorted without loss from Newfoundland to Northern Ireland |

== See also ==
- Wolf pack

== Notes and references ==
Notes

Bibliography
