= SS Ravelston =

History
- Name: Ravelston (1906-41); Empire Bond (1941-46); Prenton (1946-50); Agios Dionysissios (1950-51); Sandenis (1951); San Denis (1951-59)
- Owner: Prenton Steamship Co Ltd (1906-41); Ministry of War Transport (1941-46); Rethymnis & Kulukundis (1946); Vellisarios Kattoula (1946-50); Argo Maritime Transport Co (1950-51); D G Coucoumbani (1951); G Frangistis(1951-59)
- Operator: Prenton Steamship Co Ltd (1906-41); Gillespie & Nichol (1941-46); Rethymnis & Kulukundis (1946); Vellisarios Kattoula (1946-50); Argo Maritime Transport Co (1950-51); D G Coucoumbani (1951); G Frangistis(1951-59)
- Port of registry: (United Kingdom of Great Britain and Ireland) Grangemouth (1906-22); (United Kingdom) Grangemouth (1922-50); Greece (1950-59)
- Builder: William Gray & Co. Ltd., West Hartlepool
- Yard number: 738
- Launched: 23 June 1906
- Completed: August 1906
- Out of service: 11 May 1959
- Identification: UK Official Number 90525 (1906-50); Greek Official Number 1126 (1950-59); Code Letters HGVJ (1930-33); Code Letter GQTP (1933-46)
- Fate: Scrapped 1959

General characteristics
- Tonnage: 2,088 GRT; DWT 1,293
- Length: 288 ft (87.78 m)
- Beam: 43 ft 1 in (13.13 m)
- Depth: 18 ft 8 in (5.69 m)
- Propulsion: 1 x triple expansion steam engine
- Speed: 9 knots (17 km/h)

Ravelston was an 2,808 GRT cargo ship which was built in 1906 for the Ravelston Steamship Co Ltd. She was requisitioned by the Ministry of War Transport (MoWT) in 1941 and renamed Empire Bond. In 1946 she was sold and renamed Prenton. Following a grounding in 1949, she was declared a constructive total loss, but was sold and repaired, returning to service as Agios Dionysissios. In 1951 she was renamed Sandenis and then San Denis, serving until she was scrapped in 1959.

== Description ==
The ship was built by William Gray & Co. Ltd., West Hartlepool. She was yard number 738. Launched as Ravelston on 23 June 1906, she was completed in August 1906.

The ship was 288 feet (87.78 m) long, with a beam of 43 feet 1 inch (13.13 m) and a depth of 18 feet 8 inches (5.69 m). She was propelled by a triple expansion steam engine which had cylinders of 21 1/2 inches (55 cm), 34 inches (86 cm) and 57 inches (140 cm) bore by 39 inches (99 cm) stroke. The engine was built by the Central Marine Engine Works, West Hartlepool.

== Career ==
Ravelston was built for the Ravelston Steamship Co Ltd. Her port of registry was Grangemouth. On 28 January 1929, Ravelston was in collision with Neion in thick fog off Dungeness, Kent. Both ships were severely damaged at the bow, with their forepeaks flooded. Ravelston was requisitioned in 1941 by the MoWT. She was renamed Empire Bond and was operated under the management of Gillespie and Nichol. Empire Bond was a member of a number of convoys during the Second World War.

ON 14

Convoy ON 14 departed Loch Ewe on 10 September 1941.

SC 46

Convoy SC 46 departed Sydney, Cape Breton on 24 September 1941. The convoy arrived in Liverpool on 10 October. Empire Bond may have been in this convoy.

On 14 March 1945, Empire Bond was in collision with HMCS Assiniboine in the English Channel. In 1946, Empire Bond was sold to Rethymnis & Kulukundis, London and renamed Prenton. Later that year she was sold to J Kattoula, Liverpool. On 9 February 1949, Prenton ran aground off Mytiki, Greece. She was refloated and towed to Preveza, arriving on 13 February. Although Prenton was declared a constructive total loss, she was sold to Argo Maritime Transport Co, Greece, who had her repaired and returned her to service as Agios Dionysissios. In 1951, she was sold to D G Coucoumbanis, Greece and renamed Sandenis. Later that year she was sold to G Frangistis, Greece and renamed San Denis. She arrived for scrapping at Savona, Italy on 11 May 1959.

== Official Numbers and Code Letters ==
Official Numbers were a forerunner to IMO Numbers. Under the UK Flag, she had the UK Official Number 90525. Under the Greek Flag, she had the Greek Official Number 1126. Ravelston used the Code Letters HGVJ from 1930, and GQTP from 1934. Empire Bond also used the Code Letters GQTP.
