= German submarine U-176 =

German World War II submarine

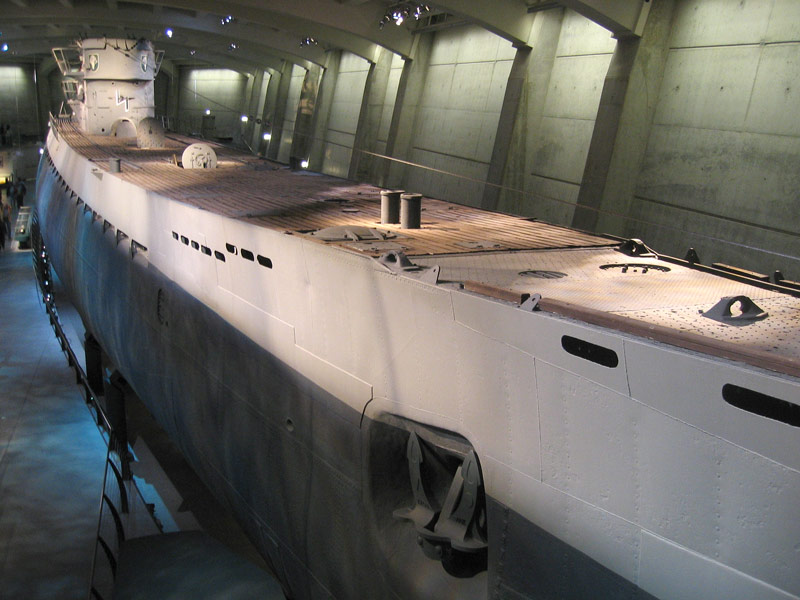
- U-505, a typical Type IXC boat

History

Nazi Germany
- Name: U-176
- Ordered: 23 December 1939
- Builder: DeSchiMAG AG Weser, Bremen
- Yard number: 1016
- Laid down: 6 February 1941
- Launched: 12 September 1941
- Commissioned: 15 December 1941
- Home port: Lorient, France
- Fate: Sunk, 15 May 1943

General characteristics
- Class & type: Type IXC submarine
- Displacement: 1,120 t (1,100 long tons) surfaced; 1,232 t (1,213 long tons) submerged
- Length: 76.76 m (251 ft 10 in) o/a; 58.75 m (192 ft 9 in) pressure hull
- Beam: 6.76 m (22 ft 2 in) o/a; 4.40 m (14 ft 5 in) pressure hull
- Height: 9.60 m (31 ft 6 in)
- Draught: 4.70 m (15 ft 5 in)
- Installed power: 4,400 PS (3,200 kW; 4,300 bhp) (diesels); 1,000 PS (740 kW; 990 shp) (electric)
- Propulsion: 2 shafts; 2 × diesel engines; 2 × electric motors
- Speed: 18.3 knots (33.9 km/h; 21.1 mph) surfaced; 7.3 knots (13.5 km/h; 8.4 mph) submerged
- Range: 13,450 nmi (24,910 km; 15,480 mi) at 10 knots (19 km/h; 12 mph) surfaced; 64 nmi (119 km; 74 mi) at 4 knots (7.4 km/h; 4.6 mph) submerged
- Test depth: 230 m (750 ft)
- Complement: 4 officers, 44 enlisted
- Armament: 6 × torpedo tubes (4 bow, 2 stern); 22 × 53.3 cm (21 in) torpedoes; 1 × 10.5 cm (4.1 in) SK C/32 deck gun (180 rounds); 1 × 3.7 cm (1.5 in) SK C/30 AA gun; 1 × twin 2 cm FlaK 30 AA guns

Service record
- Part of: 4th U-boat Flotilla; 15 December 1941 – 31 July 1942; 10th U-boat Flotilla; 1 August 1942 – 15 May 1943
- Identification codes: M 47 665
- Commanders: K.Kapt. Reiner Dierksen; 15 December 1941 – 15 May 1943
- Operations: 3 patrols: 1st patrol: 21 July – 2 October 1942; 2nd patrol: 9 November 1942 – 18 February 1943; 3rd patrol: 6 April – 15 May 1943
- Victories: 11 merchant ships sunk (53,307 GRT)

German submarine U-176 was a Type IXC U-boat in Nazi Germany's Kriegsmarine during World War II.

Built at the DeSchiMAG AG Weser shipyard in Bremen, she was laid down on 6 February 1941, launched on 12 September and commissioned on 15 December, under the command of Kapitänleutnant Reiner Dierksen.

U-176 served with the 4. Unterseebootsflotille (U-boat flotilla) while training, and from 1 August 1942 with the 10th U-boat Flotilla, a long-range operations unit. U-176 completed three patrols, sinking 11 ships totalling 53,307 gross register tons (GRT) before she was sunk off Cayo Blanquizal by the Cuban Navy on 15 May 1943.

== Design ==
German Type IXC submarines were slightly larger than the original Type IXBs. U-176 had a displacement of 1,120 tonnes (1,100 long tons) when at the surface and 1,232 tonnes (1,213 long tons) while submerged. The U-boat had a total length of 76.76 m (251 ft 10 in), a pressure hull length of 58.75 m (192 ft 9 in), a beam of 6.76 m (22 ft 2 in), a height of 9.60 m (31 ft 6 in), and a draught of 4.70 m (15 ft 5 in). The submarine was powered by two MAN M 9 V 40/46 supercharged four-stroke, nine-cylinder diesel engines producing a total of 4,400 metric horsepower (3,240 kW; 4,340 shp) for use while surfaced, two Siemens-Schuckert 2 GU 345/34 double-acting electric motors producing a total of 1,000 shaft horsepower (1,010 PS; 750 kW) for use while submerged. She had two shafts and two 1.92 m (6 ft) propellers. The boat was capable of operating at depths of up to 230 metres (750 ft).

The submarine had a maximum surface speed of 18.3 knots (33.9 km/h; 21.1 mph) and a maximum submerged speed of 7.3 knots (13.5 km/h; 8.4 mph). When submerged, the boat could operate for 63 nautical miles (117 km; 72 mi) at 4 knots (7.4 km/h; 4.6 mph); when surfaced, she could travel 13,450 nautical miles (24,910 km; 15,480 mi) at 10 knots (19 km/h; 12 mph). U-176 was fitted with six 53.3 cm (21 in) torpedo tubes (four fitted at the bow and two at the stern), 22 torpedoes, one 10.5 cm (4.13 in) SK C/32 naval gun, 180 rounds, and a 3.7 cm (1.5 in) SK C/30 as well as a 2 cm (0.79 in) C/30 anti-aircraft gun. The boat had a complement of forty-eight.

== Service history ==
=== First patrol ===
On 21 July 1942 U-176 sailed from Kiel, around the British Isles, and into the north Atlantic Ocean. She made her first kill on 4 August, sinking the unescorted 7,798 GRT British merchantman Richmond Castle with two torpedoes.

On 7 August she joined five other U-boats in reinforcing the eight boats of wolfpack Steinbrinck in a series of attacks on Convoy SC 94. On 8 August U-176 fired two salvoes of two torpedoes each at the convoy, sinking two British cargo ships, the 4,817 GRT Trehata and the 3,956 GRT Kelso, and the 7,914 GRT Greek cargo ship Mount Kassion. The next day she also sank another British ship, the 3,701 GRT Radchurch, which had been abandoned. The convoy escort was then reinforced by the Polish destroyer Błyskawica and the British destroyer leader Broke. Both ships were equipped with HF/DF (radio direction-finding equipment), which helped to keep the U-boats at bay until morning.

U-176 sank the 7,457 GRT British cargo ship Empire Breeze with two torpedoes on 25 August. The ship had been part of convoy ON 122; the U-boat ended the patrol after 74 days at sea at Lorient in France on 2 October 1942. The day after her return her captain was awarded the Iron Cross 1st Class.

=== Second patrol ===
U-176 departed Lorient on 9 November 1942 and headed into the south Atlantic. On 27 November she sank the 5,922 GRT Dutch merchant ship Polydorus after a 50-hour pursuit, the longest recorded by any U-boat in the Second World War.

Off Cape São Roque, Brazil, on 13 December 1942 the crew of U-176 boarded the 1,629 GRT Swedish cargo ship Scania, and sank her with scuttling charges after the crew had abandoned ship. On 16 December she sank the unescorted 5,881 GRT British cargo ship Observer with two torpedoes.

Prior to the sinking of Scania, a young seaman, Gottfrid Sundberg, surreptitiously photographed U-176 from Scania.

U-176 arrived back at Lorient on 18 February 1943 after a patrol lasting 102 days.

=== Third patrol ===
U-176 sailed for her third and final patrol on 6 April 1943 from Lorient, sailing across the Atlantic and into the Caribbean Sea. On 1 May, her commander was notified of his promotion to Korvettenkapitän.

On 13 May 1943, U-176 attacked Convoy NC 18 only five miles off the northern coast of Cuba, sinking the 2,249 GRT American tanker Nickeliner, which was loaded with 3,400 tons of ammonia water, and the 1,983 GRT Cuban molasses tanker Mambí.

==== Sinking ====
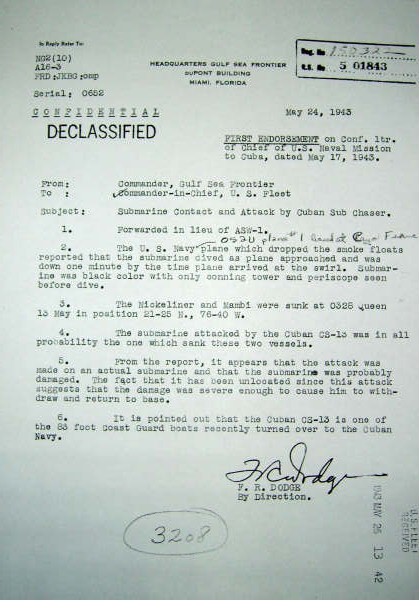
US Navy report of the attack on U-176

On 15 May, the Cuban merchant ship Camagüey, and the Honduran Hanks, both loaded with sugar, sailed from Sagua La Grande, bound for Havana, escorted by the Cuban submarine chasers CS-11, CS-12, and CS-13. At 17:15 hours, a U.S. Navy Kingfisher aircraft from squadron VS-62 operating from Cuba spotted U-176 at 23°21′N 80°18′W and dropped a smoke float to mark her position about one and a half miles astern of the convoy. CS-13 located the U-boat with her sonar, attacked with depth charges and sank U-176.

On 7 January 1944 K.Kapt.. Reiner Dierksen was posthumously awarded the Deutsches Kreuz in Gold.

CS-13 was commanded by the Cuban Navy's Alférez de Fragata, Mario Ramirez Delgado commanding, the only Cuban national to sink a U-boat during World War II. In 1946, Delgado, promoted to Lieutenant, was awarded the Orden del Mérito Naval con Distantivo Rojo (Meritorious Naval Service Order with Red Badge). Rear Admiral Samuel E. Morison, official historian of the US Navy, recognized his success in his work History of United States Naval Operations in World War II, where he also praised the ability and efficiency of the Cuban seamen.

The CS-13 patrol boat, commanded by Second Lieutenant Mario Ramirez Delgado, turned toward the gas, made good contact through the sonar and launched two perfect attacks with deep charges which annihilated the U-176. This was the only successful attack against a submarine carried out by a surface unit smaller than a PCE [Patrol Craft Escort] of 180 feet. Thus, the sinking is properly considered with great pride by the small but efficient Cuban Navy.

Also present was Norberto Collado Abreu, who later found fame as the pilot of Granma, the yacht which brought Fidel Castro back to Cuba to restart the Cuban Revolution.

=== Wolfpacks ===
U-176 took part in two wolfpacks, namely:

- Steinbrinck (5 – 11 August 1942)
- Lohs (11 August – 1 September 1942)

== Summary of raiding history ==
| Date | Ship | Nationality | Tonnage (GRT) | Fate |
|---|---|---|---|---|
| 4 August 1942 | Richmond Castle | United Kingdom | 7,798 | Sunk |
| 8 August 1942 | Kelso | United Kingdom | 3,956 | Sunk |
| 8 August 1942 | Mount Kassion | Greece | 7,914 | Sunk |
| 8 August 1942 | Trehata | United Kingdom | 4,817 | Sunk |
| 9 August 1942 | Radchurch | United Kingdom | 3,701 | Sunk |
| 25 August 1942 | Empire Breeze | United Kingdom | 7,457 | Sunk |
| 27 November 1942 | Polydorus | Netherlands | 5,922 | Sunk |
| 13 December 1942 | Scania | Sweden | 1,629 | Sunk |
| 16 December 1942 | Observer | United Kingdom | 5,881 | Sunk |
| 13 May 1943 | Mambí | Cuba | 1,983 | Sunk |
| 13 May 1943 | Nickeliner | United States | 2,249 | Sunk |

== Bibliography ==
- Bishop, Chris (2006). Kriegsmarine U-Boats, 1939–45. Amber Books. ISBN 1-86227-352-9.
- Busch, Rainer; Röll, Hans-Joachim (1999). German U-boat commanders of World War II : a biographical dictionary. Translated by Brooks, Geoffrey. London, Annapolis, Md: Greenhill Books, Naval Institute Press. ISBN 1-55750-186-6.
- Busch, Rainer; Röll, Hans-Joachim (1999). Deutsche U-Boot-Verluste von September 1939 bis Mai 1945 [German U-boat losses from September 1939 to May 1945]. Der U-Boot-Krieg (in German). Vol. IV. Hamburg, Berlin, Bonn: Mittler. ISBN 3-8132-0514-2.
- Gröner, Erich; Jung, Dieter; Maass, Martin (1991). U-boats and Mine Warfare Vessels. German Warships 1815–1945. Vol. 2. Translated by Thomas, Keith; Magowan, Rachel. London: Conway Maritime Press. ISBN 0-85177-593-4.
