= Convoy SC 94 =

Convoy during naval battles of the Second World War

- Part of Battle of the Atlantic
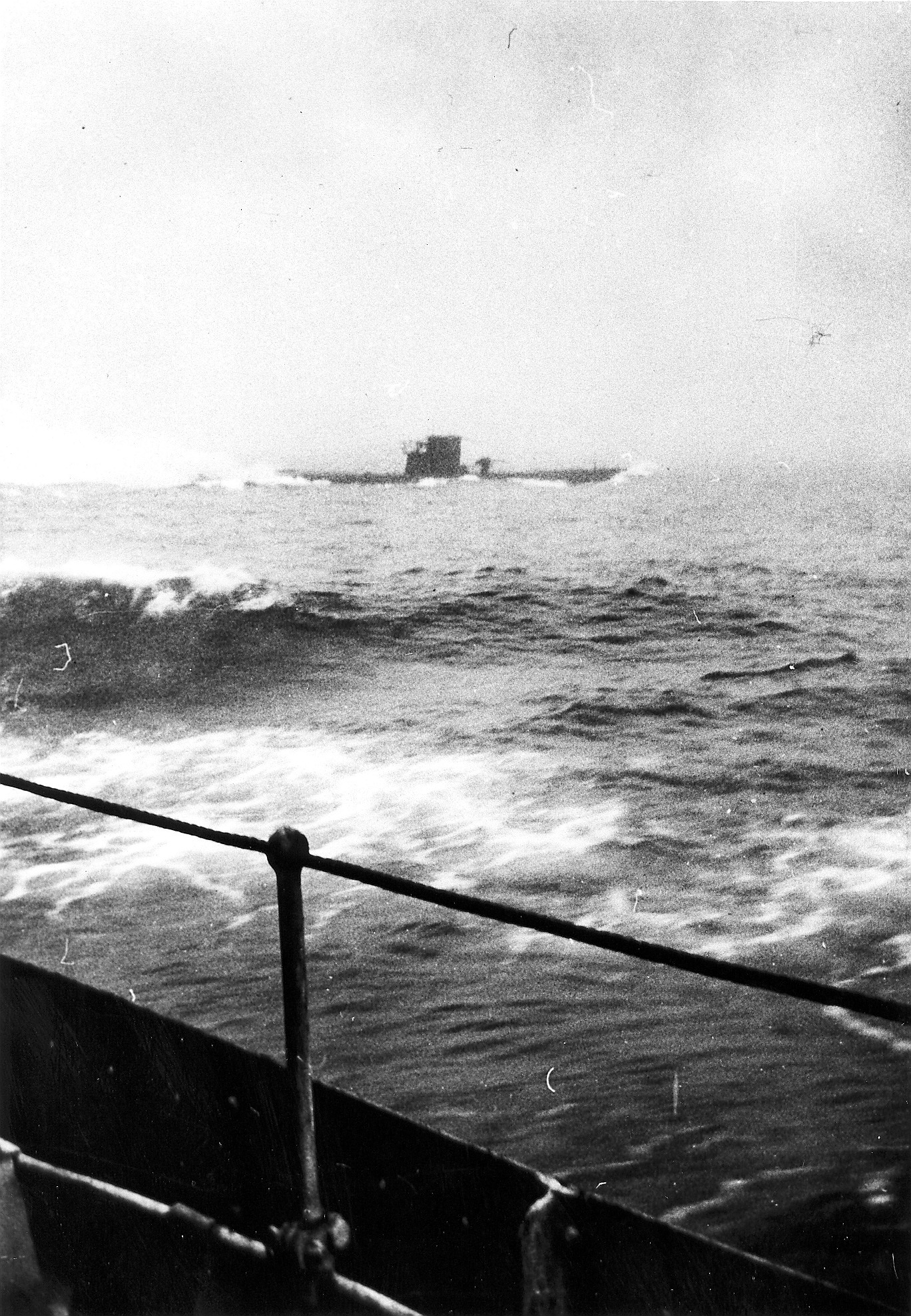
- U-210 photographed from Assiniboine's deck, 6 August 1942
Date	5–10 August 1942
Location	North Atlantic
Result	German victory

Belligerents
United Kingdom; Canada; Poland	(Nazi Germany) Germany

Commanders and leaders
VADM D F Moir; LCDR A. Ayer RNR	BdU:Karl Dönitz

Strength
35 freighters 3 destroyers 6 corvettes	19 submarines

Casualties and losses
11 freighters sunk (50,780GRT); 1 destroyer damaged 1 corvette damaged 61 killed/drowned	2 submarines sunk 46 killed/drowned 42 captured

Convoy SC 94 was the 94th of the numbered series of World War II slow convoys of merchant ships from Sydney, Cape Breton Island, Nova Scotia, to Liverpool. The ships departed Sydney on 31 July 1942 and were met by Mid-Ocean Escort Force Group C-1.

== Background ==
As western Atlantic coastal convoys brought an end to the Second Happy Time, Admiral Karl Dönitz, the Befehlshaber der U-Boote (commander in chief of U-boats), shifted focus to the mid-Atlantic to avoid aircraft patrols. Although convoy routing was less predictable in the mid-ocean, Dönitz anticipated that the increased numbers of U-boats being produced would be able to effectively search the area with the advantage of intelligence gained through B-Dienst decryption of British Naval Cypher Number 3. However, only 20 percent of the 180 trans-Atlantic convoys sailing from the end of July 1942 until the end of April 1943 lost ships to U-boat attack.

== Battle ==
=== Discovery on 5 August ===
U-593 reported the convoy on 5 August and torpedoed the Dutch freighter Spar.

=== Attack of 6 August ===
Assiniboine's Type 286 radar spotted U-210 in a heavy fog on 6 August. The destroyer closed on the contact and briefly spotted the submarine twice before losing her in the fog. The submarine reappeared crossing the destroyer's bow at a range of 50 yards (46 m), and both ships opened fire. The range was too close for Assiniboine's 4.7 in (119 mm) guns to engage, but her .50-calibre machine guns shot up the submarine's deck and conning tower. This kept the Germans from manning their 88 mm (3 in) deck gun, but the 20 mm (0.79 in) flak gun was already manned and firing. It punched holes through the destroyer's plating that set some petrol tanks on the deck afire and disabled 'A' gun. The destroyer was unable to ram U-210 until the rear 4.7-inch gun hit the conning tower, killing the entire bridge crew and the .50-caliber machine guns were able to silence the flak gun. This caused Lieutenant Sorber, the senior surviving officer, to order the submarine to dive, but this meant that she had to hold a straight course while doing so. Assiniboine was able to take advantage of this and rammed U-210 abaft the conning tower whilst she was diving. This caused the electric motors to fail, damaged her propellers and led to water entering the submarine, as a result of which Sorber ordered the ballast tanks to be blown and the submarine to be abandoned. The destroyer rammed her again when U-210 resurfaced, dropped a pattern of depth charges set to detonate at shallow depth and hit her one more time with a 4.7-inch shell before the submarine finally sank.

=== Attack of 8 August ===
U-379 torpedoed the British freighter Anneberg and American freighter Kaimoku on the afternoon of 8 August while U-176 torpedoed the British freighters Kelso and Trehata and Greek freighter Mount Kassion. Three undamaged ships were abandoned in the resulting panic. One of them, the British freighter Radchurch, was later torpedoed by U-176. The Shakespeare-class destroyer leader Broke and the Polish destroyer Błyskawica arrived to reinforce the escort, while Dianthus left the convoy to repair damage incurred while ramming and sinking U-379.

=== Attack of 10 August ===
U-438 torpedoed the Greek freighter Condylis in daylight on 10 August while U-660 torpedoed the British freighters Cape Race, Empire Reindeer and Oregon. The remainder of the convoy reached Liverpool on 13 August.

== Ships in the convoy ==
=== Allied merchant ships ===
A total of 35 merchant vessels joined the convoy, either in Sydney or later in the voyage.

Name	Flag	Dead	Tonnage (GRT)	Cargo	Notes
Aghios Spyridon (1905)	Greece		3,338	Grain	Survived this convoy and convoy SC 104
Anneberg (1902)	United Kingdom	0	2,537	3,200 tons woodpulp	Sunk by U-379 8 Aug
Bifrost (1923)	Sweden		4,949	Flour	
Boston City (1920)	United Kingdom		2,870	General cargo	Survived this convoy, convoy ON 127, convoy SC 104 & convoy SC 122
Brisk (1923)	Norway		1,594	Flour & general cargo	
Cape Race (1930)	United Kingdom	0	3,807	13 passengers, 3,979 tons lumber & 1,040 tons steel	Sunk by U-660 10 Aug
Castilian (1919)	United Kingdom		3,067	General cargo	Veteran of convoy HX 84
Condylis (1914)	Greece	9	4,439	6,924 tons grain & trucks	Sunk by U-660 & U-438 10 Aug
Daleby (1929)	United Kingdom		4,640	General cargo	
Drakepool (1924)	United Kingdom		4,838	(in ballast)	Survived this convoy and convoy SC 122
Empire Antelope (1919)	United Kingdom		4,945	General cargo	Survived to be sunk 2 months later in convoy SC 107
Empire Moonbeam (1941)	United Kingdom		6,849	Phosphates	Survived to be sunk the following month in convoy ON 127
Empire Reindeer (1919)	United Kingdom	0	6,259	5,950 tons woodpulp & general cargo	Sunk by U-660 10 Aug
Empire Scout (1936)	United Kingdom		2,229	Grain	Ship's master was convoy vice-commodore
Hagood (1919)	United States		6,866	Diesel	
Illinoian (1918)	United States		6,473	Mail & general cargo	
Inger Lise (1939)	Norway		1,582	Lumber	Survived this convoy and convoy SC 104
Ingerfem (1912)	Norway		3,987	Iron ore	Survived this convoy and convoy SC 104
Kaimoku (1919)	United States	4	6,367	US Army stores	Sunk by U-379 8 Aug
Kelso (1924)	United Kingdom	3	3,956	2,000 tons ammunition & 2,618 tons general cargo	Sunk by U-176 8 Aug
Mars (1925)	Netherlands		1,582	Flour	Survived this convoy and convoy SC 104
Melmore Head (1918)	United Kingdom		5,273	General cargo	Veteran of convoy SC 7; survived to be sunk 4 months later in convoy ON 154
Mount Kassion (1918)	Greece	0	5,273	9,700 tons general cargo	Sunk by U-176 8 Aug
Mount Pelion (1917)	Greece		5,655	General cargo	Survived to be sunk 2 months later in convoy SC 107
Norelg (1920)	Norway		6,103	General cargo	
Oregon (1920)	United Kingdom	11	6,008	1 passenger & 8,107 tons general cargo	Sunk by U-660 & U-438 10 Aug
Osric (1919)	Sweden		1,418	Timber	
Panos (1920)	United Kingdom		4,914	Coal	
Penolver (1912)	United Kingdom		3,721	Grain & general cargo	
Radchurch (1910)	United Kingdom	0	3,701	Iron ore	Abandoned undamaged & sunk by U-176 9 Aug
Spar (1924)	Netherlands	3	3,616	Mail & 4,900 tons general cargo	Sunk by U-593 5 Aug
Trehata (1928)	United Kingdom	31	4,817	3,000 tons steel & 3,000 tons food	Carried convoy commodore VADM Dashwood Fowler Moir DSO; sunk by U-176 8 Aug
Tynemouth (1940)	United Kingdom		3,168	Lumber & steel	Survived this convoy, convoy SL 125 & convoy ON 154
Veni (1901)	Norway		2,982	Steel & woodpulp	Survived this convoy & convoy ON 154
Willemsplein (1910)	Netherlands		5,489	Iron ore	Survived this convoy & convoy ON 127

=== Convoy escorts ===
A series of armed military ships escorted the convoy at various times during its journey.

Name	Flag	Type	Joined	Left
HMCS Assiniboine	Royal Canadian Navy	River-class destroyer	31 Jul 1942	13 Aug 1942
HMCS Battleford	Royal Canadian Navy	Flower-class corvette	31 Jul 1942	13 Aug 1942
ORP Błyskawica	Polish Navy	Grom-class destroyer	8 Aug 1942	13 Aug 1942
HMS Broke	Royal Navy	Shakespeare-class destroyer leader	8 Aug 1942	13 Aug 1942
HMCS Chilliwack	Royal Canadian Navy	Flower-class corvette	31 Jul 1942	13 Aug 1942
HMS Dianthus	Royal Navy	Flower-class corvette	31 Jul 1942	8 Aug 1942, due to damage from sinking U-379
HMS Nasturtium	Royal Navy	Flower-class corvette	31 Jul 1942	13 Aug 1942
HMCS Orillia	Royal Canadian Navy	Flower-class corvette	31 Jul 1942	13 Aug 1942
HMS Primrose	Royal Navy	Flower-class corvette	31 Jul 1942	13 Aug 1942

== See also ==
- Convoy Battles of World War II
