= French submarine Henri Poincaré =

Submarine

Henri Poincaré
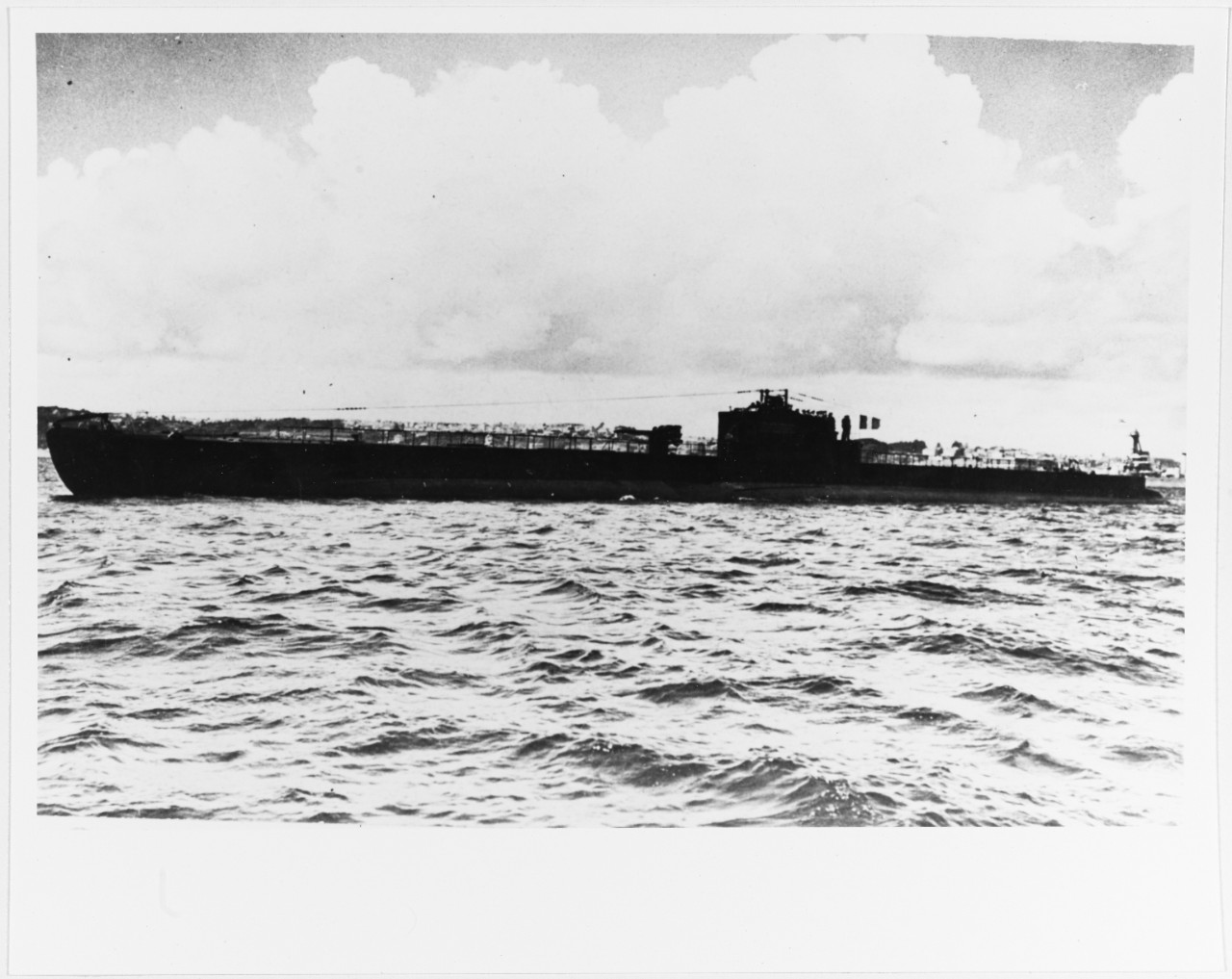
- Henri Poincaré in port in France during the 1930s

History

France
- Name: Henri Poincaré
- Namesake: Henri Poincaré (1854–1912), French mathematician, theoretical physicist, engineer, and philosopher of science
- Operator: French Navy
- Builder: Arsenal de Lorient, Lorient, France
- Laid down: 1 March 1927
- Launched: 10 April 1929
- Commissioned: 23 December 1931
- Home port: Brest, France
- Fate: Scuttled 27 November 1942; Seized by Italy

Italy
- Name: FR 118
- Acquired: On or after 27 November 1942
- Fate: Refloated June 1943; Scuttled 9 September 1943; Seized by Germany 9 September 1943

Nazi Germany
- Acquired: 9 September 1943
- Fate: Scrapped

General characteristics
- Class & type: Redoutable-class submarine
- Displacement: 1,572 tonnes (1,547 long tons) (surfaced); 2,092 tonnes (2,059 long tons) (submerged)
- Length: 92.3 m (302 ft 10 in)
- Beam: 8.1 m (26 ft 7 in)
- Draft: 4.4 m (14 ft 5 in) (surfaced)
- Propulsion: 2 × diesel engines, 6,000 hp (4,474 kW); 2 × electric motors, 2,250 hp (1,678 kW)
- Speed: 17.5 kn (32.4 km/h; 20.1 mph) (surfaced); 10 kn (19 km/h; 12 mph) (submerged)
- Range: 14,000 nmi (26,000 km; 16,000 mi) at 7 kn (13 km/h; 8.1 mph) (surfaced); 10,000 nmi (19,000 km; 12,000 mi) at 10 kn (19 km/h; 12 mph) (surfaced); 4,000 nmi (7,400 km; 4,600 mi) at 17 kn (31 km/h; 20 mph) (surfaced); 90 nmi (170 km; 100 mi) at 7 kn (13 km/h; 8.1 mph) (submerged)
- Test depth: 80 m (262 ft)
- Complement: 5 officers (6 in operations); 66 men
- Armament: 11 torpedo tubes; 1 × 100 mm (3.9 in) gun; 1 × 13.2 mm (0.5 in) machine gun

Henri Poincaré was a French Navy Redoutable-class submarine of the M6 series commissioned in 1931. She participated in World War II, first on the side of the Allies from 1939 to June 1940, then in the navy of Vichy France until she was scuttled at Toulon in November 1942. The Italians refloated Henri Poincaré in June 1943 and renamed her FR 118, then scuttled her in September 1943. The Germans later scrapped her wreck.

== Characteristics ==
Profile of Casabianca, sister ship of Henri Poincaré

Henri Poincaré was part of a fairly homogeneous series of 31 deep-sea patrol submarines also called "1,500-tonners" because of their displacement. All entered service between 1931 and 1939.

The Redoutable-class submarines were 92.3 metres (302 ft 10 in) long and 8.1 metres (26 ft 7 in) in beam and had a draft of 4.4 metres (14 ft 5 in). They could dive to a depth of 80 metres (262 ft). They displaced 1,572 tonnes (1,547 long tons) on the surface and 2,082 tonnes (2,049 long tons) underwater. Propelled on the surface by two diesel engines producing a combined 6,000 horsepower (4,474 kW), they had a maximum speed of 18.6 knots (34.4 km/h; 21.4 mph). When submerged, their two electric motors produced a combined 2,250 horsepower (1,678 kW) and allowed them to reach 10 knots (19 km/h; 12 mph). Also called “deep-cruising submarines”, their range on the surface was 10,000 nautical miles (19,000 km; 12,000 mi) at 10 knots (19 km/h; 12 mph). Underwater, they could travel 100 nautical miles (190 km; 120 mi) at 5 knots (9.3 km/h; 5.8 mph).

== Construction and commissioning ==
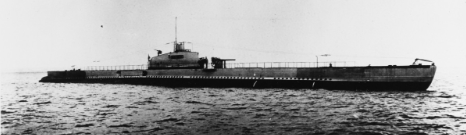
Henri Poincaré, probably soon after her completion in 1931

Authorized in the 1925 naval program, Henri Poincaré was laid down at Arsenal de Lorient in Lorient, France, on 1 March 1927 with the hull number Q140. She was launched on 10 April 1929 at the same time as her sister ship Poncelet. Henri Poincaré was commissioned on 23 December 1931.

== Service history ==
=== World War II ===
==== French Navy ====
At the start of World War II in September 1939, Henri Poincaré was assigned to the 4th Submarine Division in the 1st Squadron, home-ported at Brest, France. Her sister ships Argo, Le Centaure, and Pascal made up the rest of the division.

The French assigned the responsibility for the defense of the coast of French Morocco to the 4th Submarine Division, and Henri Poincaré and the division's other submarines began patrols 60 to 70 nautical miles (110 to 130 km; 69 to 81 mi) off French Morocco on 3 September 1939, the day France entered World War II on the side of the Allies. The patrols were cancelled on 5 September, when German forces were reported back in their bases.

In November and December 1939, Henri Poincaré and Pascal patrolled in the Atlantic Ocean south of the Azores in search of German U-boats and their supply ships. From 21 to 25 November 1939, the two submarines searched for the German cargo ship Rekum, based on an erroneous report that she had put to sea from Santa Cruz de Tenerife on Tenerife in the Canary Islands.

In April 1940 the French Navy established the new 4th Flotilla at Bizerte in Tunisia and assigned Henri Poincaré, Argo, Le Centaure, and Pascal to it along with their sister ships Fresnel, Le Conquérant, Le Glorieux, L'Espoir, Le Héros, Le Tonnant, Monge, Pégase, and Vengeur. By May 1940, Henri Poincaré was operating from Bizerte.

German ground forces advanced into France on 10 May 1940, beginning the Battle of France, and Italy declared war on France on 10 June 1940 and joined the invasion. On 16 June 1940, Henri Poincaré and Le Centaure began a patrol southeast of the Strait of Messina, and at dawn on 22 June 1940 Henri Poincaré tried unsuccessfully to approach three Italian cruisers entering the naval base at Augusta, Sicily. The Battle of France ended in France's defeat and armistices with Germany on 22 June 1940 and with Italy on 24 June, both of which went into effect on 25 June 1940. Henri Poincaré returned to Bizerte at 06:40 on 25 June, having had no success during her patrol.

==== Vichy France ====
Henri Poincaré subsequently served in the naval forces of Vichy France. After France's capitulation, she initially remained assigned to the 4th Submarine Division at Bizerte. By 1 August 1940, she had been reassigned along with Pascal to the 5th Submarine Division at Bizerte.

As of 1 January 1942, Henri Poincaré was assigned to the 5th Submarine Division at Casablanca in French Morocco along with Fresnel, Pascal, and their sister ship Actéon. In early 1942, she departed French Morocco to undergo a major overhaul at La Ciotat, France. The overhaul took eight months. Upon its completion, she was placed under guard at Toulon, France, in a disarmed and unfueled state in accordance with the terms of the Armistice of 22 June 1940. After Allied forces landed in French North Africa on 8 November 1942 in Operation Torch, she was authorized to rearm for the defense of Toulon against Allied attack.

Moored at Berth 9 at the Darse Nord du Mourillon with her diesel engines disassembled, Henri Poincaré was not yet able get underway when Germany and Italy occupied the Free Zone (French: Zone libre) of Vichy France on 27 November 1942, and she was among the French vessels scuttled at Toulon to prevent their seizure by Germany when German forces entered Toulon that day. Germans already had come aboard Henri Poincaré by the time her crew opened her seacocks to scuttle her, and the French crewmen and Germans jostled one another as the French abandoned ship and the enraged Germans rushed below to try to prevent her from sinking. Unfamiliar with submarines, the Germans were unsuccessful and narrowly avoided drowning as they evacuated the sinking submarine.

==== Italy ====
The Germans seized Henri Poincaré and handed her over to the Italians. They drained her of 200 tonnes (197 long tons; 220 short tons) of water and refloated her in June 1943. Renamed FR 118 in Italian service, she got underway from Toulon under her own power bound for La Spezia, Italy, on 2 September 1943. The Italians scuttled FR 118 at Genoa, Italy, on 9 September 1943 after Italy surrendered to the Allies and switched to the Allied side in accordance with the terms of the Armistice of Cassibile.

==== Germany ====
The Germans seized FR 118's wreck at Genoa on 9 September 1943. They scrapped it at La Spezia. France recovered her diesel engines in 1946.
