= French submarine Pascal =

Warship Battleship

Pascal
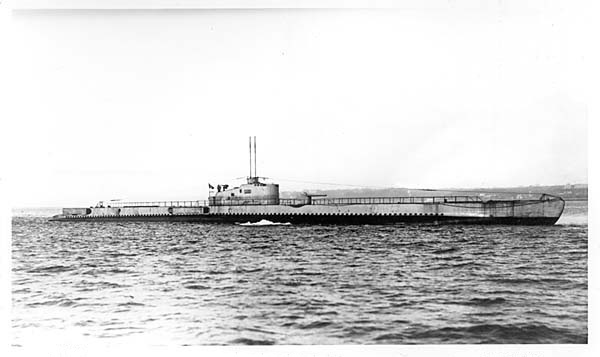
- Pascal's sister ship Ajax in 1930.

History

France
- Name: Pascal
- Namesake: Blaise Pascal (1623–1662), French mathematician, physicist, inventor, philosopher, writer, and theologian
- Operator: French Navy
- Ordered: 1925
- Builder: Arsenal de Brest, Brest, France
- Laid down: 8 June 1926
- Launched: 19 July 1928
- Commissioned: 10 September 1931
- Home port: Brest, France
- Fate: Scuttled 27 November 1942; Seized by Italy

Italy
- Acquired: On or after 27 November 1942
- Fate: Refloated 20 January 1943 or 5 June 1943; Seized by Germany 9 September 1943

Nazi Germany
- Acquired: 9 September 1943
- Fate: Sunk 11 March 1944

General characteristics
- Class & type: Redoutable-class submarine
- Displacement: 1,572 tonnes (1,547 long tons) (surfaced); 2,092 tonnes (2,059 long tons) (submerged)
- Length: 92.3 m (302 ft 10 in)
- Beam: 8.1 m (26 ft 7 in)
- Draft: 4.4 m (14 ft 5 in) (surfaced)
- Propulsion: 2 × diesel engines, 6,000 hp (4,474 kW); 2 × electric motors, 2,250 hp (1,678 kW)
- Speed: 17.5 kn (32.4 km/h; 20.1 mph) (surfaced); 10 kn (19 km/h; 12 mph) (submerged)
- Range: 14,000 nmi (26,000 km; 16,000 mi) at 7 kn (13 km/h; 8.1 mph) (surfaced); 10,000 nmi (19,000 km; 12,000 mi) at 10 kn (19 km/h; 12 mph) (surfaced); 4,000 nmi (7,400 km; 4,600 mi) at 17 kn (31 km/h; 20 mph) (surfaced); 90 nmi (170 km; 100 mi) at 7 kn (13 km/h; 8.1 mph) (submerged)
- Test depth: 80 m (262 ft)
- Complement: 5 officers (6 in operations); 66 men
- Armament: 11 torpedo tubes; 1 × 100 mm (3.9 in) gun; 1 × 13.2 mm (0.5 in) machine gun

Pascal was a French Navy Redoutable-class submarine of the M6 series commissioned in 1931. She participated in World War II, first on the side of the Allies from 1939 to June 1940, then in the navy of Vichy France until she was scuttled at Toulon in November 1942. She was never again seaworthy, but the Italians seized her and refloated her, and the Germans later took control of her. She was sunk in March 1944.

== Characteristics ==
Profile of Casabianca, sister ship of Pascal.

Pascal was part of a fairly homogeneous series of 31 deep-sea patrol submarines also called "1,500-tonners" because of their displacement. All entered service between 1931 and 1939.

The Redoutable-class submarines were 92.3 metres (302 ft 10 in) long and 8.1 metres (26 ft 7 in) in beam and had a draft of 4.4 metres (14 ft 5 in). They could dive to a depth of 80 metres (262 ft). They displaced 1,572 tonnes (1,547 long tons) on the surface and 2,082 tonnes (2,049 long tons) underwater. Propelled on the surface by two diesel engines producing a combined 6,000 horsepower (4,474 kW), they had a maximum speed of 18.6 knots (34.4 km/h; 21.4 mph). When submerged, their two electric motors produced a combined 2,250 horsepower (1,678 kW) and allowed them to reach 10 knots (19 km/h; 12 mph). Also called "deep-cruising submarines", their range on the surface was 10,000 nautical miles (19,000 km; 12,000 mi) at 10 knots (19 km/h; 12 mph). Underwater, they could travel 100 nautical miles (190 km; 120 mi) at 5 knots (9.3 km/h; 5.8 mph).

== Construction and commissioning ==
Authorized in the 1925 naval program, Pascal was laid down at Arsenal de Brest in Brest, France, on 8 June 1926 with the hull number Q138. She was launched on 19 July 1928 and commissioned on 10 September 1931.

== Service history ==
=== 1931–1939 ===
From 1930, the French Navy equipped several of its submarines — including Pascal — with hydrophones mounted in front of the forward diving planes and connected to a compensator. This system allowed sound operators aboard the submarines to determine the bearing of underwater sound sources out to ranges of 8,000 metres (8,750 yd) to an accuracy of within 2 degrees.

=== World War II ===
==== French Navy ====
At the start of World War II in September 1939, Pascal was assigned to the 4th Submarine Division in the 1st Squadron, home-ported at Brest. Her sister ships Argo, Henri Poincaré, and Le Centaure made up the rest of the division.

The French assigned the responsibility for the defense of the coast of French Morocco to the 4th Submarine Division, and Pascal and the division's other submarines began patrols 60 to 70 nautical miles (110 to 130 km; 69 to 81 mi) off French Morocco on 3 September 1939, the day France entered World War II on the side of the Allies. The patrols were cancelled on 5 September, when German forces were reported back in their bases.

In November and December 1939, Pascal and Henri Poincaré patrolled in the Atlantic Ocean south of the Azores in search of German U-boats and their supply ships. On either 17 November or 17 December 1939, according to different sources, Pascal's crew boarded the Italian ocean liner Saturnia to check her passengers — among whom were eight Germans, seven of them German Jews — before allowing her to proceed. From 21 to 25 November 1939, the two submarines searched for the German cargo ship Rekum, based on an erroneous report that she had put to sea from Santa Cruz de Tenerife on Tenerife in the Canary Islands.

At 07:00 on 16 January 1940, Pascal fired a warning shot at a merchant ship her crew suspected of being a blockade runner. After the ship stopped, Pascal′s crew determined that she was the British steam cargo ship SS Highland Princess and released her to continue her voyage.

In April 1940 the French Navy established the new 4th Flotilla at Bizerte in Tunisia and assigned Pascal, Argo, Henri Poincaré, and Le Centaure to it along with their sister ships Fresnel, Le Conquérant, Le Glorieux, L'Espoir, Le Héros, Le Tonnant, Monge, Pégase, and Vengeur. Accordingly, Pascal began to operate from Bizerte.

German ground forces advanced into France on 10 May 1940, beginning the Battle of France, and Italy declared war on France on 10 June 1940 and joined the invasion. On 13 June, Pascal and Le Centaure got underway for a patrol south of Sardinia between 38 degrees 10 minutes North and 38 degrees 30 minutes North. That day, Pascal crash-dived and avoided damage when an Italian plane attacked her, dropping three bombs. Pascal and Le Centaure sighted no ships during their patrol. The Battle of France ended in France's defeat and armistices with Germany on 22 June 1940 and with Italy on 24 June, both of which went into effect on 25 June 1940. When the armistices went into effect, Pascal was on patrol in the Mediterranean Sea south of the Strait of Messina.

==== Vichy France ====
After France's surrender, Pascal served in the naval forces of Vichy France, initially remained assigned to the 4th Submarine Division at Bizerte. By 1 August 1940, she had been reassigned along with Henri Poincaré to the 5th Submarine Division at Bizerte.

As of 1 January 1942, Pascal was assigned to the 5th Submarine Division at Casablanca in French Morocco along with Fresnel, Henri Poincaré, and their sister ship Actéon. In early 1942, she departed French Morocco to undergo a major overhaul at La Ciotat, France. The overhaul took eight months, during which time she was placed under guard in a disarmed and unfueled state in accordance with the terms of the Armistice of 22 June 1940. After Allied forces landed in French North Africa on 8 November 1942 in Operation Torch, she was authorized to rearm for the defense of Toulon, France, against Allied attack. Her refit was completed on 16 November 1942.

Moored at Berth 9 at the Darse Nord du Mourillon at Toulon with her diesel engines still disassembled, Pascal was not able get underway when Germany and Italy occupied the Free Zone (French: Zone libre) of Vichy France on 27 November 1942, and she was among the French vessels scuttled at Toulon to prevent their seizure by Germany when German forces entered Toulon that day. She sank before German troops could reach her and attempt to prevent her scuttling.

==== Italy and Germany ====
The Germans seized Pascal and handed her over to the Italians, who refloated her on either 20 January 1943 or 5 June 1943, according to different sources. The Germans seized her when Italy surrendered to the Allies and switched to the Allied side in accordance with the terms of the Armistice of Cassibile on 9 September 1943. The Germans declared her unusable. Allied aircraft sank her at Toulon on 11 March 1944.
