= French submarine Le Centaure =

Le Centaure
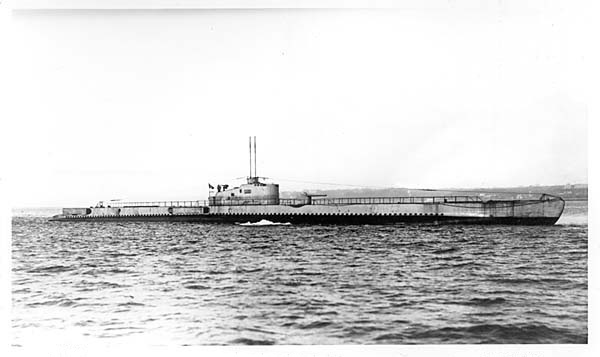
- Le Centaure′s sister ship Ajax in 1930.

History

France
- Name: Le Centaure
- Namesake: Centaur, a creature from Greek mythology with the upper body of a human and the lower body and legs of a horse
- Operator: French Navy
- Builder: Arsenal de Brest, Brest, France
- Laid down: 1 August 1929
- Launched: 14 October 1932
- Commissioned: 1 January 1935
- Decommissioned: 19 June 1952
- Home port: Brest, France

General characteristics
- Class & type: Redoutable-class submarine
- Displacement: 1,572 tonnes (1,547 long tons) (surfaced); 2,092 tonnes (2,059 long tons) (submerged)
- Length: 92.3 m (302 ft 10 in)
- Beam: 8.1 m (26 ft 7 in)
- Draft: 4.4 m (14 ft 5 in) (surfaced)
- Propulsion: 2 × diesel engines, 6,000 hp (4,474 kW); 2 × electric motors, 2,250 hp (1,678 kW)
- Speed: 17.5 kn (32.4 km/h; 20.1 mph) (surfaced); 10 kn (19 km/h; 12 mph) (submerged)
- Range: 14,000 nmi (26,000 km; 16,000 mi) at 7 kn (13 km/h; 8.1 mph) (surfaced); 10,000 nmi (19,000 km; 12,000 mi) at 10 kn (19 km/h; 12 mph) (surfaced); 4,000 nmi (7,400 km; 4,600 mi) at 17 kn (31 km/h; 20 mph) (surfaced); 90 nmi (170 km; 100 mi) at 7 kn (13 km/h; 8.1 mph) (submerged)
- Test depth: 80 m (262 ft)
- Complement: 5 officers (6 in operations); 66 men
- Armament: 11 torpedo tubes; 1 × 100 mm (3.9 in) gun; 1 × 13.2 mm (0.5 in) machine gun

Le Centaure was a French Navy Redoutable-class submarine of the M6 series commissioned in 1935. She participated in World War II, first on the side of the Allies from 1939 to June 1940, then in the navy of Vichy France until November 1942. She then returned to the Allied side, operating as part of the Free French Naval Forces. Along with Archimède, Argo, Casabianca, and Le Glorieux, she was one of only five out of the 31 Redoutable-class submarines to survive the war. She remained in French Navy service after World War II, and was decommissioned in 1952.

== Characteristics ==
Profile of Casabianca, sister ship of Le Centaure.

Le Centaure was part of a fairly homogeneous series of 31 deep-sea patrol submarines also called "1,500-tonners" because of their displacement. All entered service between 1931 and 1939.

The Redoutable-class submarines were 92.3 metres (302 ft 10 in) long and 8.1 metres (26 ft 7 in) in beam and had a draft of 4.4 metres (14 ft 5 in). They could dive to a depth of 80 metres (262 ft). They displaced 1,572 tonnes (1,547 long tons) on the surface and 2,082 tonnes (2,049 long tons) underwater. Propelled on the surface by two diesel engines producing a combined 6,000 horsepower (4,474 kW), they had a maximum speed of 18.6 knots (34.4 km/h; 21.4 mph). When submerged, their two electric motors produced a combined 2,250 horsepower (1,678 kW) and allowed them to reach 10 knots (19 km/h; 12 mph). Also called "deep-cruising submarines", their range on the surface was 10,000 nautical miles (19,000 km; 12,000 mi) at 10 knots (19 km/h; 12 mph). Underwater, they could travel 100 nautical miles (190 km; 120 mi) at 5 knots (9.3 km/h; 5.8 mph).

== Construction and commissioning ==
Le Centaure was authorized under the 1929 naval program and was laid down along with her sister ship Le Héros at Arsenal de Brest in Brest, France, on 1 August 1929 with the hull number Q169. Work was halted on 11 August 1930, but construction later resumed and she was launched on 14 October 1932. She completed fitting out for her sea trials on 1 December 1933, successfully finished her trials on 14 March 1934, and completed fitting out on 1 August 1934. Declared complete on 31 August 1934, she was commissioned on 1 January 1935.

== Service history ==
=== 1935–1939 ===
Le Centaure lost a member of her crew on 2 August 1938.

=== World War II ===
==== French Navy ====
At the start of World War II in September 1939, Le Centaure was assigned to the 4th Submarine Division in the 4th Submarine Squadron of the 2nd Squadron, home-ported at Brest and based at Casablanca in French Morocco. Her sister ships Argo, Henri Poincaré, and Pascal made up the rest of the division.

The French assigned the responsibility for the defense of the coast of French Morocco to the 4th Submarine Division, and Le Centaure and the division's other submarines began patrols off French Morocco on 3 September 1939, the day France entered World War II on the side of the Allies. In response to a request by the British, Le Centaure and Argo got underway from Casablanca on 19 September 1939 to assist the British – who had only two submarines available for the task – in reconnoitering the Azores and the Canary Islands, where the Allies suspected German merchant ships had taken refuge upon the outbreak of war and were serving as supply ships for German U-boats. The reconnaissance effort revealed the presence of many German merchant ships.

As of 6 February 1940, the 4th Submarine Division still was assigned to Casablanca. In April 1940 the French Navy established the new 4th Flotilla at Bizerte in Tunisia and assigned Le Centaure, Argo, Henri Poincaré, and Pascal to it along with their sister ships Fresnel, Le Conquérant, Le Glorieux, L'Espoir, Le Héros, Le Tonnant, Monge, Pégase, and Vengeur.

German ground forces advanced into France on 10 May 1940, beginning the Battle of France, and Italy declared war on France on 10 June 1940 and joined the invasion. From 11 to 13 June 1940, Le Centaure, Fresnel, and Vengeur conducted surveillance patrols off Bizerte. On 13 June, Le Centaure and Pascal got underway for a patrol south of Sardinia between 38 degrees 10 minutes North and 38 degrees 30 minutes North, but sighted no ships. Le Centaure and Henri Poincaré patrolled southeast of the Strait of Messina between 16 and 25 June 1940, again without success, although Le Centaure attempted to approach Italian ships off the Regia Marina (Italian Royal Navy) base at Augusta, Sicily on at least one occasion, one source claiming she tried to close with a group of Italian ships on 20 and 21 June and another that she tried to approach three Italian cruisers entering the port at dawn on 22 June 1940. The Battle of France ended in France's defeat and armistices with Germany and with Italy that went into effect on 25 June 1940, and Le Centaure returned to Bizerte at 06:40 that day.

==== Vichy France ====
After the French surrender, Le Centaure served in the naval forces of Vichy France. She proceeded from Bizerte to Toulon, where at the end of June 1940 she was disarmed, defueled, and placed under guard in accordance with the terms of the armistice.

On 12 November 1941, Le Centaure and her sister ship Bévéziers were designated to relieve Monge and Pégase on overseas stations. Le Centaure was rearmed in December 1941. She proceeded to Bizerte, then in January 1942 moved to Casablanca, where she was based with Argo. On 16 August 1942, Le Centaure and Argo were transferred to Dakar in Senegal. At Dakar, they joined their sister ship Archimède in forming the 3rd Submarine Division.

==== Free French Naval Forces ====
Le Centaure was still in the 3rd Submarine Division at Dakar as of 1 November 1942. After Allied forces landed in French North Africa in Operation Torch on 8 November 1942 and a ceasefire between Allied and Vichy French forces in North Africa ensued on 11 November 1942, Le Centaure joined the Free French Naval Forces. Le Centaure, Argo, Archimède, Casabianca, and Le Glorieux were the best Free French submarines,

Le Centaure′s initial assignment in the Free French Naval Forces was to a Royal Navy sound school at Freetown in Sierra Leone, where she alternated with Argo in serving as a target for British warships engaged in antisubmarine warfare training. She then was among French submarines sent to the United States for overhaul and modernization. She proceeded to Philadelphia, Pennsylvania, where she arrived in May 1944. Work on her then began at the Philadelphia Navy Yard at League Island. The lack of a detailed plan of the Redoutable class and their parts hampered the shipyard′s work, and American engineers expressed frustration at the lack of standardization among the four Redoutable-class submarines at Philadelphia: For example, two had Schneider diesel engines and two had Sulzer diesels. However, they also noted that the Redoutable-class remained quite modern despite their 20-year-old design.

At Philadelphia, Le Centaure′s Schneider diesel engines underwent a full overhaul, her batteries were replaced, her hull was thickened and her diving planes reinforced to increase her test depth, and some of her ballast tanks were transformed into fuel tanks to increase her range. A significant effort went into improving her soundproofing, and radars, more efficient listening gear, a sonar, a new pitometer log, a new bathythermograph, air conditioning, and a refrigerator were installed aboard her. Her conning tower was modified, with the removal of the 13.2-millimetre machine gun and a significant part of the navigation shelter and its replacement by a new gun mount for an Oerlikon 20mm anti-aircraft gun.

The Philadelphia Navy Yard completed Le Centaure′s overhaul on 10 December 1944. She returned to Casablanca at the end of January 1945. According to one source, she was back in Bermuda in February 1945, but by March 1945 she was at Oran in French Algeria, where she spent the rest of World War II in training with Archiméde, Casabianca, Le Glorieux, and destroyers in preparation for a transfer to the Pacific Ocean to participate in the war with Japan. The surrender of Japan on 2 September 1945 brought the war to an end before she could deploy to the Pacific.

=== Post-World War II ===
Le Centaure and Casabianca made a cruise along the coast of Africa between April and December 1946. After a stay in Toulon, France, they returned to Brest on 31 January 1947 to undergo a major refit. Their refits were canceled in June 1947, and instead they were placed in special reserve on 1 December 1947. Le Centaure was decommissioned on 19 June 1952.
