= French submarine Le Glorieux =

World War II French submarine

Le Glorieux
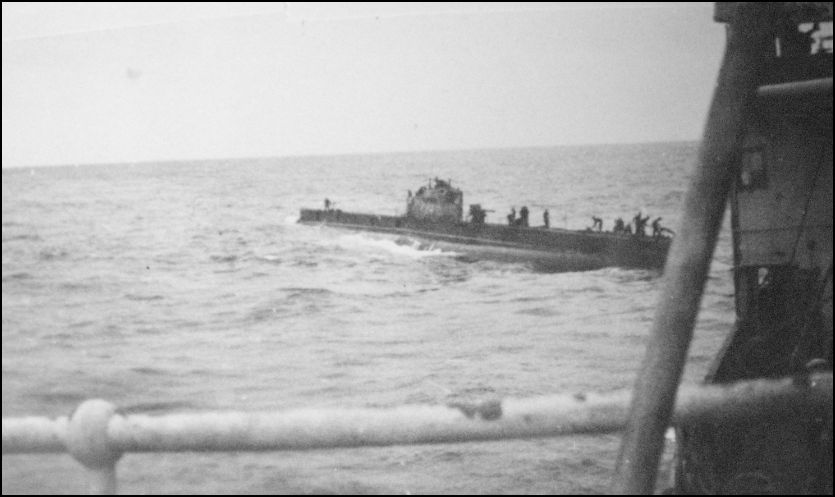
- Le Glorieux taking aboard food and fuel from the auxiliary cruiser Quercy on 20 June 1942.

History

France
- Name: Le Glorieux
- Namesake: Glorious, having glory, i.e., high renown, praise, and honor obtained through notable achievements and based in extensive common consent
- Operator: French Navy
- Builder: Arsenal de Cherbourg, Cherbourg, France
- Laid down: 10 February 1930
- Launched: 29 November 1932
- Commissioned: 1 June 1934
- Decommissioned: 27 October 1952
- Honors and awards: Resistance Medal

General characteristics
- Class & type: Redoutable-class submarine
- Displacement: 1,572 tonnes (1,547 long tons) (surfaced); 2,092 tonnes (2,059 long tons) (submerged)
- Length: 92.3 m (302 ft 10 in)
- Beam: 8.1 m (26 ft 7 in)
- Draft: 4.4 m (14 ft 5 in) (surfaced)
- Propulsion: 2 × diesel engines, 6,000 hp (4,474 kW); 2 × electric motors, 2,250 hp (1,678 kW)
- Speed: 17.5 kn (32.4 km/h; 20.1 mph) (surfaced); 10 kn (19 km/h; 12 mph) (submerged)
- Range: 14,000 nmi (26,000 km; 16,000 mi) at 7 kn (13 km/h; 8.1 mph) (surfaced); 10,000 nmi (19,000 km; 12,000 mi) at 10 kn (19 km/h; 12 mph) (surfaced); 4,000 nmi (7,400 km; 4,600 mi) at 17 kn (31 km/h; 20 mph) (surfaced); 90 nmi (170 km; 100 mi) at 7 kn (13 km/h; 8.1 mph) (submerged)
- Test depth: 80 m (262 ft)
- Complement: 5 officers (6 in operations); 66 men
- Armament: 11 torpedo tubes; 1 × 100 mm (3.9 in) gun; 1 × 13.2 mm (0.5 in) machine gun

Le Glorieux (Glorious) was a French Navy Redoutable-class submarine of the M6 series commissioned in 1934. She participated in World War II, first on the side of the Allies from 1939 to June 1940, then in the navy of Vichy France until November 1942. She then returned to the Allied side, operating as part of the Free French Naval Forces. Along with Archimède, Argo, Casabianca, and Le Centaure, she was one of only five out of the 31 Redoutable-class submarines to survive the war. She remained in French Navy service after World War II, and was decommissioned in 1952.

== Characteristics ==
Profile of Casabianca, sister ship of Le Glorieux.

Le Glorieux was part of a fairly homogeneous series of 31 deep-sea patrol submarines also called "1,500-tonners" because of their displacement. All entered service between 1931 and 1939.

The Redoutable-class submarines were 92.3 metres (302 ft 10 in) long and 8.1 metres (26 ft 7 in) in beam and had a draft of 4.4 metres (14 ft 5 in). They could dive to a depth of 80 metres (262 ft). They displaced 1,572 tonnes (1,547 long tons) on the surface and 2,082 tonnes (2,049 long tons) underwater. Propelled on the surface by two diesel engines producing a combined 6,000 horsepower (4,474 kW), they had a maximum speed of 18.6 knots (34.4 km/h; 21.4 mph). When submerged, their two electric motors produced a combined 2,250 horsepower (1,678 kW) and allowed them to reach 10 knots (19 km/h; 12 mph). Also called "deep-cruising submarines", their range on the surface was 10,000 nautical miles (19,000 km; 12,000 mi) at 10 knots (19 km/h; 12 mph). Underwater, they could travel 100 nautical miles (190 km; 120 mi) at 5 knots (9.3 km/h; 5.8 mph).

Le Glorieux, Casabianca, and Sfax were the only Redoutable-class submarines equipped with a radio direction finder.

== Construction and commissioning ==
Laid down at Arsenal de Cherbourg in Cherbourg, France, on 10 February 1930 with the hull number Q168, Le Glorieux was launched on 29 November 1932. She was commissioned on 1 June 1934.

== Service history ==
=== 1934–1939 ===
As on all French submarines, Le Glorieux′s folding radio masts was removed in 1937 and replaced with a hoisting periscopic antenna.

=== World War II ===
==== French Navy ====
At the start of World War II on 1 September 1939, Le Glorieux was assigned to the 1st Submarine Division in the 2nd Submarine Squadron of the 1st Flotilla of the 3rd Squadron, based at Toulon, France. Her sister ships Le Conquérant, Le Héros, and Le Tonnant made up the rest of the division. Between 12 October and 3 November 1939, she patrolled with her sister ship Redoutable along the coast of Madeira, where part of the German merchant fleet — which the Allies suspected of serving as supply ships for German U-boats – had taken refuge when the war broke out. She conducted two patrols, and the only significant incident occurred when the British cargo ship Egba refused to stop for inspection even after Le Glorieux fired warning shots.

On 7 February 1940, the 1st Submarine Division was assigned to the base at Dakar in Senegal. On 17 February 1940 (or in March 1940, according to one source) Le Glorieux and Le Tonnant received orders to escort the British cargo ship SS Hartismere, which had suffered machinery damage, to Freetown in Sierra Leone, but the two submarines did not find the ship due to bad information, and they returned to Dakar. On 29 February 1940, Le Glorieux got underway from Freetown with Le Tonnant and the British Royal Navy destroyers HMS Dainty and HMS Diamond for antisubmarine warfare exercises, which took place northwest of Freetown on 1 March 1940.

On 11 April 1940, Le Glorieux, Le Conquérant, and Le Tonnant took part in exercises off Dakar with the Royal Navy destroyer HMS Decoy. In April 1940, the 1st Submarine Division was transferred to Bizerte in Tunisia, but Le Glorieux and Le Héros remained at Dakar.

German ground forces advanced into France on 10 May 1940, beginning the Battle of France, and Italy declared war on France on 10 June 1940 and joined the invasion. The Battle of France ended in France's defeat and armistices with Germany on 22 June 1940 and with Italy on 24 June, both of which went into effect on 25 June 1940. Le Glorieux and Le Héros were at Dakar that day.

==== Vichy France ====
After France's surrender, Le Glorieux served in the naval forces of Vichy France. After the attack on Mers-el-Kébir — in which a British Royal Navy squadron attacked a French Navy squadron moored at the naval base at Mers El Kébir in Oran on the coast of Algeria on 3 July 1940 — Le Glorieux and Le Héros got underway from Dakar at 04:30 on 4 July 1940 in company with a Latécoère 302 flying boat to retaliate by attacking the British heavy cruiser HMS Dorsetshire, which was patrolling south of Dakar. The flying boat found Dorsetshire and guided the submarines to her, but the submarines could get no closer to her than 6,000 metres (6,600 yd). They received orders at 16:00 to return to Dakar. During their return voyage, a seaplane from Dorsetshre attacked them, narrowly missing Le Glorieux with two bombs.

On 7 July 1940, a British naval force arrived off Dakar and, as a part of Operation Catapult, transmitted an ultimatum at 18:00. The French did not reply, and ordered Le Glorieux and Le Héros to put to sea. Many members of their crews initially refused to fight the British, but the commanding officer of Le Héros convinced them to participate in the sortie. The two submarines got underway to conduct the attack, but sources differ on the details of what followed. According to one account, they left Dakar together and anchored southeast of the island of Gorée at 21:30 on 7 July, then set off to attack the British squadron on 8 July 1940, a French sloop-of-war mistakenly opening fire on them as they departed, and submerged off Dakar at 11:20. In another version of the events, Le Héros was still moored in Dakar on 8 July and got underway at dawn that day, while Le Glorieux departed a few hours later; mistaken for a British submarine attempting to infiltrate the harbor, Le Glorieux suffered some light damage when she came under heavy gunfire from three French ships and was bombed by a French seaplane. In any event, both submarines remained submerged off Dakar all day and attempted to attack the British ships off Dakar but could not get close enough, and the British departed the area and headed for Freetown after Fleet Air Arm Fairey Swordfish torpedo bombers from the aircraft carrier HMS Hermes attacked and seriously damaged the French battleship Richelieu at Dakar on 8 July. Both submarines returned to Dakar during the night of 8–9 July 1940, and Le Glorieux entered drydock at Dakar on 9 July for repairs.

By 8 August 1940, Le Glorieux and Le Héros were at Casablanca in French Morocco, and they later proceeded to Toulon, where they were placed under guard and maintained in a disarmed and unfueled status under the terms of the 1940 armistice. On 1 June 1941 they began training for a deployment to Dakar and from there to Madagascar in the Indian Ocean. During training, Le Glorieux collided with the accommodation hulk Condorcet on 10 September 1941, suffering damage to her stern which required ten days of repair work and delayed her departure. Le Glorieux and Le Héros departed Toulon on 28 September 1941 and, after stops at Oran from 1 to 3 October and Casablanca from 5 to 7 October, arrived on 12 October 1941 at Dakar, where they both entered drydock from 15 to 19 October 1941 for hull cleaning.

In October 1941, the British boarded and captured a convoy of four Vichy French cargo ships en route to Dakar. To retaliate, the French ordered Le Glorieux and Le Héros to attack British trade routes along the coast of South Africa. The two submarines got underway from Dakar in company with a convoy on 27 October 1941 to continue their journey to Madagascar. They were off Cape Town, South Africa, on 14 November 1941. On either 15 or 16 November 1941, according to different sources, one of the submarines attacked the 4,000-gross register ton cargo ship Capo Olmo, some sources claiming that Le Glorieux fired two torpedoes at her south of the Cape of Good Hope off Port Elizabeth, South Africa, at 35°40′S 019°20′E and that both missed, others that Le Héros made the attack during a storm on 16 November 1940 and claimed to have sunk Cap Olmo. On 17 November, Le Glorieux was off Durban, South Africa. Le Glorieux and Le Héros rendezvoused off Fort-Dauphin on the southern coast of Madagascar on 23 November 1941 and proceeded to Diego-Suarez, Madagascar, which they reached in poor condition on 27 November 1941 after a journey of 7,000 nautical miles (13,000 km; 8,100 mi).

At the end of December 1941, Le Glorieux escorted an aviso on a supply mission from Madagascar to Djibouti in French Somaliland, which the Allies were blockading. She and her sister ship Vengeur sortied from Djibouti on 31 December 1941 and on 6, 13, and 16 January 1942 to protect barge convoys making the passage between Djibouti and Obock, French Somaliland. From 16 to 20 January 1942, Vengeur, Le Glorieux, and the aviso D'Iberville conducted a patrol in the Gulf of Aden, after which Vengeur and D'Iberville parted company with Le Glorieux and Le Glorieux remained on patrol alone until 23 December 1941, when she returned to Djibouti for a stay that lasted until 19 February 1942.

Le Glorieux departed Djibouti on 19 February 1942 in company with the auxiliary cruiser Bougainville bound for Diego-Suarez, which they reached without incident. Le Glorieux remained at Diego-Suarez until 14 April 1942, when she got underway to proceed to Hell-Ville on the island of Nosy Be off the northwest coast of Madagascar, which she reached on 15 April. She remained anchored at Hell-Ville on alert duty until 26 April 1942, except for a short training excursion at sea on 23 April 1942. On 26 April 1942 she proceeded to Majunga, a port on the west coast of Madagascar 350 miles (560 km) southwest of Diego-Suarez, where she arrived on 27 April to use her diesel engines to generate electricity for a cement plant so it could resume operations after suffering mechanical damage.

Fearing a Japanese attack on Madagascar, which would compromise India's security and supplies, the British invaded Madagascar, beginning with amphibious landings near Diego-Suarez at dawn on 5 May 1942. Le Glorieux immediately embarked crew members who were ashore and got underway from Majunga at 10:35 for a patrol area off Courrier Bay on the northwest coast of Madagascar near Cap d'Ambre, Madagascar's northern tip. At 10:00 on 6 May 1942, she closed to within 10,000 to 12,000 metres (10,900 to 13,100 yd) of the British aircraft carrier HMS Indomitable, but was unable to reach an attack position. A British destroyer passed Le Glorieux at 15:38 but did not attempt a depth-charge attack. On 7 May 1942, with the British having seized Diego-Suarez, Le Glorieux received orders to withdraw and rendezvous with D'Iberville at Androka on the southwestern coast of Madagascar.

Le Glorieux began refueling at Androka on 17 May 1942. She completing loading 160 tonnes (160 long tons; 180 short tons) of diesel fuel on 21 May 1942, and departed Androka that day in company with D'Iberville to head for Dakar, which they reached on 16 June 1942. Le Glorieux then continued on to Toulon, where she arrived on either 12 July or 1 August 1942, according to different sources. In accordance with the terms of the 1940 armistice, she was placed under guard at Toulon and maintained in a disarmed and unfueled status. On 1 November 1942, she was part of the 1st Submarine Group along with her sister ships Achéron, L'Espoir, and Vengeur.

Allied forces landed in French North Africa in Operation Torch on 8 November 1942, and on 9 November the Armistice Commission authorized Le Glorieux and several other French submarines – her sister ships Casabianca and Redoutable as well as the submarines Diamant, Iris, Naïade, Thétis, and Vénus and, according to one source, Le Glorieux′s sister ships Henri Poincaré and Pascal as well – to rearm. Germany and Italy occupied the Free Zone (French: Zone libre) of Vichy France on 27 November 1942, and German forces entered the naval base at Toulon that day, prompting the scuttling of the French fleet there. Among the Redoutable-class submarines at Toulon, only Le Glorieux and Casabianca had embarked new batteries and provisions and fully refueled when the Germans arrived. At the sound of the first gunshots, they and Iris, Vénus, and the submarine Marsouin cast off from Le Mourillon between 05:00 and 05:15 and made a run for the open sea under fire by German forces.

The submarines spent the rest of the day submerged south of Toulon, then surfaced after dark to decide on their next moves, some opting to head for Algiers in Algeria and others – including Le Glorieux — for Spain. Le Glorieux arrived first off Barcelona on 28 November 1942 – at 16:00 according to one source – and remained submerged all day off the port but did not enter it, her commanding officer deciding that Barcelona lay too close to enemy forces and was too difficult to exit. She surfaced after dark and proceeded to Valencia, where she arrived at 07:00 on 29 November 1942. Meeting a curt reception by Fascist authorities in Spain – who seized Iris after her arrival in Barcelona on 28 November — and having received orders from the High Commissioner of France in Africa, Admiral François Darlan, to proceed to Algiers, Le Glorieux′s commanding officer decided to put back to sea after only a few hours in port. Le Glorieux got back underway at 11:45 on 29 November 1942 and headed for Oran, where she arrived at 08:00 on 30 November 1942.

==== Free French Naval Forces ====
After brief hostilities between Allied and Vichy French forces in French North Africa during the Torch landings, the surviving French fleet based in North Africa joined the Free French Naval Forces, as did Le Glorieux after her arrival at Oran. She was based first at Algiers, then at Oran, and then at Casablanca. In September 1943, she was sent to a United States Navy sound school at Bermuda, where she served as a submerged target for ships engaged in antisubmarine warfare training. She then became one of the French submarines sent to the United States for overhaul and modernization. She proceeded to Philadelphia, Pennsylvania, where she arrived on 1 December 1943, and work on her began at the Philadelphia Navy Yard at League Island. The lack of a detailed plan of the Redoutable class and their parts hampered the shipyard′s work, and American engineers expressed frustration at the lack of standardization among the four Redoutable-class submarines at Philadelphia – for example, two had Schneider diesel engines and two had Sulzer diesels. However, they also noted that the Redoutable-class remained quite modern despite their 20-year-old design.

At Philadelphia, Le Glorieux′s diesel engines underwent a full overhaul, her batteries were replaced, her hull was thickened and her diving planes reinforced to increase her test depth, and some of her ballast tanks were transformed into fuel tanks to increase her range. A significant effort went into improving her soundproofing, and radars, more efficient listening gear, a sonar, a new pitometer log, a new bathythermograph, air conditioning, and a refrigerator were installed aboard her. Her conning tower was modified, with the removal of a significant part of the navigation shelter and its replacement by a new gun mount for an Oerlikon 20mm anti-aircraft gun.

After the completion of the work. Le Glorieux returned to North Africa at the end of May 1944. On 27 July 1944, Chairman of the Provisional Government of the French Republic Charles de Gaulle ordered Le Glorieux and her sister ship Archimède to prepare for a transfer to the Pacific Ocean to participate in the war with Japan, with a target date of 15 November 1944 for their departure, but Vice admiral André Lemonnier argued successfully that the two submarines were too old for such remote service, and the plan for them to operate in East Asian waters was dropped.

The Allied invasion of Southern France, Operation Dragoon, which began on 15 August 1944, brought the war in the Mediterranean to an end before Le Glorieux could see further combat. In December 1944, she joined Archimède and the submarine La Sultane in generating electric power at Toulon while their crews were on leave. She also operated as a submerged target for antisubmarine warfare training at sound schools. She was at Oran when the surrender of Japan on 2 September 1945 brought World War II to an end.

=== Post-World War II ===
Le Glorieux and Archimède began a major refit at Cherbourg in January 1946. They emerged from the shipyard in November 1946 with a test depth of 120 metres (394 ft), an increase of 40 metres (131 ft) over their original design, thanks to modifications made both at Philadelphia in 1943–1944 and at Cherbourg in 1946. Le Glorieux was awarded the Resistance Medal on 29 November 1946.

After completing post-refit sea trials at the beginning of 1947, Le Glorieux and Archimède were based at Brest, France, in January 1947. They made a four-month cruise in African waters in company with U-2518, a German Type XXI submarine transferred to the French Navy after World War II to allow France to assess the Type XXI's revolutionary capabilities.

From 1947 to 1949, Le Glorieux and Archimède carried out extensive training, first at Brest and then at Toulon. In 1949, Le Glorieux was used in filming the 1951 movie Casabianca — released in the United States in 1952 with the title Pirate Submarine — portraying her sister ship Casabianca. She was placed in "Special Reserve" B on 16 October 1950. The last Redoutable-class submarine in service, she was decommissioned on 27 October 1952.

== Honors and awards ==
- Resistance Medal 29 November 1946
