= French submarine Argo =

1927 French Navy submarine

Argo
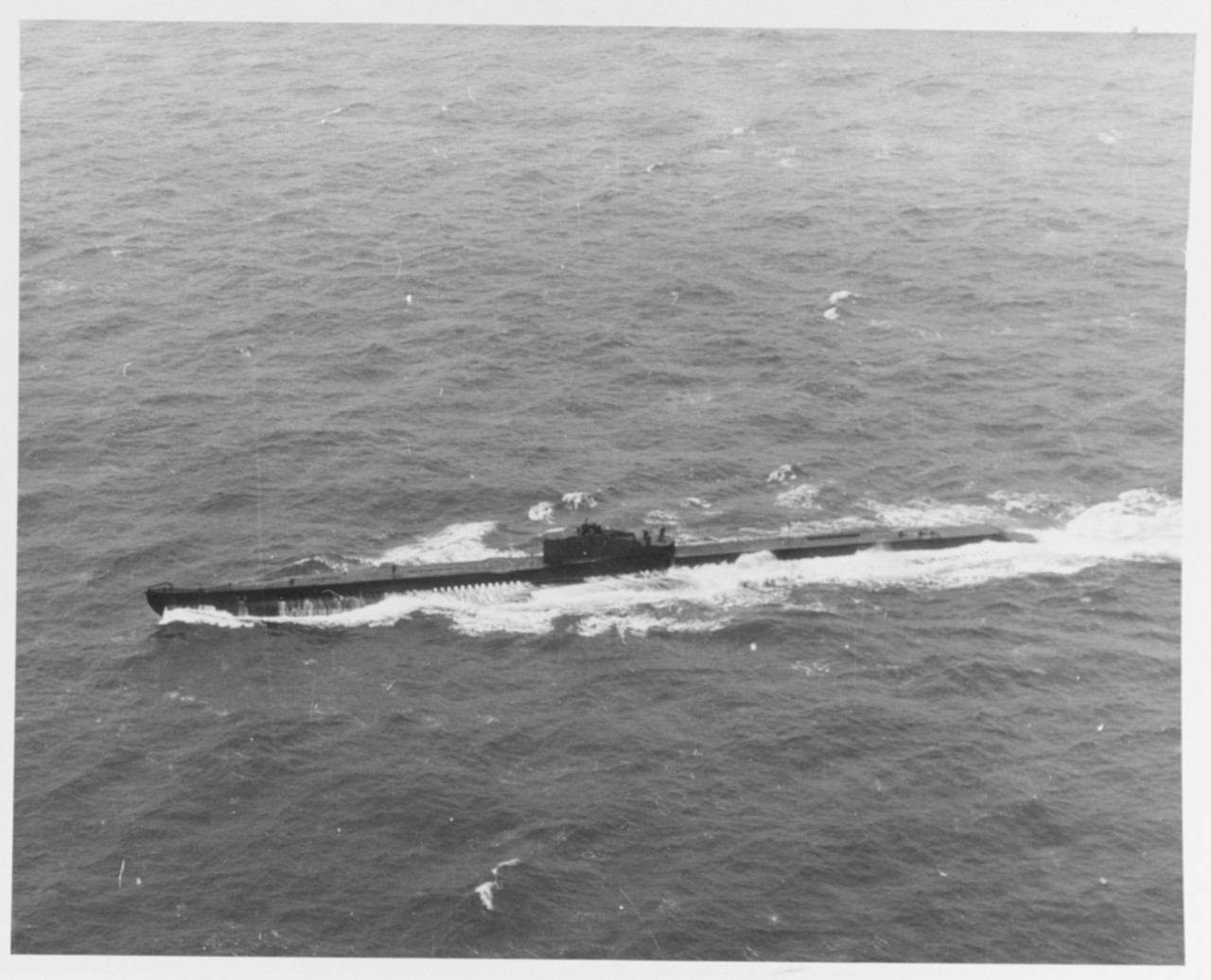
- Argo in the Atlantic Ocean off the United States East Coast on 19 November 1944.

History

France
- Name: Argo
- Namesake: Argo, the ship used by Jason and the Argonauts in Greek mythology
- Operator: French Navy
- Builder: Chantiers Dubigeon, Nantes, France
- Laid down: 25 August 1927
- Launched: 11 April 1929
- Commissioned: 12 February 1933
- Home port: Brest, France
- Fate: Disarmed 26 April 1946

General characteristics
- Class & type: Redoutable-class submarine
- Displacement: 1,572 tonnes (1,547 long tons) (surfaced); 2,092 tonnes (2,059 long tons) (submerged)
- Length: 92.3 m (302 ft 10 in)
- Beam: 8.1 m (26 ft 7 in)
- Draft: 4.4 m (14 ft 5 in) (surfaced)
- Propulsion: 2 × diesel engines, 6,000 hp (4,474 kW); 2 × electric motors, 2,250 hp (1,678 kW)
- Speed: 17.5 kn (32.4 km/h; 20.1 mph) (surfaced); 10 kn (19 km/h; 12 mph) (submerged)
- Range: 14,000 nmi (26,000 km; 16,000 mi) at 7 kn (13 km/h; 8.1 mph) (surfaced); 10,000 nmi (19,000 km; 12,000 mi) at 10 kn (19 km/h; 12 mph) (surfaced); 4,000 nmi (7,400 km; 4,600 mi) at 17 kn (31 km/h; 20 mph) (surfaced); 90 nmi (170 km; 100 mi) at 7 kn (13 km/h; 8.1 mph) (submerged)
- Test depth: 80 m (262 ft)
- Complement: 5 officers (6 in operations); 66 men
- Armament: 11 torpedo tubes; 1 × 100 mm (3.9 in) gun; 1 × 13.2 mm (0.5 in) machine gun

Argo was a French Navy Redoutable-class submarine of the M6 series commissioned in 1933. She participated in World War II, first on the side of the Allies from 1939 to June 1940, then in the navy of Vichy France until November 1942, and finally in the Free French Naval Forces through the end of the war. Along with Archimède, Casabianca, Le Centaure, and Le Glorieux, she was one of only five out of the 31 Redoutable-class submarines to survive the war.

== Characteristics ==
Profile of Casabianca, sister ship of Argo.

Argo was part of a fairly homogeneous series of 31 deep-sea patrol submarines also called "1,500-tonners" because of their displacement. All entered service between 1931 and 1939.

The Redoutable-class submarines were 92.3 metres (302 ft 10 in) long and 8.1 metres (26 ft 7 in) in beam and had a draft of 4.4 metres (14 ft 5 in). They could dive to a depth of 80 metres (262 ft). They displaced 1,572 tonnes (1,547 long tons) on the surface and 2,082 tonnes (2,049 long tons) underwater. Propelled on the surface by two diesel engines producing a combined 6,000 horsepower (4,474 kW), they had a maximum speed of 18.6 knots (34.4 km/h; 21.4 mph). When submerged, their two electric motors produced a combined 2,250 horsepower (1,678 kW) and allowed them to reach 10 knots (19 km/h; 12 mph). Also called "deep-cruising submarines", their range on the surface was 10,000 nautical miles (19,000 km; 12,000 mi) at 10 knots (19 km/h; 12 mph). Underwater, they could travel 100 nautical miles (190 km; 120 mi) at 5 knots (9.3 km/h; 5.8 mph).

== Construction and commissioning ==
Laid down at Chantiers Dubigeon in Nantes, France, on 25 August 1927 with the hull number Q151, Argo was launched on 11 April 1929. She was commissioned on 12 February 1933.

== Service history ==
=== World War II ===
==== French Navy ====
At the start of World War II in September 1939, Argo was assigned to the 4th Submarine Division based in Brest, France. Her sister ships Henri Poincaré, Le Centaure, and Pascal made up the rest of the division.

Part of the German merchant fleet — which the Allies suspected of serving as supply ships for German U-boats – took refuge in both the Azores and the Canary Islands at the start of the war, and on either 3 or 19 September 1939, according to different sources, Argo and Le Centaure began patrols off the Azores and the Canary Islands in search of German submarines and their supply ships. On 6 February 1940, the 4th Submarine Division was reassigned to Casablanca in French Morocco. In April 1940, Argo became part of the 4th Submarine Flotilla, based at Bizerte in Tunisia.

German ground forces advanced into France on 10 May 1940, beginning the Battle of France, and Italy declared war on France on 10 June 1940 and joined the invasion. The Battle of France ended in France's defeat and armistices with Germany on 22 June 1940 and with Italy on 24 June, both of which went into effect on 25 June 1940.

==== Vichy France ====
After the French surrender, Argo served in the naval forces of Vichy France. On 12 March 1942 she returned to Casablanca. During operations off the coast of French Morocco, she called at Safi from 28 March to 2 April 1942 and with Le Centaure at Mogador from 5 to 7 May 1942. She ran aground in fog while entering port at Casablanca on 5 July 1942 and suffered hull damage that kept her out of service for several weeks while undergoing repairs.

In August 1942, Argo transferred to French West Africa, departing Casablanca on 10 August 1942 in company with Le Centaure and their sister ship Archimède and arriving on 16 August 1942 at Dakar in Senegal, where the three submarines formed the 3rd Submarine Division. By 9 November 1942, she was part of the French West Africa Submarine Group.

==== Free French Naval Forces ====
After Allied forces landed in French North Africa in Operation Torch in November 1942, Argo joined the Free French Naval Forces. Argo, Archimède, Le Centaure, and their sister ships Casabianca and Le Glorieux were the best Free French submarines, and Argo was among French submarines selected to be sent to the United States for overhaul and modernization. However, she was deemed too worn-out for a complete overhaul, and these plans were cancelled. Instead, she was assigned along with Le Centaure to the sound school at Freetown, Sierra Leone, where the two submarines took part in antisubmarine warfare training for British warships, serving as training targets.

In September 1943 Argo was detached to the United States Navy′s sound schools, first at Bermuda, then at New London, Connecticut, and later at Key West, Florida. Although far from the combat zone, sound-school operations were very wearing on the French crews and their equipment, requiring the submarines to operate at sea 23 days per month as training targets. Argo collided with the U.S. Navy Tacoma-class frigate USS Huron (PF-19) off Key West on 28 April 1945, suffering damage to both of her periscopes.

After Germany surrendered on 8 May 1945, the need for antisubmarine warfare training in the Atlantic dropped sharply, and French submarines operating at U.S. Navy sound schools were soon returned to French operational control. They departed U.S. ports for bases in French North Africa in July 1945. World War II ended with the surrender of Japan on 2 September 1945, and Argo was disarmed on 26 April 1946.
