= French submarine Archimède (Q142) =

Archimède
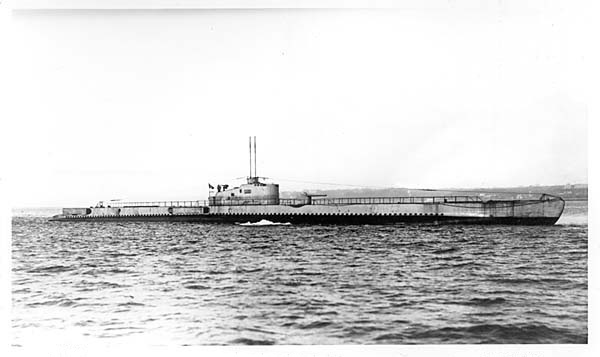
- Archimède′s sister ship Ajax in 1930

History

France
- Name: Archimède
- Namesake: Archimedes (ca. 287 BC–212 BC), Greek mathematician, physicist, engineer, astronomer, and inventor
- Operator: French Navy
- Builder: Chantiers Navals Français, Blainville-sur-Orne, Caen, France
- Laid down: 1 August 1927
- Launched: 6 September 1930
- Commissioned: 22 December 1932
- Decommissioned: 19 February 1952
- Home port: Cherbourg, France

General characteristics
- Class & type: Redoutable-class submarine
- Displacement: 1,572 tonnes (1,547 long tons) (surfaced); 2,092 tonnes (2,059 long tons) (submerged)
- Length: 92.3 m (302 ft 10 in)
- Beam: 8.1 m (26 ft 7 in)
- Draft: 4.4 m (14 ft 5 in) (surfaced)
- Propulsion: 2 × diesel engines, 6,000 hp (4,474 kW); 2 × electric motors, 2,250 hp (1,678 kW)
- Speed: 17.5 kn (32.4 km/h; 20.1 mph) (surfaced); 10 kn (19 km/h; 12 mph) (submerged)
- Range: 14,000 nmi (26,000 km; 16,000 mi) at 7 kn (13 km/h; 8.1 mph) (surfaced); 90 nmi (170 km; 100 mi) at 7 kn (13 km/h; 8.1 mph) (submerged)
- Test depth: 80 m (262 ft) (as built); 120 m (394 ft) (1946)
- Complement: 5 officers (6 in operations); 66 men
- Armament: 11 torpedo tubes; 1 × 100 mm (3.9 in) gun; 1 × 13.2 mm (0.5 in) machine gun; 1 x 20 mm antiaircraft gun (added 1944)

Archimède was a French Navy Redoutable-class submarine of the M6 series commissioned in 1932. She participated in World War II, first on the side of the Allies from 1939 to June 1940, then in the navy of Vichy France until November 1942. She then returned to the Allied side, operating as part of the Free French Naval Forces. She was one of only five – along with Argo, Casabianca, Le Centaure, and Le Glorieux — out of the 31 Redoutable-class submarines to survive the war. She remained in French Navy service after World War II, and was decommissioned in 1952.

== Characteristics ==
Profile of Casabianca, sister ship of Archimède.

Archimède was part of a fairly homogeneous series of 31 deep-sea patrol submarines also called "1,500-tonners" because of their displacement. All entered service between 1931 and 1939.

The Redoutable-class submarines were 92.3 metres (302 ft 10 in) long and 8.1 metres (26 ft 7 in) in beam and had a draft of 4.4 metres (14 ft 5 in). They could dive to a depth of 80 metres (262 ft). They displaced 1,572 tonnes (1,547 long tons) on the surface and 2,082 tonnes (2,049 long tons) underwater. Propelled on the surface by two diesel engines producing a combined 6,000 horsepower (4,474 kW), they had a maximum speed of 18.6 knots (34.4 km/h; 21.4 mph). When submerged, their two electric motors produced a combined 2,250 horsepower (1,678 kW) and allowed them to reach 10 knots (19 km/h; 12 mph). Also called "deep-cruising submarines", their range on the surface was 10,000 nautical miles (19,000 km; 12,000 mi) at 10 knots (19 km/h; 12 mph). Underwater, they could travel 100 nautical miles (190 km; 120 mi) at 5 knots (9.3 km/h; 5.8 mph).

== Construction ==
Archimède was laid down at Chantiers Navals Français at Blainville-sur-Orne in Caen, France, on 1 August 1927 with the hull number Q142. She was launched on 6 September 1930.

== Service history ==
=== Pre-World War II ===
After fitting out at Caen, Archimède moved to Cherbourg, France, to undergo pre-commissioning sea trials. While she was at Cherbourg, her sister ship Prométhée sank while making her first dive during her own trials on 7 July 1932 in the English Channel off Cape Lévi near Fermanville, France. An engineer from the Schneider-Creusot company and officers from the commission of inquiry investigating the loss of Prométhée boarded Archimède on 10 July 1932 and conducted tests aboard Archimède based on statements Prométhée′s commanding officer and other survivors made in an attempt to ascertain the reasons Prométhée sank.

After the successful completion of her trials, Archimède was commissioned on 22 December 1932. She was assigned to the 4th Submarine Division at Brest, France, and operated in the North Sea, English Channel, and Atlantic Ocean.

On 2 May 1938, Archimède lost a crewmen under what the French Navy described to the press as "special circumstances." Later in 1938, she was reassigned to the 6th Submarine Division at Bizerte in Tunisia. She made a cruise from Bizerte to Douala in French Cameroon to test the endurance of French submariners and their equipment.

On 3 February 1939, when Archimède still was assigned to the 6th Submarine Division along with her sister ships Ajax, Persée, and Poncelet, she completed a minor refit. She arrived at Casablanca in French Morocco in mid-April 1939 and from there took part in exercises until June 1939, when she returned to Brest. She conducted endurance cruises from Brest with other submarines. In mid-August 1939, she and Ajax began major overhauls.

=== World War II ===
==== French Navy ====
At the start of World War II in September 1939, Archimède still was assigned to the 6th Submarine Division based at Brest. Her sister ships Ajax, Persée, and Poncelet made up the rest of the division. Still under overhaul when the war began, she did not leave drydock until the beginning of January 1940. She began her post-overhaul sea trials at the beginning of February 1940. While she was performing diesel engine tests on 14 February 1940, fishing boats in her vicinity ignored an order excluding them from her trials area, and as a result she collided with the French 8-gross register ton fishing sloop Alize or Alizee (according to different sources), which sank off Brest with the loss of her entire crew of five. Archimède subsequently had outings in the Baie de Douarnenez on 26–27 February, 6–7 March, and 19–20 March 1940 to test equipment and train reservist crewmen.

With her trials complete, Archimède was assigned along with Ajax in mid-March 1940 to escort duty for Allied convoys. The two submarines departed Brest on 1 April 1940 and arrived at Portsmouth in the United Kingdom on 2 April. At 05:15 on 3 April 1940, Convoy OA-122 – consisting of the cargo ships Beatus, Cornish City, Humber Arm, and King Neptune, escorted by Archimède, Ajax, and the British Royal Navy destroyers HMS Antelope and HMS Vanessa — got underway from Portsmouth bound for Halifax, Nova Scotia, Canada, which it reached on 17 April 1940. While at Halifax, Archimède underwent repairs to the transmission bearing of her steering rod.

On 25 April 1940, Archimède received orders to escort Convoy HX 39 from Halifax to the United Kingdom along with the Royal Navy auxiliary cruiser HMS Voltaire. The convoy departed Halifax on 30 April 1940. Voltaire returned to Halifax on 11 May 1940, and on 12 May the convoy rendezvoused with its United Kingdom-based escorts, the Royal Navy sloop-of-war HMS Enchantress and corvette HMS Gladiolus. Archimède detached from the convoy and made for Brest, where she arrived on 14 May 1940. Meanwhile, German ground forces had advanced into France on 10 May 1940, beginning the Battle of France.

On 1 June 1940, Archimède was involved in escorting Convoy BT-47 to Casablanca. She arrived at Toulon, France, on 9 June 1940. After Italy declared war on 10 June 1940 and invaded France, Archimède departed Toulon on 13 June 1940 for the Tyrrhenian Sea to take part in Operation Vado, a French naval offensive against ports along Italy's Ligurian coast. From 19 to 24 June 1940, she patrolled off Cannes and Nice to protect the French Mediterranean coast against an Italian amphibious landing. The Battle of France ended in France's defeat and armistices with Germany on 22 June 1940 and with Italy on 24 June, both of which went into effect on 25 June 1940. Archimède was at Toulon on 25 June.

==== Vichy France ====
After France's surrender, Archimède served in the naval forces of Vichy France. When the attack on Mers-el-Kébir — in which a British Royal Navy squadron attacked a French Navy squadron moored at the naval base at Mers El Kébir in Oran on the coast of Algeria — took place on 3 July 1940, she was a part of Group A at Toulon along with her sister ships L'Espoir and Le Conquérant. The three submarines received orders that day to form a patrol line on the night of 6–7 July 1940 in the Mediterranean Sea to attack any British ships they encountered and protect Oran, the line to extend from north to south for a distance of 20 nautical miles (37 km; 23 mi) east of Alboran Island and south of Cape Palos. The three submarines got underway from Toulon at 02:45 on 4 July 1940 bound for their patrol areas at 15 knots (28 km/h; 17 mph), but were recalled to Toulon on 5 July 1940.

Archimède underwent a minor refit at Toulon from 23 August to 28 September 1940, then was maintained in a disarmed and unfueled state in accordance with the terms of the June 1940 armistice. On 21 October 1940, the armistice commission approved her rearmament, and she was rearmed on 8 November 1940. She subsequently made two short outings at sea approved by the armistice commission, the first from 21 to 23 November and the second from 5 to 6 December 1940.

On 9 December 1940, Archimède and other submarines departed Toulon in company with the Élan-class sloop-of-war Commandant Bory bound for Casablanca, where the vessels arrived on 16 December 1940. Archimède got underway from Casablanca on 26 December 1940 in company with the submarine Aurore and two torpedo boats headed for Dakar, Senegal. On 31 December 1940, she returned to Casablanca, where she was assigned to a provisional submarine division along with Aurore and the submarines Casabianca and Sidi Ferruch.

Archimède patrolled off Dakar from 8 to 11 January, from 28 to 31 January, and from 17 to 19 February 1941. She departed Dakar on 19 February and proceeded to Conakry in French Guinea, which she reached on 21 February 1941. She and Sidi Ferruch conducted a reconnaissance cruise off the coast of French Guinea from 23 to 25 February 1941, then paused briefly at Conakry on 10 March 1941 before returning to Dakar on 12 March 1941. From Dakar, she conducted patrols from 20 to 23 March, 6 to 9 April, and 21 to 24 April 1941. She departed Dakar bound for Casablanca on 10 May 1941, but returned to Dakar on 19 May.

On 21 May 1941, Archimède departed Dakar bound for Agadir, French Morocco. She returned to Casablanca on 29 May 1941, and during July and August 1941 carried out various exercises and other outings at sea from Casablanca. She also underwent repairs to her rudder from 12 to 25 July and operated off Agadir from 7 to 12 August 1941 to take part in exercises and perform surveillance operations.

On 25 September 1941, Archimède got underway from Casablanca and, after calling at Oran from 26 September to 1 October, proceeded to Toulon, which she reached on 3 October 1941. She began a major refit on 20 October 1941, and while under refit was disarmed on 5 November 1941 and placed under guard on 6 November under the terms of the 1940 armistice. Her refit was completed on either 2 or 5 February 1942, according to different sources.

In mid-June 1942, she received orders to move to French Morocco, and in preparation for that deployment she subsequently put to sea on numerous occasions for post-overhaul trials. She departed Toulon on 27 July 1942 and, after a stop at Oran from 29 July to 3 August 1942, arrived at Casablanca on 5 August 1942. During August and September 1942, she took part in numerous exercises for crew training.

In mid-September 1942, Archimède received orders to deploy to Saigon in French Indochina to relieve her sister ship Pégase there. In preparation for her deployment to Southeast Asia, she underwent a minor refit from 3 to 13 October and post-refit trials from 15 to 25 October 1942. On 26 October, she departed Casablanca bound for Dakar on the first leg of her voyage to Saigon. As of 1 November 1942, while she was at sea, she was assigned to the 3rd Submarine Division. She arrived at Dakar on 2 November 1942.

Archimède was at Dakar when Allied forces landed in French North Africa in Operation Torch on 8 November 1942. While the landings took place to the north in Algeria and French Morocco, Archimède patrolled off Dakar to protect the harbor from invasion.

==== Free French Naval Forces ====
After brief hostilities between Allied and Vichy French forces in French North Africa during the Torch landings, the surviving French fleet based in North Africa, including Archimède, joined the Free French Naval Forces, making her previously planned deployment to Japanese-occupied French Indochina impossible. She took part in numerous exercises between 1 December 1942 and 22 January 1943.

Archimède was among French submarines then sent to the United States for overhaul and modernization. She departed Dakar on 8 or 9 February 1943, according to different sources, and proceeded to Philadelphia, Pennsylvania, where she arrived on 24 February 1943. Work on her began at the Philadelphia Navy Yard at League Island in May 1943. The lack of a detailed plan of the Redoutable class and their parts hampered the shipyard′s work, and American engineers expressed frustration at the lack of standardization among the four Redoutable-class submarines at Philadelphia; For example, two had Schneider diesel engines and two had Sulzer diesels. However, they also noted that the Redoutable-class remained quite modern despite their 20-year-old design.

At Philadelphia, Archimède′s diesel engines underwent a full overhaul, her batteries were replaced, her hull was thickened and her diving planes reinforced to increase her test depth, and some of her ballast tanks were transformed into fuel tanks to increase her range. A significant effort went into improving her soundproofing, and radars, more efficient listening gear, a sonar, a new pitometer log, a new bathythermograph, air conditioning, and a refrigerator were installed aboard her. Her conning tower was modified, with the removal of a significant part of the navigation shelter and its replacement by a new gun mount for an Oerlikon 20mm anti-aircraft gun.

After the Philadelphia Navy Yard completed Archimède′s overhaul, she moved to New London, Connecticut. She departed New London on 19 February 1944 to return to war service in the Mediterranean Sea, and after a stop at Dakar she arrived at Casablanca on 7 March 1944. After pausing at Oran for repairs, she got back underway, bound for Algiers escorted by the Free French Flower-class corvette Commandant Détroyat.

On 18 April 1944, Archimède set out from Algiers for a special mission along the Mediterranean coast of Spain. On the night of 21–22 April, she landed six agents and picked up three others on the Spanish coast in Catalonia near Barcelona. She returned to Algiers on 22 April 1944.

On 11 May 1944, Archimède once again got underway from Algiers, this time to conduct a war patrol off France's Mediterranean coast. On 12 May 1944, three British aircraft mistook her for a German U-boat and attacked her, but she avoided damage by diving to a depth of 40 metres (131 ft). Her patrol otherwise was uneventful, and she returned to Algiers on 28 May 1944.

Archimède again set course for the Spanish coast on 31 May 1944, this time boarding two agents near Barcelona. She returned to Algiers on 4 June 1944.

Archimède departed Algiers on 3 July 1944, made a stopover at La Maddalena on Sardinia, then got back underway on 7 July for a war patrol off Toulon and Cannes. On the night of 13–14 July 1944, a German Wassermann radar at Cape Dramont in Southern France detected her and three German antisubmarine launches intercepted her and depth-charged her for three hours. On 16 July 1944 she sighted a small German convoy of four ships near Cap Camarat and fired four torpedoes at one of them – a German sloop-of-war — at 02:58, but the German vessel's draft was too shallow for the torpedoes to hit her. Archimède returned to Algiers on 20 July 1944 and began repairs.

Allied submarines were withdrawn from the French Mediterranean coast on 10 August 1944 in anticipation of the Allied invasion of Southern France, Operation Dragoon, which took place on 15 August 1944. With the naval war in the Mediterranean over, Archimède spent the rest of World War II awaiting a transfer to the Pacific Ocean to participate in the war with Japan. Between 15 and 22 September 1944 she made a number of post-repair test outings from Algiers, then moved to Oran. On 15 October 1944, she arrived at Toulon. She departed Toulon on 23 December 1944 to head back to Oran, which she reached on 25 December 1944.

From the beginning of 1945, Archimède took part in the training of surface forces, making about 30 sorties from Oran in the ensuing months. She departed Oran for Casablanca on 30 April 1945. On 8 May 1945 – the day Germany surrendered —— she departed Casablanca and, after calling at Dakar from 13 to 17 May, proceeded to the sound school at Freetown in Sierra Leone, where she arrived on 19 May 1945. At Freetown, she participated in numerous listening gear exercises before departing for Oran on 4 June 1945, conducting additional listening gear exercises en route. Upon arriving at Oran, she was drydocked for inspection of her ballast tanks.

Archimède spent the summer of 1945 making courtesy visits to French ports in the Mediterranean. The surrender of Japan on 2 September 1945 brought World War II to an end before she could deploy to the Pacific. Along with Argo, Casabianca, Le Centaure, and Le Glorieux, she was one of only five out of the 31 Redoutable-class submarines to survive the war.

=== Post-World War II ===
Archimède remained in French North Africa until the end of November 1945, conducting patrols and exercises. She departed North Africa for Cherbourg in late December 1945.

Archimède and her sister ship Le Glorieux began a major refit at Cherbourg in January 1946. They emerged from the shipyard in November 1946 with a test depth of 120 metres (394 ft), an increase of 40 metres (131 ft) over their original design, thanks to modifications made both at Philadelphia in 1943–1944 and at Cherbourg in 1946. After completing post-refit sea trials at the beginning of 1947, they were based at Brest in January 1947. From May to July 1947 they made an endurance cruise in African waters in company with U-2518, a German Type XXI submarine transferred to the French Navy after World War II to allow France to assess the Type XXI's revolutionary capabilities. They returned to Brest on 30 July 1947.

Operating from Brest, Archimède and Le Glorieux carried out extensive training and participated in numerous exercises during 1948. In early 1949 they arrived at Toulon, where they joined the Anti-Submarine Action Group (GAASM). During the first six months of 1949 they took part in many exercises and visited many African ports, cruising as far as French Guinea.

In mid-July 1949, Archimède returned to Toulon, where she was placed in "special reserve" on 31 August 1949. She was decommissioned on 19 February 1952.
