= French submarine Le Conquérant (Q171) =

French Navy Redoutable-class submarine of the M6 series commissioned in 1936

Le Conquérant
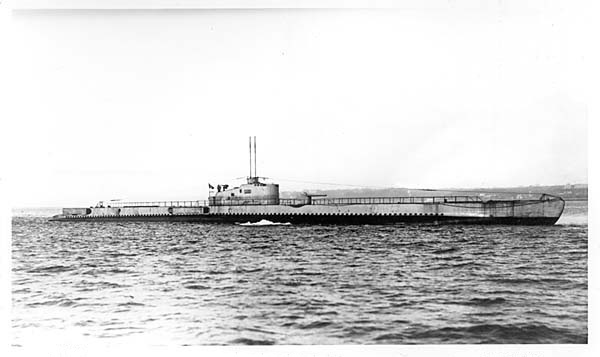
- Le Conquérant's sister ship Ajax in 1930

History

France
- Name: Le Conquérant
- Namesake: Conqueror, a person who engages in conquest
- Operator: French Navy
- Builder: Ateliers et Chantiers de Saint-Nazaire Penhoët, Saint-Nazaire, France
- Laid down: 16 August 1930
- Launched: 26 June 1934
- Commissioned: 7 September 1936
- Home port: Brest, France
- Fate: Sunk 13 November 1942

General characteristics
- Class & type: Redoutable-class submarine
- Displacement: 1,572 tonnes (1,547 long tons) (surfaced); 2,092 tonnes (2,059 long tons) (submerged)
- Length: 92.3 m (302 ft 10 in)
- Beam: 8.1 m (26 ft 7 in)
- Draft: 4.4 m (14 ft 5 in) (surfaced)
- Propulsion: 2 × diesel engines, 6,000 hp (4,474 kW); 2 × electric motors, 2,250 hp (1,678 kW)
- Speed: 17.5 kn (32.4 km/h; 20.1 mph) (surfaced); 10 kn (19 km/h; 12 mph) (submerged)
- Range: 14,000 nmi (26,000 km; 16,000 mi) at 7 kn (13 km/h; 8.1 mph) (surfaced); 10,000 nmi (19,000 km; 12,000 mi) at 10 kn (19 km/h; 12 mph) (surfaced); 4,000 nmi (7,400 km; 4,600 mi) at 17 kn (31 km/h; 20 mph) (surfaced); 90 nmi (170 km; 100 mi) at 7 kn (13 km/h; 8.1 mph) (submerged)
- Test depth: 80 m (262 ft)
- Complement: 5 officers (6 in operations); 66 men
- Armament: 11 torpedo tubes; 1 × 100 mm (3.9 in) gun; 1 × 13.2 mm (0.5 in) machine gun

Le Conquérant was a French Navy Redoutable-class submarine of the M6 series commissioned in 1936. She participated in World War II, first on the side of the Allies from 1939 to June 1940, then in the navy of Vichy France. She was sunk in November 1942.

== Characteristics ==
Profile of Casabianca, sister ship of Le Conquérant

Le Conquérant was part of a fairly homogeneous series of 31 deep-sea patrol submarines also called "1,500-tonners" because of their displacement. All entered service between 1931 and 1939.

The Redoutable-class submarines were 92.3 metres (302 ft 10 in) long and 8.1 metres (26 ft 7 in) in beam and had a draft of 4.4 metres (14 ft 5 in). They could dive to a depth of 80 metres (262 ft). They displaced 1,572 tonnes (1,547 long tons) on the surface and 2,082 tonnes (2,049 long tons) underwater. Propelled on the surface by two diesel engines producing a combined 6,000 horsepower (4,474 kW), they had a maximum speed of 18.6 knots (34.4 km/h; 21.4 mph). When submerged, their two electric motors produced a combined 2,250 horsepower (1,678 kW) and allowed them to reach 10 knots (19 km/h; 12 mph). Also called "deep-cruising submarines", their range on the surface was 10,000 nautical miles (19,000 km; 12,000 mi) at 10 knots (19 km/h; 12 mph). Underwater, they could travel 100 nautical miles (190 km; 120 mi) at 5 knots (9.3 km/h; 5.8 mph).

== Construction and commissioning ==
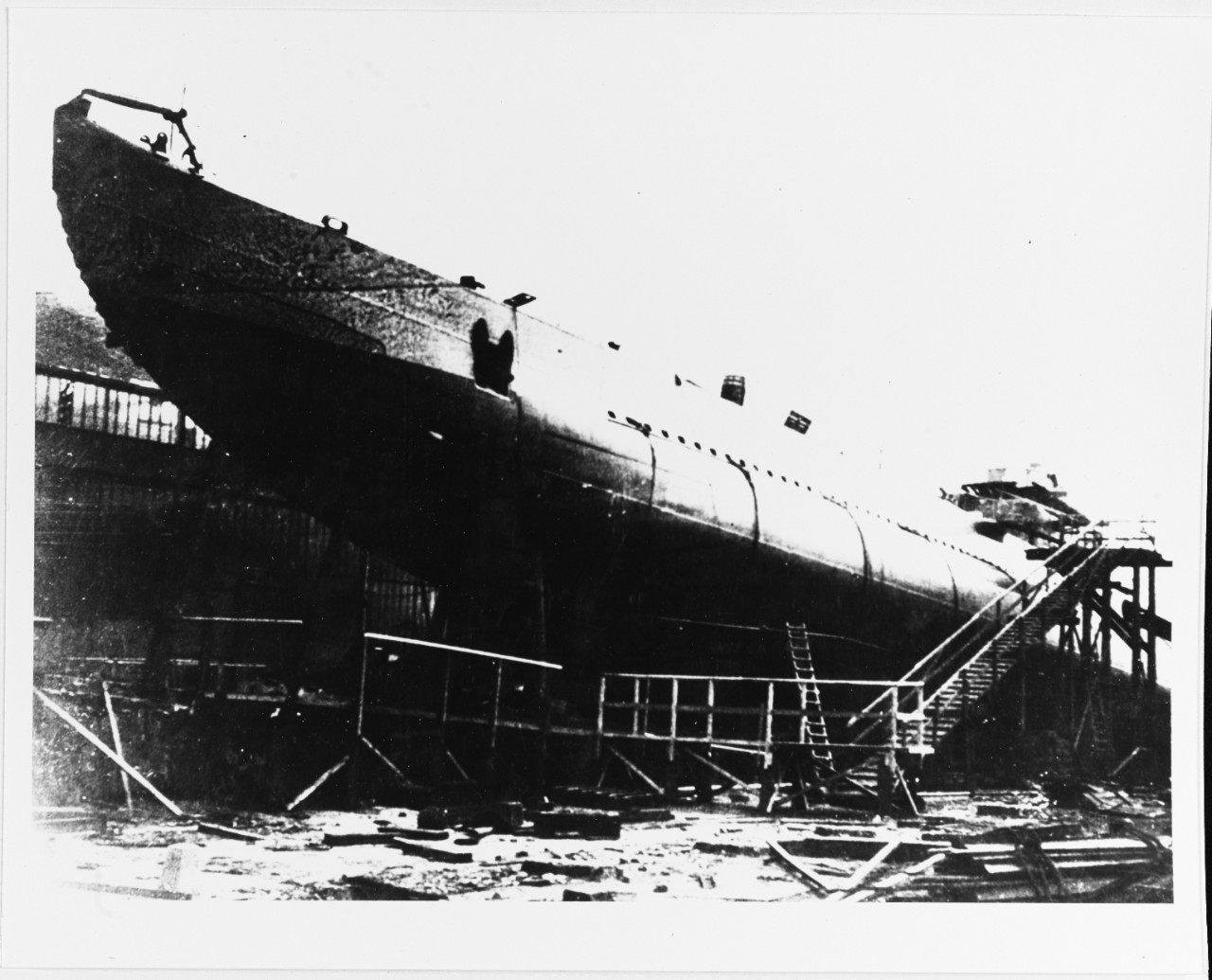
Le Conquérant under construction.

Laid down at Ateliers et Chantiers de Saint-Nazaire Penhoët in Saint-Nazaire, France, on 16 August 1930 with the hull number Q171, Le Conquérant was launched on 26 June 1934. She was commissioned on 7 September 1936.

== Service history ==
=== 1936–1939 ===
On 1 May 1938, Le Conquérant departed Toulon for a deployment to French Indochina in Southeast Asia. She was based in French Indochina from May to October 1938 with her sister ship Le Tonnant, then returned to Toulon, where both submarines arrived on 15 December 1938.

=== World War II ===
==== French Navy ====
At the start of World War II in September 1939, Le Conquérant was assigned to the 1st Submarine Division of the 3rd Submarine Squadron of the 1st Flotilla of the 2nd Squadron based at Toulon. Her sister ships Le Glorieux, Le Héros, and Le Tonnant made up the rest of the division. She was undergoing a major overhaul when the war broke out.

German ground forces advanced into France on 10 May 1940, beginning the Battle of France, and Italy declared war on France on 10 June 1940 and joined the invasion. Le Conquérant′s overhaul was completed in June 1940, and from 20 June she patrolled off Les Salins d'Hyères to protect Toulon. The Battle of France ended in France's defeat and armistices with Germany on 22 June 1940 and with Italy on 24 June, both of which went into effect on 25 June 1940.

==== Vichy France ====
After France's surrender, Le Conquérant served in the naval forces of Vichy France. When the attack on Mers-el-Kébir — in which a British Royal Navy squadron attacked a French Navy squadron moored at the naval base at Mers El Kébir in Oran on the coast of Algeria — took place on 3 July 1940, she was a part of Group A at Toulon along with her sister ships Archimède and L'Espoir. The three submarines received orders that day to form a patrol line in the Mediterranean Sea to attack British ships and protect Oran, the line to be formed on the night of 6–7 July 1940 and to extend from north to south for a distance of 20 nautical miles (37 km; 23 mi) east of Alboran Island. Three of Le Conquérant′s sailors deserted before she left port. The submarines got underway from Toulon at 02:45 on 4 July 1940 bound for their patrol areas at 15 knots (28 km/h; 17 mph), but were recalled to Toulon on 5 July 1940. The three Le Conquérant sailors, who had attempted to reach Free French forces via Spanish Morocco, were arrested, convicted of desertion by the military court in Casablanca, French Morocco, and sentenced to a year in prison.

On 1 January 1942, Le Conquérant was part of the 4th Submarine Division along with Le Tonnant and the submarine Aurore. In September 1942, Le Conquérant, Le Tonnant, and their sister ship Sidi Ferruch were transferred from Dakar in Senegal to Casablanca. On 1 November 1942, Le Conquérant still was part of the 4th Submarine Division, but by then the only other submarine in the division was Le Tonnant.

On 6 November 1942, Le Conquérant entered drydock at Casablanca for a refit that was scheduled for completion in early December 1942. On 8 November 1942, however, Allied forces landed in French North Africa in Operation Torch and the Naval Battle of Casablanca began between United States Navy and Vichy French forces. At 06:15, the U.S. Navy aircraft carrier USS Ranger (CV-4) and escort aircraft carrier USS Suwannee (CVE-27) launched an airstrike against Casablanca, and SBD Dauntless dive bombers began attacking targets in the harbor at 07:10. Although Le Conquérant's attack periscope was not installed and she had no torpedoes aboard, leaving her unfit for combat, she was launched from drydock and cast off at 08:00. Moments later, a 16-inch (406 mm) shell fired by the U.S. Navy battleship USS Massachusetts (BB-59) sank the drydock.

Le Conquérant received orders to refuel in the outer roadstead. She spent the rest of the morning submerged off Casablanca. After she surfaced in the afternoon, American aircraft strafed her several times, damaging her search periscope — the only periscope she had on board — and wounding two members of her crew manning her machine guns. During the evening, she entered port at Casablanca and refueled from tankers moored there.

Ordered to make for either Dakar in Senegal or Port-Étienne in Mauritania, Le Conquérant got underway from Casablanca on 9 November 1942 at either 05:00 or in the evening, according to different sources. While she was at sea, the Allies and Vichy French forces in North Africa signed a ceasefire on 11 November 1942.

==== Loss ====
Le Conquérant was on the surface bound for Dakar off Cisneros in Río de Oro on 13 November 1942 when two PBY Catalina flying boats of U.S. Navy Patrol Squadron 92 (VP-92) sighted her. The aircraft circled and challenged her, but saw no one on deck and received no reply. They then attacked her with depth charges, blowing her conning tower off and sinking her immediately about 700 nautical miles (1,300 km; 810 mi) southwest of Casablanca with the loss of her entire crew of 57. A French source maintains that Le Conquérant had French tricolor markings on her conning tower which should have made her nationality clear to the circling PBYs.

As a result of a postwar examination of records to determine the identity of the PBYs' victim, the U.S. Navy proposed in 1948 that they had sunk Le Conquérant′s sister ship Sidi Ferruch. It eventually became clear, however, that Sidi Ferruch had been sunk off Fedhala Roads, French Morocco, on 11 November 1942.
