= Fedhala Roads =

Fedhala Roads was a location off the coast of Morocco which during World War II was used by Allied forces as a gathering point for their ships. It took its name from the port city of Fedhala, now Mohammedia. German U-boats prowled the area and sank Allied ships when the opportunity presented itself.
