= French submarine Le Héros =

World War II French submarine

Le Héros
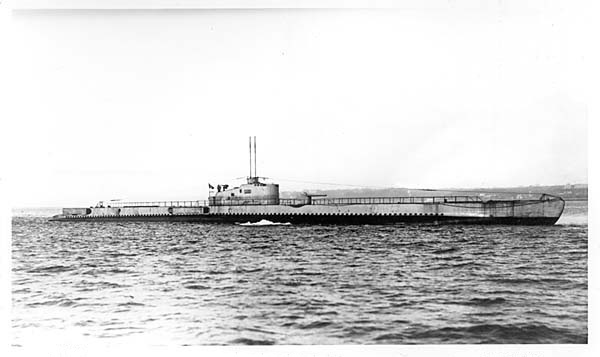
- Le Héros's sister ship Ajax in 1930

History

France
- Name: Le Héros
- Namesake: Hero, a person who faces danger or combats adversity with feats of ingenuity, courage, or strength.
- Operator: French Navy
- Builder: Arsenal de Brest, Brest, France
- Laid down: 1 August 1929
- Launched: 14 October 1932
- Commissioned: 12 September 1934
- Fate: Sunk 7 May 1942

General characteristics
- Class & type: Redoutable-class submarine
- Displacement: 1,572 tonnes (1,547 long tons) (surfaced); 2,092 tonnes (2,059 long tons) (submerged)
- Length: 92.3 m (302 ft 10 in)
- Beam: 8.1 m (26 ft 7 in)
- Draft: 4.4 m (14 ft 5 in) (surfaced)
- Propulsion: 2 × diesel engines, 6,000 hp (4,474 kW); 2 × electric motors, 2,250 hp (1,678 kW)
- Speed: 17.5 kn (32.4 km/h; 20.1 mph) (surfaced); 10 kn (19 km/h; 12 mph) (submerged)
- Range: 14,000 nmi (26,000 km; 16,000 mi) at 7 kn (13 km/h; 8.1 mph) (surfaced); 10,000 nmi (19,000 km; 12,000 mi) at 10 kn (19 km/h; 12 mph) (surfaced); 4,000 nmi (7,400 km; 4,600 mi) at 17 kn (31 km/h; 20 mph) (surfaced); 90 nmi (170 km; 100 mi) at 7 kn (13 km/h; 8.1 mph) (submerged)
- Test depth: 80 m (262 ft)
- Complement: 5 officers (6 in operations); 66 men
- Armament: 11 torpedo tubes; 1 × 100 mm (3.9 in) gun; 1 × 13.2 mm (0.5 in) machine gun

Le Héros was a French Navy Redoutable-class submarine of the M6 series commissioned in 1934. She participated in World War II on the side of the Allies until June 1940, and then in the naval forces of Vichy France, until she was sunk in 1942.

== Characteristics ==
Profile of Casabianca, sister ship of Le Héros.

Le Héros was part of a fairly homogeneous series of 31 deep-sea patrol submarines also called "1,500-tonners" because of their displacement. All entered service between 1931 and 1939.

The Redoutable-class submarines were 92.3 metres (302 ft 10 in) long and 8.1 metres (26 ft 7 in) in beam and had a draft of 4.4 metres (14 ft 5 in). They could dive to a depth of 80 metres (262 ft). They displaced 1,572 tonnes (1,547 long tons) on the surface and 2,082 tonnes (2,049 long tons) underwater. Propelled on the surface by two diesel engines producing a combined 6,000 horsepower (4,474 kW), they had a maximum speed of 18.6 knots (34.4 km/h; 21.4 mph). When submerged, their two electric motors produced a combined 2,250 horsepower (1,678 kW) and allowed them to reach 10 knots (19 km/h; 12 mph). Also called "deep-cruising submarines", their range on the surface was 10,000 nautical miles (19,000 km; 12,000 mi) at 10 knots (19 km/h; 12 mph). Underwater, they could travel 100 nautical miles (190 km; 120 mi) at 5 knots (9.3 km/h; 5.8 mph).

== Construction and commissioning ==
Le Héros was authorized under the 1929 naval program and was laid down along with her sister ship Le Centaure at Arsenal de Brest in Brest, France, on 1 August 1929 with the hull number Q170. Le Héros was launched on 14 October 1932. She completed fitting out for her sea trials on 15 October 1933, successfully finished her trials on 8 January 1934, and completed fitting out on 10 June 1934. Declared complete on 25 June 1934, she was commissioned on 12 September 1934.

== Service history ==
=== World War II ===
==== French Navy ====
When World War II began in September 1939, Le Héros was assigned to the 1st Submarine Division based at Toulon, France. Her sister ships Le Conquérant, Le Glorieux, and Le Tonnant made up the rest of the division.

In December 1939, Le Héros was sent in search of the German tanker Altmark in the mid-Atlantic Ocean with her sister ships Achéron, Agosta, Bévéziers, Fresnel, and Redoutable. From 8 to 29 March 1940, she carried out a patrol in the South Atlantic Ocean between Fernando de Noronha and the coast of Brazil, without success. In April 1940, the rest of the 1st Submarine Division was transferred to Bizerte in Tunisia, but Le Héros and Le Glorieux were based at Dakar in Senegal.

German ground forces advanced into France on 10 May 1940, beginning the Battle of France, and Italy declared war on France on 10 June 1940 and joined the invasion. The Battle of France ended in France's defeat and armistices with Germany on 22 June 1940 and with Italy on 24 June, both of which went into effect on 25 June 1940. Le Héros was still assigned to the 1st Submarine Division that day, home-ported at Toulon but apparently stationed at Dakar. (Note: Sources present a confusing picture of Le Héros′s whereabouts in late June and early July 1940. The French Wikipedia article fr:Le Héros (Q170) places her at Dakar from April 1940 (without a clear inline citation for the assertion) and mentions no move from Dakar to Toulon until after combat in Operation Catapult on 8 July 1940, citing Huan, pp. 89 and 117. U-boote.fr and Sous-Marins Français Disparus & Accidents do not mention her presence at Dakar in April 1940, and both assert that she was in the 1st Submarine Division at Toulon on 25 June 1940, departed Toulon with Le Tonnant on 1 July 1940, and departed Dakar for operations against British forces on 4 July 1940. The physical impossibility of Le Héros reaching Dakar from Toulon so quickly in July 1940 suggests that u-boote.fr and Sous-Marins Français Disparus & Accidents both confuse her division's home port (Toulon) with her physical location (Dakar) on 25 June and 1 July 1940, although it is not clear what her supposed departure from Toulon on 1 July 1940 refers to. Citing Huan, p. 117, the French Wikipedia article states that Le Héros and Le Glorieux moved from Dakar to Toulon in 1940 sometime after the 8 July 1940 combat at Dakar, then resumed active service in June 1941.)

==== Vichy France ====
After France's surrender, Le Héros served in the naval forces of Vichy France. apparently stationed initially at Dakar. After the attack on Mers-el-Kébir — in which a British Royal Navy squadron attacked a French Navy squadron moored at the naval base at Mers El Kébir in Oran on the coast of Algeria on 3 July 1940 — Le Héros and Le Glorieux got underway from Dakar at 04:30 on 4 July 1940 in company with a Latécoère 302 flying boat to retaliate by attacking the British heavy cruiser HMS Dorsetshire, which was patrolling south of Dakar. The flying boat found Dorsetshire and guided the submarines to her, but the submarines could get no closer to her than 6,000 metres (6,600 yd). They received orders at 16:00 to return to Dakar. During their return voyage, a seaplane from Dorsetshire attacked them, narrowly missing Le Glorieux with two bombs.

On 7 July 1940, a British naval force arrived off Dakar and, as a part of Operation Catapult, transmitted an ultimatum at 18:00. The French did not reply, and ordered Le Héros and Le Glorieux to put to sea. Many members of their crews initially refused to fight the British, but the commanding officer of Le Héros convinced them to participate in the sortie. The two submarines got underway to conduct the attack, but sources differ on the details of what followed. According to one account, they left Dakar together and anchored southeast of the island of Gorée at 21:30 on 7 July, then set off to attack the British squadron on 8 July 1940, a French sloop-of-war mistakenly opening fire on them as they departed, and submerged off Dakar at 11:20. In another version of the events, Le Héros was still moored in Dakar on 8 July and got underway at dawn that day, while Le Glorieux departed a few hours later; mistaken for a British submarine attempting to infiltrate the harbor, Le Glorieux suffered some light damage when she came under heavy gunfire from three French ships and was bombed by a French seaplane. In either event, both submarines spent the day submerged off Dakar and attempted to attack the British ships there but could not get close enough, and the British departed the area and headed for Freetown after Fleet Air Arm Fairey Swordfish torpedo bombers from the aircraft carrier HMS Hermes attacked and seriously damaged the French battleship Richelieu at Dakar that day. Both submarines returned to Dakar during the night of 8–9 July 1940.

By 8 August 1940, Le Héros and Le Glorieux were at Casablanca in French Morocco, From 5 to 7 November 1940, Le Héros and her sister ship Vengeur operated south of Cabo de Gata, Spain, to reconnoiter Gibraltar.

Le Héros and Le Glorieux later proceeded to Toulon, where they were placed under guard and maintained in a disarmed and unfueled status under the terms of the 1940 armistice. On 1 June 1941 they began training for a deployment to Dakar and from there to Madagascar in the Indian Ocean. They departed Toulon on 28 September 1941 and, after stops at Oran from 1 to 3 October and Casablanca from 5 to 7 October, arrived on 12 October 1941 at Dakar, where they both entered drydock from 15 to 19 October 1941 for hull cleaning.

In October 1941, the British boarded and captured a convoy of four Vichy French cargo ships en route to Dakar. To retaliate, the French ordered Le Glorieux and Le Héros to attack British trade routes along the coast of South Africa. The two submarines got underway from Dakar in company with a convoy on 27 October 1941 to continue their journey to Madagascar. (Note: Sous-Marins Français Disparus & Accidents enigmatically states "South, 3 November," without an explanation of what happened on that date. Possibilities for the reference to 3 November include an alternative date for their departure from Dakar or a date they detached from their convoy escort duties.) On either 15 or 16 November 1941, according to different sources, one of the submarines attacked the 4,000-gross register ton cargo ship Capo Olmo, some sources claiming that Le Glorieux fired two torpedoes at her south of the Cape of Good Hope off Port Elizabeth, South Africa, at 35°40′S 019°20′E and that both missed, others that Le Héros made the attack during a storm on 16 November 1940 and claimed to have sunk Capo Olmo. At 04:29 on 17 November 1941, Le Héros torpedoed the 5,750- or 5,757-gross register ton (according to different sources) cargo ship Thode Fagelund in the Indian Ocean off East London, South Africa, at 33°S 29°E. Thode Fagelund sank at 04:42, but her entire crew survived. Le Héros attempted an attack on another merchant ship during the evening of 17 November, but without success. Le Héros and Le Glorieux rendezvoused off Fort-Dauphin on the southern coast of Madagascar on 23 November 1941 and proceeded to Diego-Suarez, Madagascar, which they reached in poor condition on 27 November 1941 after a journey of 7,000 nautical miles (13,000 km; 8,060 mi).

On 8 February 1942, Le Héros departed Diego-Suarez to escort the auxiliary cruiser Bougainville, which was loaded with 1,200 tonnes (1,180 long tons; 1,320 short tons) of food, to resupply Djibouti in French Somaliland, which was under a British blockade. After arriving at Djibouti, Le Héros conducted a patrol in the Gulf of Tadjoura off French Somaliland from 27 February to 2 March 1942. She got underway from Djibouti on 17 March 1942 to return to Madagascar and arrived at Diego-Suarez on 27 March 1942.

On 2 May 1942, Le Héros departed Diego-Suarez to escort another cargo ship carrying supplies to Djibouti. Fearing a Japanese attack on Madagascar, which would compromise India's security and supplies, the British invaded Madagascar, beginning with amphibious landings in Courrier Bay near Diego-Suarez at dawn on 5 May 1942. In the Indian Ocean 500 nautical miles (926 km; 575 mi) north of Madagascar at the time, Le Héros accompanied the cargo ship she was escorting as it altered course to steer for the Comoro Islands. After seeing the ship safely to the Comoros, Le Héros made for Diego-Suarez on the surface at 17 knots (31 km/h; 20 mph). Throughout the afternoon of 5 May, she received more and more alarming reports from Madagascar about British progress in the invasion. She was still 250 nautical miles (463 km; 288 mi) from Diego-Suarez when a British aircraft forced her to dive at 15:00 on 6 May 1942. By the time she resurfaced at 15:30, the weather had deteriorated, forcing her to reduce speed to 12 knots (22 km/h; 14 mph). At 23:15 on 6 May 1942, she was 5 nautical miles (9.3 km; 5.8 mi) off Madagascar, near Cap d'Ambre (the northern tip of the island) and east-northeast of the Alizès Pass.

==== Loss ====
At 03:10 on 7 May 1942, Le Héros passed around the northern tip of Madagascar, heading for Courrier Bay on the northwestern coast to attack the British invasion fleet there. After skirting a French minefield, she reached a position off Courrier Bay at 04:30. At dawn, a flight of eight Fairey Swordfish torpedo bombers from the aircraft carrier HMS Illustrious surprised her on the surface either north or west of Courrier Bay, according to different sources, and attacked her with depth charges. She crash-dived, but a violent explosion shook her, knocking out her electrical power, rupturing her compressed air and diesel fuel systems, damaging her forward diving planes, and creating a leak which allowed seawater to enter her forward battery room, causing the release of poisonous chlorine gas. The exploding depth charges forced her to the surface, and her commanding officer ordered her crew to abandon ship. She sank 15 minutes after the attack, at 05:08, in 300 metres (984 ft) of water in the Indian Ocean at 12°03′45″S 049°03′30″E.

Le Héros′s entire crew of 72 men was left drifting in rough seas, and those without lifebelts quickly became exhausted and sank to their deaths. Sometime later, sharks began to attack the survivors. British ships reached the scene four hours after Le Héros sank, and the infantry landing ship HMS Keren rescued 52 survivors. One source claims that other survivors reached the coast of Madagascar on their own. Sources disagree on the number of men lost, claiming 19, 20, and 24 men missing.
