= French submarine L'Espoir =

1931 Redoutable-class submarine

L'Espoir
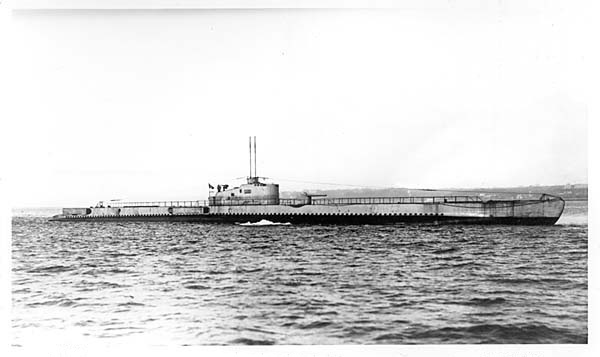
- L'Espoir′s sister ship Ajax in 1930.

History

France
- Name: L'Espoir
- Namesake: Hope, an optimistic state of mind based on an expectation of positive outcomes
- Operator: French Navy
- Builder: Arsenal de Cherbourg, Cherbourg, France
- Laid down: 1 August 1929
- Launched: 18 July 1931
- Commissioned: 1 February 1934
- Home port: Brest, France
- Fate: Scuttled 27 November 1942; Scrapped March–May 1943

General characteristics
- Class & type: Redoutable-class submarine
- Displacement: 1,572 tonnes (1,547 long tons) (surfaced); 2,092 tonnes (2,059 long tons) (submerged)
- Length: 92.3 m (302 ft 10 in)
- Beam: 8.1 m (26 ft 7 in)
- Draft: 4.4 m (14 ft 5 in) (surfaced)
- Propulsion: 2 × diesel engines, 6,000 hp (4,474 kW); 2 × electric motors, 2,250 hp (1,678 kW)
- Speed: 17.5 kn (32.4 km/h; 20.1 mph) (surfaced); 10 kn (19 km/h; 12 mph) (submerged)
- Range: 14,000 nmi (26,000 km; 16,000 mi) at 7 kn (13 km/h; 8.1 mph) (surfaced); 10,000 nmi (19,000 km; 12,000 mi) at 10 kn (19 km/h; 12 mph) (surfaced); 4,000 nmi (7,400 km; 4,600 mi) at 17 kn (31 km/h; 20 mph) (surfaced); 90 nmi (170 km; 100 mi) at 7 kn (13 km/h; 8.1 mph) (submerged)
- Test depth: 80 m (262 ft)
- Complement: 5 officers (6 in operations); 66 men
- Armament: 11 torpedo tubes; 1 × 100 mm (3.9 in) gun; 1 × 13.2 mm (0.5 in) machine gun

L'Espoir was a French Navy Redoutable-class submarine of the M6 series commissioned in 1934. She participated in World War II, first on the side of the Allies from 1939 to June 1940, then in the navy of Vichy France until she was scuttled at Toulon in November 1942.

== Characteristics ==
Profile of Casabianca, sister ship of L'Espoir.

L'Espoir was part of a fairly homogeneous series of 31 deep-sea patrol submarines also called "1,500-tonners" because of their displacement. All entered service between 1931 and 1939.

The Redoutable-class submarines were 92.3 metres (302 ft 10 in) long and 8.1 metres (26 ft 7 in) in beam and had a draft of 4.4 metres (14 ft 5 in). They could dive to a depth of 80 metres (262 ft). They displaced 1,572 tonnes (1,547 long tons) on the surface and 2,082 tonnes (2,049 long tons) underwater. Propelled on the surface by two diesel engines producing a combined 6,000 horsepower (4,474 kW), they had a maximum speed of 18.6 knots (34.4 km/h; 21.4 mph). When submerged, their two electric motors produced a combined 2,250 horsepower (1,678 kW) and allowed them to reach 10 knots (19 km/h; 12 mph). Also called “deep-cruising submarines”, their range on the surface was 10,000 nautical miles (19,000 km; 12,000 mi) at 10 knots (19 km/h; 12 mph). Underwater, they could travel 100 nautical miles (190 km; 120 mi) at 5 knots (9.3 km/h; 5.8 mph).

== Construction and commissioning ==
Laid down at Arsenal de Cherbourg in Cherbourg, France, on 1 August 1929 with the hull number Q167, L'Espoir was launched on 18 July 1931. She was commissioned on 1 February 1934.

== Service history ==
=== Pre-World War II ===
==== 1934–1938 ====
L'Espoir was underway bound for Toulon, France, on 13 July 1935 when two accidental explosions occurred on board. The explosions injured seven crewmen, three of whom later died of their injuries.

On 5 June 1937, the French Navy decided on a reorganization of forces and called for a cruise to test the endurance of French sailors and their equipment. Accordingly, L'Espoir and her sister ships Phénix, Le Conquérant, and Le Tonnant were designated as the submarines to conduct such a cruise, which would take them to the waters of Southeast Asia.

On 27 July 1938, L'Espoir was moored to a quay at Toulon when a fire broke out in one of her batteries. The fire killed one crewman.

==== Voyage to Southeast Asia ====
On 4 November 1938, L'Espoir got underway from Toulon in company with Phénix bound for French Indochina to reinforce French forces in Southeast Asia in the face of increasing tensions with Japan during the Second Sino-Japanese War. The destroyer La Railleuse escorted them as far as the island of La Galite in the Galite Islands off the northern coast of Tunisia, where the La Melpomène-class torpedo boat L'Iphigénie took over escort duty for them until they reached Malta. From there, the destroyer Épervier escorted them to Port Said, Egypt, where they anchored on 10 November 1938.

From Port Said, the submarines proceeded through the Suez Canal to the Red Sea, then called at Djibouti from 20 to 23 November 1938. After a stop at Aden, they headed across the Indian Ocean, interrupting their voyage with a visit to Colombo, Ceylon, from 2 to 8 December 1938. On 15 December 1938, the two submarines anchored for the night off Cap Saint-Jacques on the coast of Cochinchina, the southern portion of French Indochina. They got back underway on 16 December 1938 and made their way up the Saigon River to Saigon, which they reached at 10:00 (although the handwritten personal diary of a sailor from the aviso Rigault de Genouilly mentions the presence of the submarines at Saigon on 28 November 1938).

==== Operations in Southeast Asia ====
On 13 February 1939, L'Espoir and Phénix began a tour of Annam on the central coast of French Indochina. They stopped at Cam Ranh from 14 to 17 February, at Nha Trang from 17 to 20 February, at either Port Dayot or Cam Ranh from 21 to 23 February, and at Tourane from 24 to 27 February 1939. They returned to Saigon on 1 March 1939.

L'Espoir and Phénix departed Saigon on 14 March 1939 and took up their alert posts at Cam Ranh from 15 to 17 March. They returned to Saigon on 18 March 1939.

The two submarines got underway from Saigon again on 1 April 1939 and headed for the Gulf of Tonkin. They arrived at Haiphong on 5 April. During their stay there, Italy invaded Albania on 7 April 1939, and they received orders to prepare for possible combat operations against Italian forces. Departing Haiphong on 12 April, they made a cruise to Hạ Long Bay with a stop at Hòn Gai. They then conducted a reconnaissance of the anchorages at Île de la Surprise, Île des Merveilles, and the islet of Appowan. After calling at Haiphong from 17 to 19 April 1939, they headed back to Saigon, which they reached on 22 April 1939. Their crews then were granted shore leave at Da Lat.

On 13 June 1939, L'Espoir and Phénix departed Saigon to make a cruise to Hong Kong, where they were due to arrive on 20 June 1939, and then Manila in the Philippines, to pay a courtesy visit to British submariners at the former and American submariners at the latter. On the day of their departure, they took part in an exercise with the aviso Savorgnan de Brazza. At 12:00 on 14 June 1939, the submarines anchored at Cam Ranh, where they spent the night of 14–15 June 1939.

==== Loss of Phénix ====
At 08:57 on 15 June 1939, L'Espoir and Phénix got back underway to take part that morning in training maneuvers with the light cruiser Lamotte-Picquet and aircraft in the South China Sea off Cam Ranh northeast of Saigon, including a mock attack on Lamotte-Picquet by the two submarines. At 09:30, they exited Cam Rahn Bay, and at 09:37 they were headed due west at 12 knots (22 km/h; 14 mph). They altered course to 40 degrees at 09:50, then to 60 degrees at 10:00. Still on a course of 60 degrees, Phénix submerged for the mock attack at 10:26 when 6.6 nautical miles (12.2 km; 7.6 mi) bearing 76 degrees from Cam Ranh Point, and L'Espoir submerged at 10:27 on a course of 120 degrees. L'Espoir fired her exercise torpedoes at Lamotte-Picquet and surfaced an hour after submerging.

Phénix failed to surface after the exercise, and L'Espoir began to search for her. With concern for Phénix′s safety growing as the day wore on, L'Espoir transmitted a message at 12:18 to report Phénix missing. When the news reached the French Commander-in-Chief of the Naval Forces in the Far East, Squadron Vice-Admiral Jean Decoux, at 15:00, he ordered Lamotte-Picquet to get back underway and return to the area to join the search. Lamotte-Picquet reached the scene at 16:35, and she and L'Espoir searched until 17:06, finding only a slick of diesel oil which had appeared on the surface in the area in which Phénix had disappeared. L'Espoir returned to Cam Ranh at 18:30. The French had no submarine rescue capability in East Asia, and the only British ship in the area equipped to render rescue and salvage assistance to Phénix, the Royal Navy submarine depot ship HMS Medway, had departed Hong Kong and was at Weihaiwei, China, at the time, loading supplies for the relief of the blockaded British concession of Tientsin, too far away to reach the scene in time to attempt to rescue Phénix′s crew. Would-be rescuers estimated that the oxygen supply aboard Phénix hed been exhausted by the night of 15–16 June and that any of the five officers and 66 enlisted men aboard the submarine who initially had survived her sinking had suffocated.

The search resumed on 16 June 1939 under Decoux′s personal command. With Decoux aboard, L'Espoir put back to sea that morning and joined Lamotte-Picquet, the aviso Marne, and the survey ship Octant in the search. Strong currents interfered with the search, but during the morning, a Loire 130 flying boat of Escadrille 5 took advantage of favorable lighting conditions to spot Phénix′s wreck, which lay on the seabed in 105 metres (344 ft) of water. Salvage efforts ultimately failed, and came to an end on 5 July 1939. All five officers and 66 enlisted men aboard Phénix were lost.

=== World War II ===
==== French Navy ====
At the start of World War II in September 1939, L'Espoir was assigned to the 5th Submarine Division in the 1st Flotilla of the 2nd Squadron, based at Toulon. Her sister ships Monge and Pégase made up the rest of the division.

German ground forces advanced into France on 10 May 1940, beginning the Battle of France, and Italy declared war on France on 10 June 1940 and joined the invasion. During June 1940, L'Espoir joined the submarines of the 1st, 3rd, and 17th Submarine Divisions in patrolling in the Mediterranean Sea off Les Salins d'Hyères in defense of Toulon. The Battle of France ended in France's defeat and armistices with Germany on 22 June 1940 and with Italy on 24 June, both of which went into effect on 25 June 1940.

==== Vichy France ====
After France's surrender, L'Espoir served in the naval forces of Vichy France. When the attack on Mers-el-Kébir — in which a British Royal Navy squadron attacked a French Navy squadron moored at the naval base at Mers El Kébir near Oran on the coast of Algeria on 3 July 1940 — took place, she was a part of Group A at Toulon along with her sister ships Archimède and Le Conquérant. The three submarines received orders that day to form a patrol line during the night of 6–7 July 1940 to protect Oran and attack British ships, the line to extend from north to south in the Mediterranean Sea for a distance of 20 nautical miles (37 km; 23 mi) east of Alboran Island and south of Cape Palos. The submarines got underway from Toulon at 02:45 on 4 July 1940 bound for their patrol area at 15 knots (28 km/h; 17 mph), but were recalled to Toulon on 5 July 1940.

===== Voyage to Madagascar =====
In September 1940, the Vichy French Admiralty, with the concurrence of the Armistice Commission, decided to reinforce French naval forces in Southeast Asia by deploying four submarines to French Indochina. Two submarine divisions were formed for the deployment, the 8th at Toulon, consisting of L'Espoir and her sister ship Vengeur, and the 22nd at Bizerte in Tunisia, consisting of the Redoutable-class submarines Monge and Pégase. On 11 October 1940, L'Espoir and Vengeur departed Toulon bound for Oran in company with the tanker Lot, which was to accompany the four submarines on their journey to French Indochina. At Oran they rendezvoused with Monge and Pégase, and Lot and the four submarines were designated the "Lot Group" for purposes of the voyage. Monge′s commanding officer, who also served as commander of the 22nd Submarine Division, took on the additional responsibility of commanding the Lot Group as a whole. After a stay at Oran that lasted from 13 to 16 October, Lot and the four submarines passed through the Strait of Gibraltar under the escort of the destroyers Casque and Épée in a time of high tension with the United Kingdom and arrived at Casablanca in French Morocco on 18 October 1940 for a brief stopover. They then proceeded to Dakar in Senegal.

On 23 October 1940, the submarines got underway from Dakar to patrol off the Canary Islands. They encountered very heavy weather, and Pégase suffered damage to one of her diving planes. The submarines returned to Dakar on 28 October 1940. Subsequently, the submarines took turns conducting defensive patrols 10 to 35 nautical miles (19 to 65 km; 12 to 40 mi) off Dakar.

On 17 December 1940, Lot and the four submarines got underway from Dakar to continue the voyage to French Indochina, with their next stop at Madagascar. Bad weather helped to conceal them from detection by the British, and they rounded the Cape of Good Hope without incident. They encountered a tropical cyclone as they approached Madagascar, and anchored at Tamatave, Madagascar, on 15 January 1941. A second cyclone struck Tamatave on the day of their arrival, and Monge and Pégase in particular faced its more severe effects. Monge and Pégase got underway for Diego-Suarez in northern Madagascar on 16 January 1941. L'Espoir, Vengeur, and Lot departed Tamatave on 22 January 1941 to join them at Diego-Suarez. A lack of docking space at Diego-Suarez delayed their arrival, but the three vessels finally moored at Diego-Suarez on 2 February 1941.

The submarines' departure for French Indochina was delayed when the commanding officer of Monge, who also served as commander of the 22nd Submarine Division and of the Lot Group as a whole, became extremely intoxicated and began to show the early signs of a nervous breakdown. Although Lot, Monge, and Pégase departed Diego-Suarez on 16 February 1941 to begin the last leg of their voyage to French Indochina, the plans for L'Espoir and Vengeur to deploy to French Indochina were cancelled, and they remained behind in Madagascar. On 25 February 1941, L'Espoir′s propellers suffered serious damage when they struck a steel hawser. She was drydocked at Diego-Suarez from 3 to 20 March and again from 25 to 26 March 1941 for repairs and alignment of her propeller shafts.

===== Operations from Madagascar =====
After completion of her repairs, L'Espoir got underway from Diego-Suarez on 30 March 1941 to escort the French cargo ship Ville de Verdun, which was on a voyage to Dakar, as far as Tamatave, which Ville de Verdun reached on 31 March 1941. L'Espoir was at sea again from 1 to 15 April 1941 to cover the arrival at Madagascar of four French cargo ships from French West Africa, then returned to Diego-Suarez.

On 22 April 1941, L'Espoir departed Diego-Suarez to carry out a simulated raid against Tamatave during the night of 22–23 April. The mock raid was successful and prompted a reorganization of Tamatave′s port defenses.

L'Espoir next conducted an Indian Ocean cruise in which she called at Pointe des Galets on Réunion from 26 to 29 April 1941 before proceeding to Mauritius to reconnoiter Mauritius′s southern tip. While at sea, she received orders to come to the assistance of the French cargo ship Charles L. D., which had been captured between Réunion and Madagascar, but her efforts were unsuccessful. She then returned to Diego-Suarez.

From 6 May to 11 June 1941, L'Espoir was on alert at Diego-Suarez, required to maintain readiness to get underway on six hours' notice. During this time, she also put to sea for escort duty from 11 to 13 May 1941.

L'Espoir departed Diego-Suarez on 29 June 1941 for a lengthy voyage to escort the merchant ship Chenonceaux, which was bound for Dakar, but L'Espoir suffered serious damage to her starboard diesel engine on the first day of the voyage, forcing her to return to Diego-Suarez late in the afternoon. An inspection revealed that the engine had suffered a broken crankshaft, which could not be repaired in Madagascar.

Operating on only one diesel engine, L'Espoir left Diego-Suarez on 16 August 1941 for courtesy visits to ports along the coast of Madagascar and to the northwestern Comoro Islands. In Madagascar, she stopped at Majunga from 20 to 21 August and then at Hell-Ville before visiting the island of Nosy Be off Madagascar′s northwest coast from 24 to 31 August, putting to sea from Nosy Be on 27–28 August to conduct firefighting training. She then proceeded to the Comoros and called at Dzaoudzi on Mayotte from 2 to 3 September, Mutsamudu on Anjouan from 5 to 6 September, Fomboni from 7 to 8 September, and Dzaoudzi again from 11 to 13 September 1941. She returned to Diégo-Suarez on 14 September 1941.

L'Espoir served on coastal escort duties from 6 to 8 and 19 to 22 November 1941 but was unable to make supply voyages to Djibouti in French Somaliland — which other French submarines made while French Somaliland was under a British blockade — due to the poor condition of her batteries. On 2 December 1941, she set out from Diego-Suarez for an escort mission to Majunga, and on her return voyage called at Nosy Be from 4 to 8 December 1941 before arriving at Diego-Suarez on 10 December 1941. She began a minor refit at Diego-Suarez on 20 February 1942.

L'Espoir departed Madagascar on 16 March 1942, bound for France in company with Vengeur. The submarines made an overnight stop at Tulear, Madagascar, on 21–22 March 1942, where they met the French auxiliary cruiser Quercy. They next stopped at Dakar from 19 to 27 April, at Casablanca in French Morocco from 3 to 8 May, and at Oran from 10 to 11 May before arriving at Toulon on 13 May 1942, where they began repairs. They were disarmed and defueled at Toulon on 1 June 1942 in accordance with the terms of the 1940 armistice with Germany and Italy.

===== Loss =====
L'Espoir was still at Toulon when Germany and Italy occupied the Free Zone (French: Zone libre) of Vichy France on 27 November 1942, and she was among the French vessels scuttled at Toulon to prevent their seizure by Germany when German forces entered Toulon that day, sinking in the Northwest Basin at the Missiessy Docks. Her wreck was refloated and handed over to the Italians, who took her to La Spezia, Italy, where they scrapped her from March to May 1943.
