= French submarine Vengeur =

World War II French submarine

Vengeur
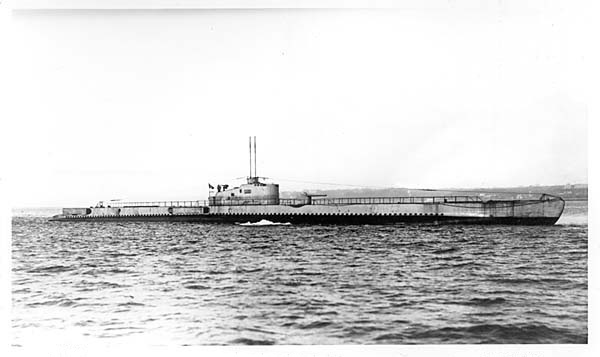
- Vengeur's sister ship Ajax in 1930

History

France
- Name: Vengeur
- Namesake: French for "Avenger"
- Operator: French Navy
- Builder: Arsenal de Cherbourg, Cherbourg, France
- Laid down: 11 January 1926
- Launched: 1 September 1928
- Commissioned: 18 December 1931
- Fate: Scuttled 27 November 1942; Scrapped March–May 1943

General characteristics
- Class & type: Redoutable-class submarine
- Displacement: 1,572 tonnes (1,547 long tons) (surfaced); 2,092 tonnes (2,059 long tons) (submerged)
- Length: 92.3 m (302 ft 10 in)
- Beam: 8.1 m (26 ft 7 in)
- Draft: 4.4 m (14 ft 5 in) (surfaced)
- Propulsion: 2 × diesel engines, 6,000 hp (4,474 kW); 2 × electric motors, 2,250 hp (1,678 kW)
- Speed: 17.5 kn (32.4 km/h; 20.1 mph) (surfaced); 10 kn (19 km/h; 12 mph) (submerged)
- Range: 14,000 nmi (26,000 km; 16,000 mi) at 7 kn (13 km/h; 8.1 mph) (surfaced); 10,000 nmi (19,000 km; 12,000 mi) at 10 kn (19 km/h; 12 mph) (surfaced); 4,000 nmi (7,400 km; 4,600 mi) at 17 kn (31 km/h; 20 mph) (surfaced); 90 nmi (170 km; 100 mi) at 7 kn (13 km/h; 8.1 mph) (submerged)
- Test depth: 80 m (262 ft)
- Complement: 5 officers (6 in operations); 66 men
- Armament: 11 torpedo tubes; 1 × 100 mm (3.9 in) gun; 1 × 13.2 mm (0.5 in) machine gun

Vengeur (Avenger) was a French Navy Redoutable-class submarine of the M5 series commissioned in 1931. She participated in World War II on the side of the Allies until June 1940, and then in the naval forces of Vichy France until she was scuttled in 1942.

== Characteristics ==
Profile of Casabianca, sister ship of Vengeur.

Vengeur was part of a fairly homogeneous series of 31 deep-sea patrol submarines also called "1,500-tonners" because of their displacement. All entered service between 1931 and 1939.

The Redoutable-class submarines were 92.3 metres (302 ft 10 in) long and 8.1 metres (26 ft 7 in) in beam and had a draft of 4.4 metres (14 ft 5 in). They could dive to a depth of 80 metres (262 ft). They displaced 1,572 tonnes (1,547 long tons) on the surface and 2,082 tonnes (2,049 long tons) underwater. Propelled on the surface by two diesel engines producing a combined 6,000 horsepower (4,474 kW), they had a maximum speed of 18.6 knots (34.4 km/h; 21.4 mph). When submerged, their two electric motors produced a combined 2,250 horsepower (1,678 kW) and allowed them to reach 10 knots (19 km/h; 12 mph). Also called "deep-cruising submarines", their range on the surface was 10,000 nautical miles (19,000 km; 12,000 mi) at 10 knots (19 km/h; 12 mph). Underwater, they could travel 100 nautical miles (190 km; 120 mi) at 5 knots (9.3 km/h; 5.8 mph).

== Construction ==
Constructed under the 1924 program as a submarine of the M5 series, Vengeur was laid down at Arsenal de Cherbourg in Cherbourg, France, on 11 January 1926 with the hull number Q137 and launched on 1 September 1928.

== Service history ==
=== 1931–1939 ===
At the end of her sea trials but before she was commissioned, Vengeur made a lengthy voyage accompanied by her sister ship Redoutable. Departing Cherbourg on 3 March 1930, the submarines made stops in French Morocco, Senegal, the West Indies, and the United States before returning to France in June 1930. They were the first French submarines to cross the Atlantic Ocean.

On 17 June 1931, Vengeur arrived in Brest, France, and she visited Brest again on 20 September 1931. She finally was commissioned on 18 December 1931.

In the Mediterranean Sea off Cap Sicié near Toulon, France, Vengeur took part on 23 April 1937 in the testing of a tracking device which made it easier to locate an airplane or airmen who had come down at sea by creating a fluorescent layer that airplane crews could see.

=== World War II ===
==== French Navy ====
When World War II began in September 1939, Vengeur was assigned to the 7th Submarine Division based at Cherbourg, attached to the maritime prefecture there. Redoutable made up the rest of the division. The submarines operated in the English Channel and North Sea.

German ground forces advanced into France on 10 May 1940, beginning the Battle of France, and Italy declared war on France on 10 June 1940 and joined the invasion. On the day Italy entered the war, Vengeur departed Bizerte, Tunisia, to patrol off the Cani Islands off Bizerte and protect the Tunisian coast from an Italian amphibious landing. From 13 to 21 June 1940 she patrolled off Palermo in Sicily, Salerno in Italy, and Cagliari in Sardinia. The Battle of France ended in France's defeat and armistices with Germany on 22 June 1940 and with Italy on 24 June, both of which went into effect on 25 June 1940.

==== Vichy France ====
After France's surrender, Vengeur served in the naval forces of Vichy France. She was assigned to the 7th Submarine Division and based at Toulon.

In September 1940, the Vichy French Admiralty, with the concurrence of the Armistice Commission, decided to reinforce French naval forces in Southeast Asia by deploying four submarines to French Indochina. Two submarine divisions were formed for the deployment, the 8th at Toulon, consisting of Vengeur and her sister ship L'Espoir, and the 22nd at Bizerte, consisting of the Redoutable-class submarines Monge and Pégase. On 11 October 1940, Vengeur and L'Espoir departed Toulon bound for Oran in Algeria in company with the tanker Lot, which was to accompany the four submarines on their journey to French Indochina. At Oran they rendezvoused with Monge and Pégase, and Lot and the four submarines were designated the "Lot Group" for purposes of the voyage. Monge′s commanding officer, who also served as commander of the 22nd Submarine Division, took on the additional responsibility of commanding the Lot Group as a whole. After a stay at Oran that lasted from 13 to 16 October, Lot and the four submarines passed through the Strait of Gibraltar under the escort of the destroyers Casque and Épée in a time of high tension with the United Kingdom and arrived at Casablanca in French Morocco on 18 October 1940 for a brief stopover. They then proceeded to Dakar in Senegal.

On 23 October 1940, the submarines got underway from Dakar to patrol off the Canary Islands. They encountered very heavy weather, and Pégase suffered damage to one of her diving planes. The submarines returned to Dakar on 28 October 1940. Subsequently, the submarines took turns conducting defensive patrols 10 to 35 nautical miles (19 to 65 km; 12 to 40 mi) off Dakar. From 5 to 7 November 1940, Vengeur and her sister ship Le Héros operated south of Cabo de Gata, Spain, to reconnoiter Gibraltar.

On 17 December 1940, Lot and the four submarines got underway from Dakar to continue the voyage to French Indochina, with their next stop at Madagascar. Bad weather helped to conceal them from detection by the British, and they rounded the Cape of Good Hope without incident. They encountered a tropical cyclone as they approached Madagascar, and anchored at Tamatave, Madagascar, on 15 January 1941. A second cyclone struck Tamatave on the day of their arrival, and Monge and Pégase in particular faced its more severe effects, but Vengeur also suffered damage. Monge and Pégase got underway for Diego-Suarez in northern Madagascar on 16 January 1941. L'Espoir, Vengeur and Lot departed Tamatave on 22 January 1941 to join them at Diego-Suarez. A lack of docking space at Diego-Suarez delayed their arrival, but the three vessels finally moored at Diego-Suarez on 2 February 1941, and Vengeur entered drydock there on 11 February 1941 for repairs.

The submarines' departure for French Indochina was delayed when the commanding officer of Monge, who also served as commander of the 22nd Submarine Division and of the Lot Group as a whole, became extremely intoxicated and began to show the early signs of a nervous breakdown. Although Lot, Monge, and Pégase departed Diego-Suarez on 16 February 1941 to begin the last leg of their voyage to French Indochina, the plans for L'Espoir and Vengeur to deploy to French Indochina were cancelled, and they remained behind in Madagascar.

After the completion of her repairs, Vengeur returned to an active operational status at Diego-Suarez on 3 March 1941. On 6–7 March 1941 she made a training outing in the waters off Diego-Suarez, and on 12 March 1941 she got underway to search for the French cargo ship Francois L.D., which was on a voyage from Dakar to Madagascar. She returned to Diego-Suarez on 19 March 1941 without having found the ship.

On 28 March 1941, Vengeur departed Diego-Suarez for a "representation" visit to Réunion. She arrived at Saint-Paul on 30 March 1941, becoming the first French Navy vessel to visit Réunion since the June 1940 armistice. She moved to Port des Galets on 31 March 1941 and remained there until 7 April, receiving over 1,000 visitors on board during her stay. She got back underway on 7 April and made a demonstration dive off Saint-Denis, then circled the island on the surface at low speed to show the French colors. She then departed Réunion's waters and made for Diego-Suarez, which she reached on 10 April 1941. She had covered 1,450 nautical miles (2,690 km; 1,670 mi) since leaving Diego-Suarez 13 days earlier. She began repairs at Diego-Suarez which lasted until the end of April 1941 and included a stint in drydock from 16 to 18 April.

Vengeur got underway from Diego-Suarez on 10 May 1941 to conduct an escort mission. She called at Tamatave from 12 to 14 May 1941 to rendezvous with the cargo ship Éridan, which she was ordered to escort as far as the parallel of Durban, South Africa — 30 degrees South, which the French defined as the operational limit of Madagascar-based submarines. In a Force 6 storm with heavy seas, Vengeur was forced to abandon the escort of Eridan on 18 May 1941, but she proceeded to the waters off the Cape of Good Hope in an effort to rendezvous with the cargo ship Compiègne — which was on a voyage from Dakar to Madagascar – and escort her the rest of the way to Madagascar. Unable to find Compiègne, Vengeur turned back for Madagascar, where she made stops at Fort-Dauphin from 23 to 27 May, Tulear from 29 to 30 May, and Majunga from 2 to 8 June before returning to Diego-Suarez on 10 June 1941. She was drydocked there on 11 June 1941 for hull repairs.

On 13 June 1941, negotiations between the Vichy French governor of French Somaliland and British authorities in the Aden Protectorate broke down, prompting the French Admiralty to order French naval forces in Madagascar to begin supply missions to Djibouti in French Somaliland, which the British were blockading. Vengeur received orders on 29 June 1941 to make the first voyage to Djibouti and achieve three results: create a submarine threat to British forces in the Djibouti-Obock-Aden area, deliver supplies to French Somaliland, and maintain the morale of people in French Somaliland. With 8.7 tonnes (8.6 long tons; 9.6 short tons) of supplies aboard,Vengeur set out from Diego-Suarez on 18 July 1941, heading north at 12 knots (22 km/h; 14 mph). After passing Cape Guardafui on the coast of British-occupied Italian Somaliland on 26–27 July 1941 and entering the Gulf of Aden, she operated submerged by day. On 28 July Vengeur sighted the Free French Naval Forces aviso Savorgnan de Brazza at the back of the Gulf of Tadjoura on the coast of French Somaliland and – under orders to attack Savorgnan de Brazza in retaliation for her sinking of her sister ship, the Vichy French aviso Bougainville, in the Battle of Gabon in 1940 —Vengeur fired a spread of four torpedoes at her at 10:11 at 11°51′N 043°08′E, but all four missed. Vengeur arrived at Djibouti at 13:00 on 28 July 1941 and moored alongside the tanker Élorn. During the afternoon, she unloaded her cargo and drove off a British reconnaissance aircraft with antiaircraft fire.

Vengeur began her return voyage during the evening of 28 July 1941. She passed Cape Guardafui on 31 July and reentered the Indian Ocean in heavy monsoon weather. The storm intensified, and she suffered significant damage, including five punctured ballast tanks. She reached Diego-Suarez on 8 August 1941, completing a 4,400-nautical-mile (8,149 km; 5,063 mi) round-trip voyage, and began repairs which lasted three months.

After completion of her repairs, Vengeur was placed on alert on 25 November 1941 for another Djibouti mission. She departed Diego-Suarez on 2 December 1941 bound for Djibouti with a cargo of 18 tonnes (18 long tons; 20 short tons) of food. She arrived at Djibouti on 11 December 1941. After discharging her cargo, Vengeur patrolled in the Gulf of Tadjoura on 15 December, and on 22 December 1941 she covered the sea trials of Élorn. Vengeur and her sister ship Le Glorieux sortied from Djibouti on 31 December 1941 and on 6, 13, and 16 January 1942 to protect barge convoys making the passage between Djibouti and Obock. From 16 to 20 January 1942, Vengeur, Le Glorieux, and the aviso D'Iberville conducted a patrol in the Gulf of Aden. Vengeur and D'Iberville then headed for Diego-Suarez, which they reached on 27 January 1942. Vengeur spent February 1942 in an alert status at Diego-Suarez.

Vengeur departed Madagascar on 16 March 1942, bound for France in company with L'Espoir. The submarines made an overnight stop at Tulear on 21–22 March 1942, where they met the French auxiliary cruiser Quercy. They next stopped at Dakar from 19 to 27 April, at Casablanca from 3 to 8 May, and at Oran from 10 to 11 May before arriving at Toulon on 13 May 1942, where they began repairs. They were disarmed, defueled, and placed under guard at Toulon on 1 June 1942 in accordance with the terms of the 1940 armistices with Germany and Italy.

==== Loss ====
Vengeur was at Toulon's Northeast Missiessy Basin when Germany and Italy occupied the Free Zone (French: Zone libre) of Vichy France on 27 November 1942, and she was among the French vessels scuttled at Toulon to prevent their seizure by Germany when German forces entered the naval base that day. Scrapping of her wreck began in March 1943 and was completed in May 1943.
