= French submarine Le Tonnant (Q172) =

1934 French Navy submarine

Le Tonnant
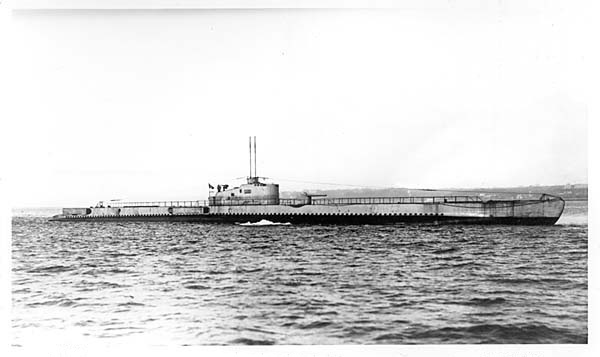
- Le Tonnant's sister ship Ajax in 1930

History

France
- Name: Le Tonnant
- Namesake: Thunderer
- Operator: French Navy
- Builder: Forges et Chantiers de la Méditerranée, La Seyne-sur-Mer, France
- Laid down: 10 January 1931
- Launched: 15 December 1934
- Commissioned: 1 June 1937
- Home port: Toulon, France
- Fate: Scuttled 15 November 1942

General characteristics
- Class & type: Redoutable-class submarine
- Displacement: 1,572 tonnes (1,547 long tons) (surfaced); 2,092 tonnes (2,059 long tons) (submerged)
- Length: 92.3 m (302 ft 10 in)
- Beam: 8.1 m (26 ft 7 in)
- Draft: 4.4 m (14 ft 5 in) (surfaced)
- Propulsion: 2 × diesel engines, 6,000 hp (4,474 kW); 2 × electric motors, 2,250 hp (1,678 kW)
- Speed: 17.5 kn (32.4 km/h; 20.1 mph) (surfaced); 10 kn (19 km/h; 12 mph) (submerged)
- Range: 14,000 nmi (26,000 km; 16,000 mi) at 7 kn (13 km/h; 8.1 mph) (surfaced); 10,000 nmi (19,000 km; 12,000 mi) at 10 kn (19 km/h; 12 mph) (surfaced); 4,000 nmi (7,400 km; 4,600 mi) at 17 kn (31 km/h; 20 mph) (surfaced); 90 nmi (170 km; 100 mi) at 7 kn (13 km/h; 8.1 mph) (submerged)
- Test depth: 80 m (262 ft)
- Complement: 5 officers (6 in operations); 66 men
- Armament: 11 torpedo tubes; 1 × 100 mm (3.9 in) gun; 1 × 13.2 mm (0.5 in) machine gun

Le Tonnant was a French Navy Redoutable-class submarine of the M6 series commissioned in 1937. She participated in World War II, first on the side of the Allies from 1939 to June 1940, then in the navy of Vichy France. She was scuttled in November 1942.

== Characteristics ==
Profile of Casabianca, sister ship of Le Tonnant.

Le Tonnant was part of a fairly homogeneous series of 31 deep-sea patrol submarines also called "1,500-tonners" because of their displacement. All entered service between 1931 and 1939.

The Redoutable-class submarines were 92.3 metres (302 ft 10 in) long and 8.1 metres (26 ft 7 in) in beam and had a draft of 4.4 metres (14 ft 5 in). They could dive to a depth of 80 metres (262 ft). They displaced 1,572 tonnes (1,547 long tons) on the surface and 2,082 tonnes (2,049 long tons) underwater. Propelled on the surface by two diesel engines producing a combined 6,000 horsepower (4,474 kW), they had a maximum speed of 18.6 knots (34.4 km/h; 21.4 mph). When submerged, their two electric motors produced a combined 2,250 horsepower (1,678 kW) and allowed them to reach 10 knots (19 km/h; 12 mph). Also called "deep-cruising submarines", their range on the surface was 10,000 nautical miles (19,000 km; 12,000 mi) at 10 knots (19 km/h; 12 mph). Underwater, they could travel 100 nautical miles (190 km; 120 mi) at 5 knots (9.3 km/h; 5.8 mph).

== Construction and commissioning ==
Laid down at Forges et Chantiers de la Méditerranée in La Seyne-sur-Mer, France, on 10 January 1931 with the hull number Q172, Le Tonnant was launched on 15 December 1934. She was commissioned on 1 June 1937.

== Service history ==
=== 1937–1939 ===
In 1937, the French Navy decided that Le Tonnant and her sister ship Le Conquérant would make an extended cruise to Southeast Asia to test the endurance of French submariners and their equipment. Prior to their departure, an incident occurred on board Le Tonnant while she was conducting diesel engine tests at La Seyne-sur-Mer in which two members of her crew plotted to seize control of her and deliver her to the Spanish Republican Navy for service in the Spanish Civil War. Their attempt to take control of Le Tonnant failed and the two ringleaders were imprisoned.

Le Tonnant made her endurance cruise to Southeast Asia in 1938, and from 1 April 1938 she was based in French Indochina, where Le Conquérant joined her in May 1938. Their stay in French Indochina ended in October 1938 and they returned to Toulon, France, which they both reached on 15 December 1938.

=== World War II ===
==== French Navy ====
At the start of World War II in September 1939, Le Tonnant was assigned to the 1st Submarine Division of the 3rd Submarine Squadron of the 1st Flotilla of the 2nd Squadron based at Toulon. Her sister ships Le Conquérant, Le Glorieux, and Le Héros made up the rest of the division. In December 1939 she deployed first to Oran in Algeria and then to Casablanca in French Morocco, from which she patrolled off the Canary Islands.

In February 1940, Le Tonnant deployed to Dakar in Senegal and then to Freetown in Sierra Leone. On 29 February 1940 she got underway from Freetown with Le Glorieux and the British Royal Navy destroyers HMS Dainty and HMS Diamond for antisubmarine warfare exercises, which took place northwest of Freetown on 1 March 1940.

In March 1940, Le Tonnant and Le Glorieux participated in a search for a disabled British cargo ship, SS Hartismere, which had suffered machinery damage. On 11 April 1940, Le Tonnant, Le Glorieux, and Le Conquérant took part in exercises off Dakar with the Royal Navy destroyer HMS Decoy. Later in April, Le Tonnant moved to Casablanca, then to Oran.

German ground forces advanced into France, beginning the Battle of France, on 10 May 1940, and that month Le Tonnant moved to Bizerte in Tunisia. Italy declared war on France on 10 June 1940 and joined the invasion, and that day Le Tonnant departed Bizerte to patrol off Cap Bon on the coast of Tunisia. From 20 June she patrolled off Les Salins d'Hyères to protect Toulon. On 24 June, she and her sister ships Fresnel and Pascal were sent to patrol south of Sardinia. The Battle of France ended in France's defeat and armistices with Germany on 22 June 1940 and with Italy on 24 June, both of which went into effect on 25 June 1940, interrupting their patrols off Sardinia.

==== Vichy France ====
After France's surrender, Le Tonnant served in the naval forces of Vichy France, initially in the 1st Submarine Division at Toulon with Le Conquérant, Le Héros, and Le Glorieux. On 17 August 1940, she was disarmed and defueled at Toulon in accordance with the terms of the 1940 armistice.

Le Tonnant was rearmed on 8 April 1941 and subsequently deployed to Casablanca in July 1941 and to Dakar in November 1941. By August or September 1942, according to different sources, she was operating from Casablanca along with Le Conquérant. As of 1 November 1942, she was part of the 4th Submarine Division at Casablanca with Le Conquérant, soon joined by their sister ship Sidi Ferruch. On 6 November 1942, she was floated out of drydock at Casablanca after a minor refit.

On 8 November 1942, Allied forces landed in French North Africa in Operation Torch and the Naval Battle of Casablanca began between United States Navy and Vichy French forces. At 06:15, the U.S. Navy aircraft carrier USS Ranger (CV-4) and escort aircraft carrier USS Suwannee (CVE-27) launched an airstrike against Casablanca, and SBD Dauntless dive bombers and TBF Avenger torpedo bombers armed with bombs began attacking targets in the harbor at 07:10. One of the first bombs to fall killed Le Tonnant′s commanding officer. Her executive officer took command, and at 07:30 she got underway under machine-gun fire, suffering two killed and 19 wounded. After she returned to port, she disembarked her dead and wounded and again put to sea with a partial crew — three officers and 32 enlisted men, seven of whom were wounded — to conduct dive trials, which revealed that seven of her ballast tanks and a hold had been punctured. She again returned to Casablanca for repairs and to disembark her seven wounded personnel.

After embarking 10 volunteers from other submarines — nine of them from the submarine Amphitrite — to flesh out her crew, Le Tonnant got underway at 18:35 on 8 November 1942 with only four torpedoes aboard in an attempt to reach Toulon or a neutral port or, if she failed in that, to scuttle herself to avoid capture. Heading north along the coast of French Morocco, she passed El Hank and Fedala between 9 and 10 November 1942. then headed back toward Casablanca. At 08:50 on 10 November, she detected a United States Navy task force north of Casablanca and launched all four of her torpedoes at Ranger, which avoided them. Ranger′s escorts counterattacked and subjected her to a depth-charging, but inflicted no damage on her. At 12:25, a U.S. Navy PBY Catalina bombed and damaged her.

Unable to return to Casablanca, Le Tonnant proceeded to Cádiz in neutral Spain, arriving there on 14 November 1942. Deciding that Le Tonnant could not make it to Toulon, her executive officer, still in command, decided to scuttle her. After disembarking 45 crew members at Cádiz, Le Tonnant got underway with a skeleton crew on board consisting of her executive officer and five others. After she reached the open sea, her executive officer opened her seacocks at 12:02 on 15 November 1942 and Le Tonnant sank. All six men on board abandoned ship, and a Spanish trawler rescued them.

== Discovery of wreckage ==
Le Tonnant's wreckage was discovered in the waters near Cádiz in December 2025. The discovery was made by a team of researchers and divers from the University of Western Brittany and the University of Cádiz, led by Erwan L'Her from the University of Western Brittany. After several unsuccessful exploratory dives searching for the wreckage, the team narrowed down the search zone by examining old naval logs. Using multibeam sonar to scan that region, the scientists discovered a wreck that was confirmed to be the submarine's.
