= French submarine Casabianca (1935) =

Casabianca
- Drawing

History

France
- Name: Casabianca
- Namesake: Luc-Julien-Joseph Casabianca
- Ordered: 1 June 1925
- Laid down: 7 March 1931
- Launched: 2 February 1935
- Commissioned: 1 January 1937
- Stricken: 12 February 1952
- Home port: Toulon
- Fate: Scrapped in 1956

General characteristics
- Class & type: Redoutable-class submarine
- Displacement: 1500 tonnes (surfaced); 2000 tonnes (submerged)
- Length: 92.30 m (302.8 ft)
- Propulsion: 2 diesels, of 4,300 hp; 2 electric engines of 1,200 hp
- Speed: 20 knots (37 km/h; 23 mph) (surfaced); 10 knots (submerged)
- Range: 14,000 nautical miles (26,000 km) at 7 knots (13 km/h; 8 mph), 10,000 nautical miles (20,000 km) at 10 knots (20 km/h; 10 mph); 4,000 nautical miles (7,000 km) at 17 knots (31 km/h; 20 mph); 90 nautical miles (170 km) at 7 knots (submerged)
- Test depth: 80 meters
- Complement: 5 officers (6 in operations); 79 men
- Armament: 11 torpedo tubes; 1 × 100 mm gun; 1 × 13.2 mm machine gun

Casabianca (Q183) was a Redoutable-class submarine of the French Navy. The class is also known as the "1500-ton class" and were termed in French de grande patrouille. She was named after Luc-Julien-Joseph Casabianca. Launched in 1935, she entered service in 1936. She escaped from Toulon during the scuttling of the fleet there on 27 November 1942, and continued in service with the Allied forces. Casabianca, commanded by Capitaine de frégate Jean L'Herminier, had a role in the liberation of Corsica, and was an important link between occupied France and the Free French government based in Algiers.

Casabianca was one of only five of the 31 Redoutable-class submarines to survive the Second World War. (Note: The others were Argo, Archimède, Le Centaure and Le Glorieux.)

== Service ==
It was initially planned to name the submarine Casablanca. Navy Minister François Piétri, who was Corsican, instead pressed for a navy vessel to be named in honour of Luc-Julien-Joseph Casabianca, a naval officer from Corsica who had served in the French Revolutionary Wars. The Casablanca was therefore renamed Casabianca prior to being launched.

In December 1939 Casabianca escorted Convoy HX 11.

Casabianca was in port at Toulon in November 1942 when the Germans enacted Case Anton, the annexation of the area of France previously controlled by the Vichy government. On 27 November 1942 German forces attempted to take over the fleet at Toulon, leading its commanders to order the ships to be scuttled to keep them out of German hands. Capitaine de corvette Jean L'Herminier, commander of Casabianca, instead took his submarine out to sea and escaped to Algiers to join the Allies. The submarine was attacked by German aircraft during the voyage, and was shadowed by a Royal Navy destroyer. Five other French submarines escaped from Toulon, two of which, Le Glorieux and Marsouin, served like Casabianca with the allies.

Casabianca in her original form, prior to modernization in the United States.

After arriving in Algiers, Casabianca passed under the orders of Admiral François Darlan, until his assassination on 24 December 1942. Casabianca was then under Général Henri Giraud, until Giraud's replacement by Charles de Gaulle. Casabianca's participation in operations around Corsica was one of the factors that led to Giraud's removal from office. She served mainly on intelligence gathering missions, supplying arms and delivering men to support the Corsican Maquisards. She played an important role in the eventual liberation of the island in September 1943. Her elusiveness earned her the nickname "Ghost Submarine" from the Germans.

The British conservative MP Keith Monin Stainton served as a liaison officer aboard the submarine in 1943, whilst a Royal Navy lieutenant. From 1943 until 1944 Charles William Beattie, a Royal Navy Signals specialist, also served on board Casabianca to safeguard and interpret secret cyphers sent to the boat whilst out on station. He took part in many of the secret landings on the Corsican coast.

In her last mission, Casabianca landed 109 special forces men, a record for a submarine of her size. The men were landed on an isolated beach at Arone, near the village of Piana, in the north west of Corsica, where a monument now exists.

After the liberation of Corsica, the Casabianca was used for regular patrols. In 1944 she was hit in a friendly fire accident by a British plane, and had to refit in Philadelphia until March 1945. In common with other Redoutable-class submarines modernized in the United States, the original conning tower was considerably modified. Two radars were installed, as was a platform on the front to carry a 20 mm anti-aircraft gun.

The submarine was scrapped in 1956, but the conning tower survives — it has been on display in Bastia near the harbour since 2004. The two periscopes and the deck gun are visible, however the conning tower was truncated from the rear, where a second 20mm gun was replaced by a 13.2 double machine gun of French origins.

During her career Casabianca sank one warship with a torpedo and another with her deck gun, sank a merchant vessel, carried out seven secret missions, assisted in the liberation of Corsica, and ran the German blockade of Toulon during her defection to the allies. Cited 7 times out of which 6 at the orders of the navy, Casabianca was decorated with the Croix de guerre 1939–1945 and was awarded the Red Fourragere of the Légion d'honneur.

== Namesakes ==
An anti-submarine escorteur was named Casabianca from 1957 until 1984. The Rubis-class nuclear submarine Casabianca is named after the Second World War submarine.

== Casabianca in popular culture ==
The submarine's exploits were used as the basis for the 1951 film Casabianca, starring Pierre Dudan and Jean Vilar. The Casabianca also appears in the 2007 novel The Double Agents by W. E. B. Griffin, book five of the Men at War series.
