= French submarine Achéron =

1929 Redoutable-class submarine in French Navy

Achéron
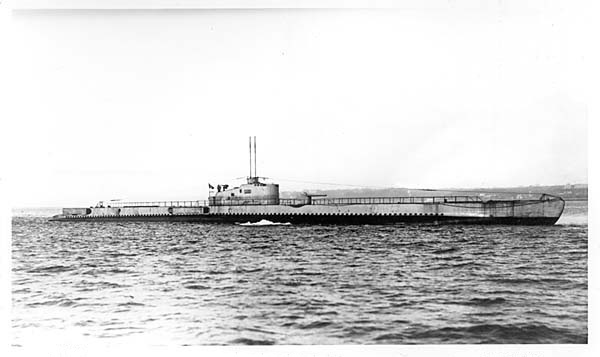
- Achéron's sister ship Ajax in 1930.

History

France
- Name: Achéron
- Namesake: The Acheron, a river in Greece, in Greek mythology leading to the entrance to the underworld
- Operator: French Navy
- Builder: Ateliers et Chantiers de la Loire, Saint-Nazaire, France
- Laid down: 4 or 24 September 1927
- Launched: 6 August 1929
- Commissioned: 22 February 1932
- Home port: Brest, France
- Fate: Scuttled 27 November 1942; Seized by Italy

Italy
- Acquired: On or after 27 November 1942
- Fate: Refloated 26 June 1943; Seized by Germany September 1943; Sunk 24 November 1943

General characteristics
- Class & type: Redoutable-class submarine
- Displacement: 1,572 tonnes (1,547 long tons) (surfaced); 2,092 tonnes (2,059 long tons) (submerged)
- Length: 92.3 m (302 ft 10 in)
- Beam: 8.1 m (26 ft 7 in)
- Draft: 4.4 m (14 ft 5 in) (surfaced)
- Propulsion: 2 × diesel engines, 6,000 hp (4,474 kW); 2 × electric motors, 2,250 hp (1,678 kW)
- Speed: 17.5 kn (32.4 km/h; 20.1 mph) (surfaced); 10 kn (19 km/h; 12 mph) (submerged)
- Range: 14,000 nmi (26,000 km; 16,000 mi) at 7 kn (13 km/h; 8.1 mph) (surfaced); 10,000 nmi (19,000 km; 12,000 mi) at 10 kn (19 km/h; 12 mph) (surfaced); 4,000 nmi (7,400 km; 4,600 mi) at 17 kn (31 km/h; 20 mph) (surfaced); 90 nmi (170 km; 100 mi) at 7 kn (13 km/h; 8.1 mph) (submerged)
- Test depth: 80 m (262 ft)
- Complement: 5 officers (6 in operations); 66 men
- Armament: 11 torpedo tubes; 1 × 100 mm (3.9 in) gun; 1 × 13.2 mm (0.5 in) machine gun

Achéron was a French Navy Redoutable-class submarine of the M6 series commissioned in 1932. She participated in World War II, first on the side of the Allies from 1939 to June 1940, then in the navy of Vichy France. She was scuttled in November 1942.

== Characteristics ==
Profile of Casabianca, sister ship of Achéron.

Achéron was part of a fairly homogeneous series of 31 deep-sea patrol submarines also called "1,500-tonners" because of their displacement. All entered service between 1931 and 1939.

The Redoutable-class submarines were 92.3 metres (302 ft 10 in) long and 8.1 metres (26 ft 7 in) in beam and had a draft of 4.4 metres (14 ft 5 in). They could dive to a depth of 80 metres (262 ft). They displaced 1,572 tonnes (1,547 long tons) on the surface and 2,082 tonnes (2,049 long tons) underwater. Propelled on the surface by two diesel engines producing a combined 6,000 horsepower (4,474 kW), they had a maximum speed of 18.6 knots (34.4 km/h; 21.4 mph). When submerged, their two electric motors produced a combined 2,250 horsepower (1,678 kW) and allowed them to reach 10 knots (19 km/h; 12 mph). Also called "deep-cruising submarines", their range on the surface was 10,000 nautical miles (19,000 km; 12,000 mi) at 10 knots (19 km/h; 12 mph). Underwater, they could travel 100 nautical miles (190 km; 120 mi) at 5 knots (9.3 km/h; 5.8 mph).

== Construction and commissioning ==
Laid down at Ateliers et Chantiers de la Loire in Saint-Nazaire, France, on 4 or 24 September 1927 with the hull number Q150, Achéron was launched on 6 August 1929. She was commissioned on 22 February 1932.

== Service history ==
In 1937, Achéron received orders to make a cruise to Argentina in company with her sister ships Agosta, Bévéziers, and Fresnel.

=== World War II ===
==== French Navy ====
At the start of World War II in September 1939, Achéron was assigned to the 3rd Submarine Division in the 2nd Squadron — a component of the 1st Flotilla — based at Toulon, France. Her sister ships Actéon, Fresnel, and Protée made up the rest of the division. In December 1939, Achéron joined Fresnel and their sister ships Le Héros and Redoutable in searching the central Atlantic Ocean for the German supply ship Altmark. Agosta and Béveziers, which were returning to France from the French West Indies, also joined in the search.

At the beginning of February 1940, the 3rd Submarine Division transferred briefly to Casablanca in French Morocco and on 6 February 1940 began patrols off the Canary Islands, where the Allies believed that German cargo ships had taken refuge at the beginning of the war and were serving as supply ships for German U-boats. During these patrols, Achéron opened fire with her deck gun on a 5,265-gross register ton steam cargo ship that her crew suspected of being a German blockade runner, forcing the ship to stop in the Atlantic Ocean at 34°25′N 018°08′W. Crewmen from Achéron boarded the ship and determined that she was the British merchant ship SS Somme, after which Achéron allowed her to proceed.

On 12 April 1940, the 3rd Submarine Division was transferred to the Mediterranean Sea, based first at Bizerte in Tunisia. While Fresnel remained at Bizerte, the division′s other submarines then transferred to Beirut in the French Mandate for Syria and Lebanon, from which they operated under the command of the British Commander-in-Chief, Mediterranean Fleet, Admiral Andrew Cunningham at Alexandria, Egypt. Achéron patrolled in the Eastern Mediterranean in the approaches to Beirut.

German ground forces advanced into France on 10 May 1940, beginning the Battle of France, and Italy declared war on France on 10 June 1940 and joined the invasion. On the day Italy entered the war, British submarines based at Beirut departed for operations in the Aegean Sea off the Dardanelles and in the Tobruk area off the coast of Libya, and on 11 June the French submarines L'Espadon, Phoque, and Protée also departed to operate in the Dodecanese, leaving only Achéron to defend the approaches to Beirut. On 16 June 1940, an Italian torpedo boat fired a torpedo at Achéron, but missed.

The Battle of France ended in France's defeat and armistices with Germany on 22 June 1940 and with Italy on 24 June, both of which went into effect on 25 June 1940. Achéron — by then assigned to the 3rd Submarine Division in the 3rd Squadron in the 1st Flotilla — was recalled to Beirut.

==== Vichy France ====
After France's surrender, Achéron served in the naval forces of Vichy France. Her batteries and those of her sister ship Actéon — which also was at Beirut — were in poor condition, but repairing or replacing them was impossible at Beirut. Escorted by the netlayer Le Gladiateur, the two submarines departed Beirut on 16 October 1940 bound for Toulon, which they reached on 24 October 1940. At Toulon, Achéron was placed under guard and maintained in a disarmed and unfueled state in accordance with the terms of the Armistice of 22 June 1940. By 1 November 1942, still in this status at Toulon, Achéron had been assigned to the 1st Submarine Group along with her sister ships L'Espoir, Le Glorieux, and Vengeur.

==== Loss ====
Achéron was at Toulon when Germany and Italy occupied the Free Zone (French: Zone libre) of Vichy France on 27 November 1942, and she was among the French vessels scuttled at Toulon to prevent their seizure by Germany when German forces entered the naval base that day, sinking in Dock No. 3 of the Vauban Grand Docks.

The Germans seized Achéron and handed her over to the Italians for scrapping. Her wreck lay in a position where her stern hindered the closing of Dock No. 3, so divers cut her stern. The Italians refloated her on 26 June 1943, but she was still at Toulon when Italy surrendered to the Allies on 9 September 1943. The Germans seized her and earmarked her for scrapping, but 88 American bombers dropped 240 short tons (210 long tons; 220 tonnes) of bombs on the Toulon Arsenal and sank her on 24 November 1943 before she could be scrapped.
