= French submarine Fresnel (Q143) =

1932 French naval submarine

Fresnel
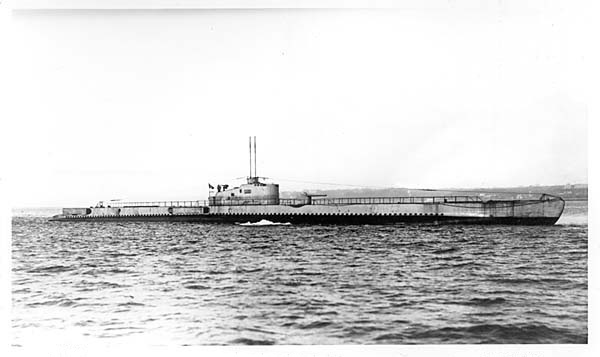
- Fresnel's sister ship Ajax in 1930.

History

France
- Name: Fresnel
- Namesake: Augustin-Jean Fresnel (1788–1827), French civil engineer and physicist
- Operator: French Navy
- Builder: Ateliers et Chantiers de Saint-Nazaire Penhoët, Saint-Nazaire, France
- Laid down: 7 July 1927
- Launched: 8 June 1929
- Commissioned: 22 February 1932
- Home port: Brest, France
- Fate: Scuttled 27 November 1942; Seized by Italy

Italy
- Acquired: On or after 27 November 1942
- Fate: Refloated 28 January 1943; Sunk 19 February 1944; Refloated 4 May 1943; Seized by Germany 9 September 1943

Nazi Germany
- Acquired: 9 September 1943
- Fate: Sunk 11 March 1944

General characteristics
- Class & type: Redoutable-class submarine
- Displacement: 1,572 tonnes (1,547 long tons) (surfaced); 2,092 tonnes (2,059 long tons) (submerged)
- Length: 92.3 m (302 ft 10 in)
- Beam: 8.1 m (26 ft 7 in)
- Draft: 4.4 m (14 ft 5 in) (surfaced)
- Propulsion: 2 × diesel engines, 6,000 hp (4,474 kW); 2 × electric motors, 2,250 hp (1,678 kW)
- Speed: 17.5 kn (32.4 km/h; 20.1 mph) (surfaced); 10 kn (19 km/h; 12 mph) (submerged)
- Range: 14,000 nmi (26,000 km; 16,000 mi) at 7 kn (13 km/h; 8.1 mph) (surfaced); 10,000 nmi (19,000 km; 12,000 mi) at 10 kn (19 km/h; 12 mph) (surfaced); 4,000 nmi (7,400 km; 4,600 mi) at 17 kn (31 km/h; 20 mph) (surfaced); 90 nmi (170 km; 100 mi) at 7 kn (13 km/h; 8.1 mph) (submerged)
- Test depth: 80 m (262 ft)
- Complement: 5 officers (6 in operations); 66 men
- Armament: 11 torpedo tubes; 1 × 100 mm (3.9 in) gun; 1 × 13.2 mm (0.5 in) machine gun

Fresnel was a French Navy Redoutable-class submarine of the M6 series commissioned in 1932. She participated in World War II, first on the side of the Allies from 1939 to June 1940, then in the navy of Vichy France until she was scuttled at Toulon in November 1942. She was never again seaworthy, but the Italians seized her and refloated her, and the Germans later took control of her. She was sunk in March 1944.

== Characteristics ==
Profile of Casabianca, sister ship of Fresnel.

Fresnel was part of a fairly homogeneous series of 31 deep-sea patrol submarines also called "1,500-tonners" because of their displacement. All entered service between 1931 and 1939.

The Redoutable-class submarines were 92.3 metres (302 ft 10 in) long and 8.1 metres (26 ft 7 in) in beam and had a draft of 4.4 metres (14 ft 5 in). They could dive to a depth of 80 metres (262 ft). They displaced 1,572 tonnes (1,547 long tons) on the surface and 2,082 tonnes (2,049 long tons) underwater. Propelled on the surface by two diesel engines producing a combined 6,000 horsepower (4,474 kW), they had a maximum speed of 18.6 knots (34.4 km/h; 21.4 mph). When submerged, their two electric motors produced a combined 2,250 horsepower (1,678 kW) and allowed them to reach 10 knots (19 km/h; 12 mph). Also called "deep-cruising submarines", their range on the surface was 10,000 nautical miles (19,000 km; 12,000 mi) at 10 knots (19 km/h; 12 mph). Underwater, they could travel 100 nautical miles (190 km; 120 mi) at 5 knots (9.3 km/h; 5.8 mph).

== Construction and commissioning ==
Fresnel was ordered under the 1925 program. Laid down at Ateliers et Chantiers de Saint-Nazaire Penhoët in Saint-Nazaire, France, on 7 July 1927 with the hull number Q143, Fresnel was launched on 8 June 1929. While fitting out, she suffered serious damage when, on 28 April 1930 during a test at Brest, France, in which her diesel engines were run in reverse, the control system for her stern diving planes broke, allowing them to move in a way that damaged both of her propellers and caused significant damage to her engines. After repairs and successful completion of her sea trials, she was commissioned on 22 February 1932.

== Service history ==
On 5 January 1933, a fire broke out aboard Fresnel while she was at Toulon, France.

In 1933 and 1934, Fresnel conducted a scientific cruise to collect gravimetric measurements in the northwestern Mediterranean Basin. During the cruise, a French hydrographic engineer made 30 gravimetric measurements.

On 5 June 1937, a reorganization of the French Navy's submarine force took place which also called for French submarines to conduct long cruises to test the endurance of their personnel and equipment. Orders called for Fresnel and her sister ships Achéron, Agosta, and Bévéziers to conduct such a cruise to Argentina.

=== World War II ===
==== French Navy ====
At the start of World War II in September 1939, Fresnel was assigned to the 3rd Submarine Division of the 3rd Submarine Squadron of the 1st Flotilla of the 2nd Squadron, based at Toulon. Her sister ships Achéron, Actéon, and Protée made up the rest of the division. She initially patrolled off the Canary Islands, where German merchant ships — which the Allies suspected of serving as supply ships for German U-boats — had taken refuge at the beginning of the war. During these patrols, her crew boarded the Portuguese ocean liner SS Nyassa and took prisoner eight Germans they found on board. In December 1939, Fresnel joined Achéron, Agosta, Bévéziers and their sister ships Le Héros and Redoutable in forming a patrol line to search the central Atlantic Ocean for the German supply ship Altmark, but Fresnel was low on fuel and soon had to proceed to Casablanca in French Morocco to refuel.

On 29 December 1939, Fresnel was patrolling in the Canary Islands when she stopped the British steam cargo ship SS Patriot by firing a warning shot, allowing Patriot to proceed after determining that she was not a German blockade runner. As of 6 February 1940, she and the other submarines of her division were based at Casablanca and still assigned to patrol in the Canary Islands, but Fresnel later was transferred to Bizerte in Tunisia.

German ground forces advanced into France on 10 May 1940, beginning the Battle of France, and Italy declared war on France on 10 June 1940 and joined the invasion. On 10 June 1940, Fresnel got underway from Bizerte, and she patrolled between Bizerte and Cape Serrat from 11 to 13 June 1940 to defend the coast of Tunisia against a possible Italian amphibious landing. On 24 June 1940, she was sent along with her sister ships Le Tonnant and Pascal to patrol in the Mediterranean Sea south of Sardinia. The Battle of France ended in France's defeat and armistices with Germany on 22 June 1940 and with Italy on 24 June, both of which went into effect on 25 June 1940. Fresnel was recalled from her patrol on 25 June.

==== Vichy France ====
After France's surrender, Fresnel served in the naval forces of Vichy France. She spent time at Toulon, then on 16 April 1941 departed Toulon in company with Actéon and their sister ship Henri Poincaré to transfer to Casablanca. Soon after arriving at Casablanca, Fresnel and Actéon got back underway on 22 April 1941 for a training cruise along the coast of French Morocco. They called at Safi on 23 April, at Agadir from 24 to 25 April, and at Mogador from 26 to 28 April before returning to Casablanca on 29 April 1941.

By 1 January 1942, Fresnel was assigned to the 5th Submarine Division at Casablanca along with Actéon, Henri Poincaré, and Pascal. On 25 September 1942, she began a stay at Fedala, French Morocco, which lasted until Actéon relieved her on 13 October 1942.

In November 1942, the submarines of the 5th Submarine Division received orders to proceed to Toulon to undergo a major overhaul, but Fresnel and Actéon were still in French North Africa at Oran in Algeria when Allied forces landed on the coast of North Africa in Operation Torch on 8 November 1942. As soon as the French detected the landings at Arzew, Algeria, Fresnel, Actéon, and the submarine Argonaute received orders at 02:50 on 8 November to get underway from Oran to oppose the landings. A British shell damaged Fresnel slightly just after she cast off, and she survived the detonation of five depth charges without further damage. At 10:45, as she prepared to fire a spread of five torpedoes at the British light cruiser HMS Jamaica, the premature launch of one of her torpedoes gave away her position. Jamaica sighted and evaded her torpedoes, and Fresnel subsequently survived three days of gunfire and depth-charging by counterattacking British warships, which pursued her all the way to the limits of Spanish territorial waters. After finally breaking contact with them on 11 November 1942, Fresnel found herself without further orders, so on her own initiative she headed for Toulon, which she reached on 13 November 1942.

Fresnel was in drydock in the Missiessy Docks at Toulon when Germany and Italy occupied the Free Zone (French: Zone libre) of Vichy France on 27 November 1942, and she was among the French vessels scuttled at Toulon to prevent their seizure by Germany when German forces entered Toulon that day.

==== Italy and Germany ====
The Germans seized Fresnel and handed her over to the Italians, who refloated her on either 28 or 29 January 1943, according to different sources, planning to refit her. She was sunk again on 19 February 1943, but the Italians refloated her again on 4 May 1943. The Germans seized her when Italy surrendered to the Allies and switched to the Allied side in accordance with the terms of the Armistice of Cassibile on 9 September 1943. Allied aircraft sank her for the final time on 11 March 1944.
