= French ship Persée =

At least two ships of the French Navy have been named Persée:

- French submarine Persée, a Redoutable-class submarine launched in 1931 and sunk in 1940.
- French minehunter Persée, an Éridan-class minehunter launched in 1988 and stricken in 2009.
