= French ship Pasteur =

At least three French ships have borne the name Pasteur:

- French submarine Pasteur, a Redoutable-class submarine commissioned in 1932 and scuttled in 1940
- SS Pasteur (1938), a passenger liner launched in 1938
- MS Pasteur, a passenger liner launched in 1966

== See also ==
- MV Pasteur
