= French submarine Ouessant =

Two submarines of the French Navy have borne the name Ouessant:

- French submarine Ouessant (Q180), a Redoutable-class submarine launched in 1936 and scuttled in 1940
- French submarine Ouessant (S623), an Agosta-class submarine launched in 1978 and sold to Malaysia in 2009
