= French submarine Agosta (Q178) =

WWII French submarine

Agosta
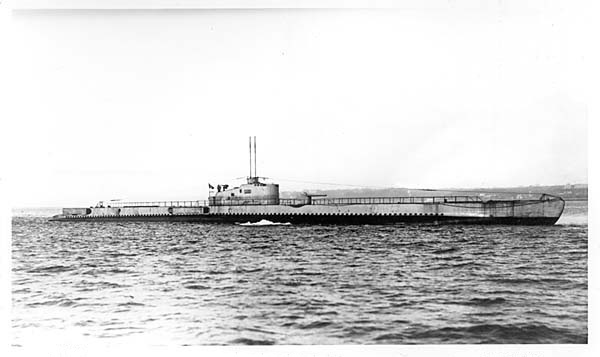
- Agosta's sister ship Ajax in 1930

History

France
- Name: Agosta
- Namesake: The Battle of Augusta of 22 April 1676
- Operator: French Navy
- Builder: Arsenal de Cherbourg, Cherbourg, France
- Laid down: 30 January 1932
- Launched: 30 March or 30 April 1934
- Commissioned: 1 February 1937
- Fate: Scuttled 18 June 1940

General characteristics
- Class & type: Redoutable-class submarine
- Displacement: 1,572 tonnes (1,547 long tons) (surfaced); 2,092 tonnes (2,059 long tons) (submerged)
- Length: 92.3 m (302 ft 10 in)
- Beam: 8.1 m (26 ft 7 in)
- Draft: 4.4 m (14 ft 5 in) (surfaced)
- Propulsion: 2 × diesel engines, 6,000 hp (4,474 kW); 2 × electric motors, 2,250 hp (1,678 kW)
- Speed: 17.5 kn (32.4 km/h; 20.1 mph) (surfaced); 10 kn (19 km/h; 12 mph) (submerged)
- Range: 14,000 nmi (26,000 km; 16,000 mi) at 7 kn (13 km/h; 8.1 mph) (surfaced); 10,000 nmi (19,000 km; 12,000 mi) at 10 kn (19 km/h; 12 mph) (surfaced); 4,000 nmi (7,400 km; 4,600 mi) at 17 kn (31 km/h; 20 mph) (surfaced); 90 nmi (170 km; 100 mi) at 7 kn (13 km/h; 8.1 mph) (submerged)
- Test depth: 80 m (262 ft)
- Complement: 5 officers (6 in operations); 66 men
- Armament: 11 torpedo tubes; 1 × 100 mm (3.9 in) gun; 1 × 13.2 mm (0.5 in) machine gun

Agosta was a French Navy Redoutable-class submarine of the M6 series commissioned in 1937. She participated in World War II on the side of the Allies until she was scuttled in 1940.

== Characteristics ==
Profile of Casabianca, sister ship of Agosta.

Agosta was part of a fairly homogeneous series of 31 deep-sea patrol submarines also called "1,500-tonners" because of their displacement. All entered service between 1931 and 1939.

The Redoutable-class submarines were 92.3 metres (302 ft 10 in) long and 8.1 metres (26 ft 7 in) in beam and had a draft of 4.4 metres (14 ft 5 in). They could dive to a depth of 80 metres (262 ft). They displaced 1,572 tonnes (1,547 long tons) on the surface and 2,082 tonnes (2,049 long tons) underwater. Propelled on the surface by two diesel engines producing a combined 6,000 horsepower (4,474 kW), they had a maximum speed of 18.6 knots (34.4 km/h; 21.4 mph). When submerged, their two electric motors produced a combined 2,250 horsepower (1,678 kW) and allowed them to reach 10 knots (19 km/h; 12 mph). Also called "deep-cruising submarines", their range on the surface was 10,000 nautical miles (19,000 km; 12,000 mi) at 10 knots (19 km/h; 12 mph). Underwater, they could travel 100 nautical miles (190 km; 120 mi) at 5 knots (9.3 km/h; 5.8 mph).

== Construction and commissioning ==
Laid down at Arsenal de Cherbourg in Cherbourg, France, on 2 February 1932 with the hull number Q178, Agosta was launched on either 30 March or 30 April 1934, according to different sources. She was commissioned on 1 February 1937.

== Service history ==
=== 1937–1939 ===
In 1937, Agosta and her sister ships Achéron, Bévéziers, and Fresnel received orders to make a cruise to Argentina to test the endurance of French submarine crews and their equipment. Based on the experiences of other French submarines, which had made similar cruises to places such as Douala in French Cameroon and French Indochina in Southeast Asia, an air refrigeration system was installed aboard Agosta and her sister ship Ouessant to test its capability to improve the habitability of French submarines in tropical climates. On 23 December 1937, Agosta arrived at Fort-de-France on Martinique in the French West Indies in company with Bévéziers during their Argentina cruise.

=== World War II ===
When World War II began with Germany's invasion of Poland on 1 September 1939, Agosta was assigned to the 8th Submarine Division in the 4th Submarine Squadron in the High Seas Force's 1st Squadron based at Brest, France. Her sister ships Bévéziers, Ouessant, and Sidi Ferruch made up the rest of the division. That day, Agosta, Ouessant, and their sister ships Achille and Casabianca got underway from Brest to investigate the waters around Vigo, Spain, and report on the presence of German ships and submarines there. France declared war on 3 September 1939, and on 4 September the mission was cancelled and the submarines returned to Brest.

On 14 September 1939, Agosta, Achille, Casabianca, Ouessant, and their sister ships Pasteur and Sfax received orders to establish a permanent patrol off Vigo, where German merchant ships — which the Allies suspected of serving as supply ships for German U-boats — had taken refuge upon the outbreak of war. They continued the patrols off Vigo until the end of October 1939.

Agosta and the rest of the 8th Submarine Division next left European waters and proceeded to Fort-de-France on Martinique in the French West Indies to conduct patrols in the vicinity of Trinidad the British had requested. Agosta patrolled primarily in the Columbus Channel, also known as the Serpent's Mouth, between Trinidad and Venezuela.

On 12 January 1940, Agosta departed Fort-de-France in company with Ouessant bound for Brest. After a stop at Casablanca in French Morocco, the two submarines arrived at Brest on 1 February 1940 and began a major overhaul.

Agosta was still undergoing overhaul when German ground forces advanced into France on 10 May 1940, beginning the Battle of France, and Italy declared war on France on 10 June 1940 and joined the invasion. As German ground forces approached Brest, Agosta, unable to get underway, was scuttled at 19:00 on 18 June 1940 to prevent her capture by the Germans. The Battle of France ended in France's defeat and armistices with Germany on 22 June 1940 and with Italy on 24 June, both of which went into effect on 25 June 1940.

The Germans refloated Agosta on 25 June 1941 to clear her berth and towed her to Bordeaux, France. She was salvaged in 1944.

=== Post-World War II ===
After her salvage, Agosta was hulked. From 1948 to 1951 she served as a wreck lifter along with Ouessant.
