= French submarine Persée =

Persée
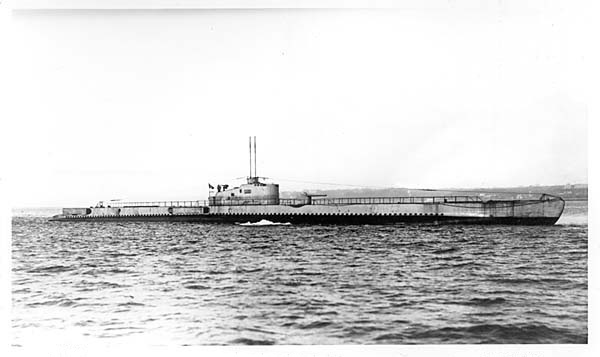
- The Ajax, another Redoubtable-class submarine

History

France
- Name: Persée
- Namesake: Perseus, the legendary founder of Mycenae and of the Perseid dynasty in Greek mythology
- Builder: Chantiers Navals Français Caen
- Laid down: 14 April 1929
- Launched: 23 May 1931
- Commissioned: 10 June 1934
- Identification: Q154
- Fate: Sunk 23 September 1940

General characteristics
- Class & type: Redoutable-class submarine
- Displacement: 1,572 tonnes (surfaced); 2,082 tonnes (submerged)
- Length: 92.30 m (302 ft 10 in)
- Beam: 8.10 m (26 ft 7 in)
- Propulsion: 2 × diesels, of 6,000 hp (4,500 kW); 2 × electric engines of 2,250 hp (1,680 kW)
- Speed: 17.5 knots (32.4 km/h; 20.1 mph) (surfaced); 10 knots (19 km/h; 12 mph) (submerged)
- Range: 14,000 nautical miles (26,000 km) at 7 knots (13 km/h; 8.1 mph), 10,000 nautical miles (20,000 km) at 10 knots (19 km/h; 12 mph); 4,000 nautical miles (7,000 km) at 17 knots (31 km/h; 20 mph); 90 nautical miles (170 km) at 7 knots (submerged)
- Test depth: 80 m (260 ft)
- Complement: 5 officers (6 in operations); 66 men
- Armament: 9 x 550 mm torpedo tubes; 2 x 400 mm torpedo tubes; 1 x 100 mm cannon; 1 x 13.2 mm/76 double-machine-gun

The Persée was a Redoutable-class (Note: Also known as the 1500-tonne class or "sous-marins de grandes croisières" (large cruiser submarines)) submarine in the navies of the French Third Republic and Vichy France. Belonging to the M6 series, it was launched in 1931. The vessel was damaged by an explosion while undergoing sea trials off the coast of France, killing two aboard and wounding several others. Based at Brest at the onset of the Second World War, Persée joined in the search for the German merchant fleet still at sea. The vessel joined the Vichy France Navy and transferred first to Casablanca then Dakar. Persée was attacked at Dakar where the submarine was torpedoed on the surface by a British ship. The vessel was set afire and sank, with the entirety of the crew rescued save one.

== Description ==
Persée was part of a semi-homogenous class of thirty-one submarines designed for oceangoing patrols and entering service between 1931 and 1939. 92.3 metres (302 ft 10 in) long and with a beam of 8.10 metres (26 ft 7 in) and a draught of 4.40 metres (14 ft 5 in), their maximum diving depth was 80 metres (260 ft). Their displacement was 1,572 tonnes on the surface and 2,082 tonnes submerged. Surface propulsion was provided by two diesel motors with a total of 6,000 horsepower (4,500 kW), giving a maximum surface speed of 18.6 knots (34.4 km/h; 21.4 mph), with electric propulsion of 2,250 hp (1,680 kW) giving a submerged speed of 10 knots (19 km/h; 12 mph). They had a surface range of 10,000 nautical miles (19,000 km; 12,000 mi) at 10 knots and a submerged range of 100 nmi (190 km; 120 mi) at 5 knots (9.3 km/h; 5.8 mph).

== History ==
=== Early career ===
Laid down on 14 April 1929 with the hull number Q154, the submarine was launched on 23 May 1931. On 26 September 1932, two months after the loss of the Prométhée, another incident killed six sailors and workers at the naval docks in Cherbourg. Commissioning under the command of lieutenant de vaisseau Bertrand, the Persée left for trials off pointe de Jardeheu, a few miles to the west of Cherbourg. The crankcases of the Schneider diesel motors leaked oil and then exploded, killing two men and wounding several others, including the vessel's second in command, lieutenant de vaisseau Jean L'Herminier, future commander of the Casabianca during the Second World War. The submarine was towed back to Cherbourg by the Simon-Duhamel II, a trawler operating from Fecamp, escorted by the submarine Surcouf, whose doctor treated the wounded. The Persée then entered service on 10 June 1934.

=== Second World War ===
At the start of the Second World War she, Ajax, Archimède and Poncelet formed the 6th submarine division, based at Brest. Persée and Poncelet patrolled off the Azores, whence part of the German merchant fleet had fled and from which they were suspected to be acting as supply ships for German U-boats. The pair of submarines returned to Cherbourg on 12 October.

During the German advance in spring the next year she left Cherbourg for Brest, departing the latter at 18:30 on 18 June in tandem with the supply ship Jules Verne, Ajax, Poncelet, Casabianca, Sfax and nine other submarines, arriving at Casablanca on 23 June. After the British attack on Mers-el-Kébir on 3 July, she and Ajax patrolled along the Moroccan coast.

From 19 July onwards Poncelet and Persée were instead based at Dakar. From 26 to 29 August Persée escorted the cable-laying ship Alsace, which had been sent to repair the cable between Casablanca and Dakar, which the British had cut off Cap Juby. On 23 September Dakar was attacked by British and Free French forces. HMS Inglefield torpedoed the Persée on the surface off Cap Manuel but failed to sink her. However, British destroyers continued to hunt her and - unable to dive due to shoals - she was seriously damaged and set on fire. Her whole crew except one quartermaster was then picked up by the aviso La Surprise.

== Bibliography ==
- Huan, Claude (2004). Les Sous-marins français 1918-1945 (in French). Rennes: Marines Éditions. p. 240. ISBN 978-2-915379-07-5. OCLC 55595422.
- Picard, Claude (2006). Les Sous-marins de 1 500 tonnes (in French). Rennes: Marines Editions. p. 119. ISBN 2-915379-55-6. OCLC 421731181.
