= French submarine Prométhée (1930) =

French submarine

Coordinates: 49°48′31.6″N 1°26′42.1″W

Prométhée
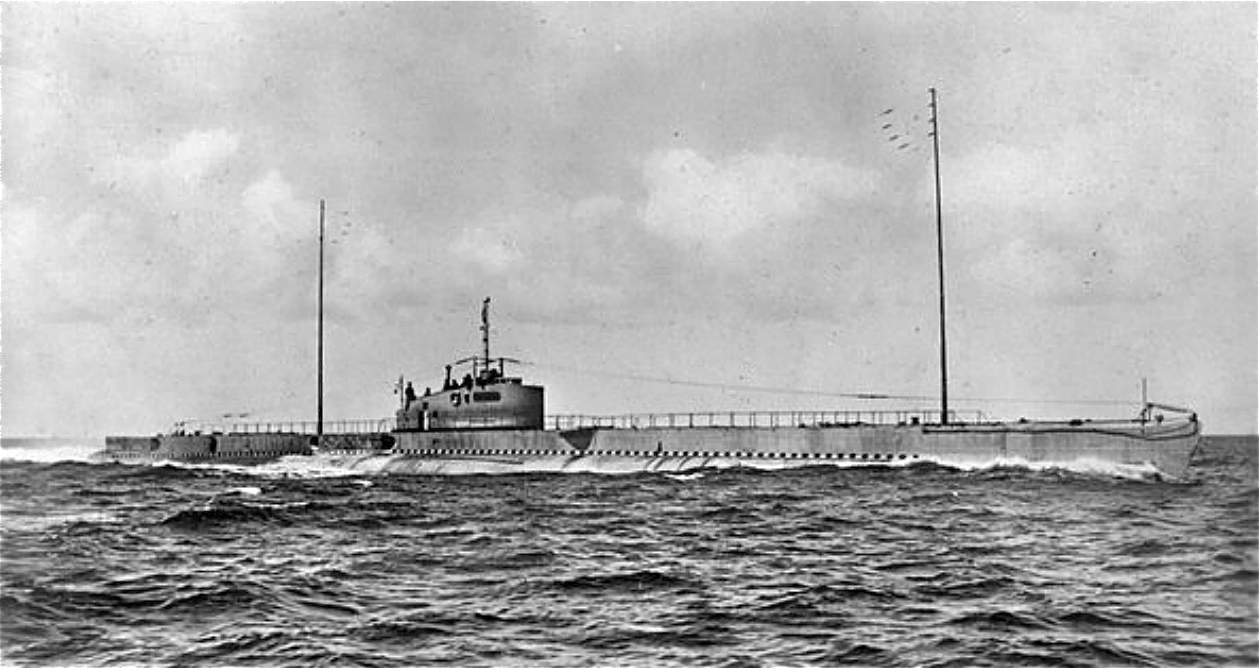
- Prométhée during trials. The 100 mm deck gun had not yet been installed.

History

France
- Name: Prométhée
- Namesake: Prometheus, a Titan god of fire in Greek mythology
- Builder: Arsenal de Cherbourg
- Laid down: 10 January 1928
- Launched: 23 October 1930
- Commissioned: Never commissioned
- Fate: Sunk on 7 July 1932

General characteristics
- Class & type: Redoutable-class submarine
- Displacement: 1,500 t (1,500 long tons) (surfaced); 2,000 t (2,000 long tons) (submerged)
- Length: 92.30 m (302 ft 10 in)
- Beam: 8.10 m (26 ft 7 in)
- Propulsion: 2 diesels, of 4,500 kW (6,000 hp); 2 electric engines of 1,680 kW (2,250 hp)
- Speed: 20 knots (37 km/h; 23 mph) (surfaced); 10 knots (19 km/h; 12 mph) (submerged)
- Range: 14,000 nautical miles (26,000 km) at 7 knots (13 km/h; 8.1 mph); 90 nautical miles (170 km) at 7 knots (submerged)
- Test depth: 80 m (260 ft)
- Complement: 5 officers (6 in operations); 79 enlisted
- Armament: 11 torpedo tubes; 1 × 100 mm (3.9 in) gun; 1 × 13.2 mm (0.52 in) machine gun

Prométhée (Q153) was a Redoutable-class submarine of the French Navy, launched in 1930 at Cherbourg. On 7 July 1932, while sailing on the surface during sea trials, she suddenly sank off Cape Lévi, Manche. 62 of her 69 crew were lost with her, causing an outpouring of grief in France. The wreck was located the following day, but attempts to rescue any survivors and refloat the vessel were in vain. Survivors' statements indicated that the sinking was likely due to a sudden opening of the diving purges.

== Characteristics and launching ==
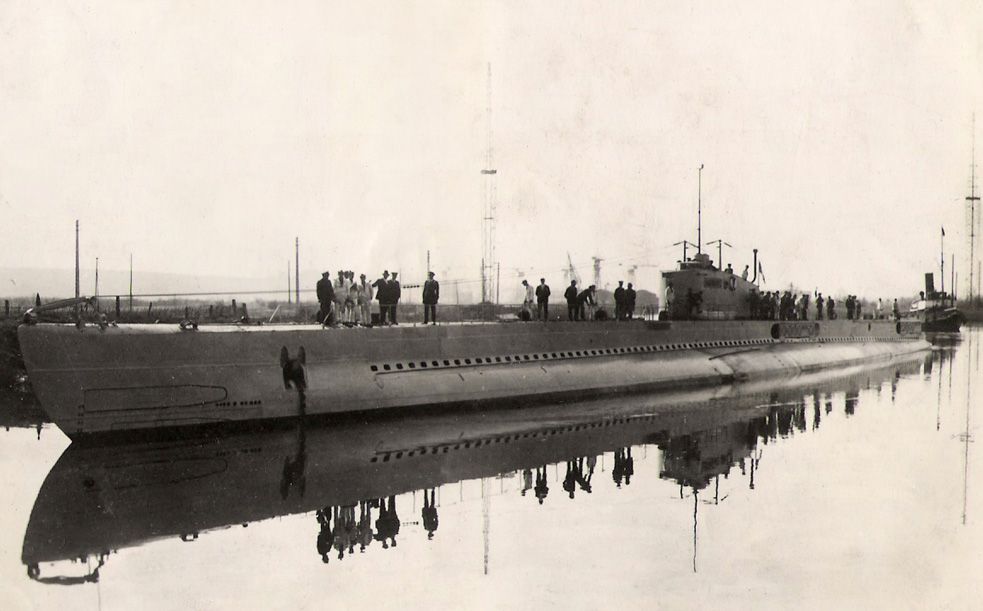
Prométhée

Prométhée was one of 31 Redoutable-class submarines, also designated as the 1500-ton boats because of their displacement. The class entered service between 1931 and 1939.

92.3 m (302 ft 10 in) long, with a beam of 8.2 m (26 ft 11 in) and a draught of 4.9 m (16 ft 1 in), she could dive up to 80 m (260 ft). Redoutable-class submarines had a surfaced displacement of 1,572 tonnes (1,547 long tons) and a submerged displacement of 2,082 tonnes (2,049 long tons). Propulsion while surfaced was provided by two 4,474 kW (6,000 hp) diesel motors, with a maximum speed of 18.6 knots (34.4 km/h; 21.4 mph). The submarines' electrical propulsion allowed them to attain speeds of 10 knots (19 km/h; 12 mph) while submerged. Designated as "grand cruise submarines" (French: "sous-marins de grande croisière"), their surfaced range was 10,000 nautical miles (20,000 km; 10,000 mi) at 10 knots, and 14,000 nautical miles (30,000 km; 20,000 mi) at 7 knots (10 km/h; 10 mph), with a submerged range of 100 nautical miles (0 km; 0 mi) at 5 knots (10 km/h; 10 mph).

Ordered in 1927, Prométhée was laid down on 10 January 1928 at the arsenal of Cherbourg. She was launched on 23 October 1930, with work preparing her for service continuing up until her sinking. An incident occurred during the launching, when Prométhée headed out of the respective axe with a forte gîte.

Prométhée began trials on 1 December 1931. Her commander was the 38-year-old Lieutenant de vaisseau Amaury Couespel du Mesnil. Couespel du Mesnil entered the École Navale in 1915. After training at the submarine school he served as second in command of the submarine René Audry, then as commander of submarine Aurore. The commandant selected his crew and chose as officers Lieutenant de vaisseau Jacques Fourcault, Enseigne de vaisseau André Bienvenue, and engineer-mechanic Louis Bouthier. Lieutenant de vaisseau Fourcault had recently been promoted to this rank, while Enseigne de vaisseau Bienvenue was going to sea for the first time.

== Sinking ==
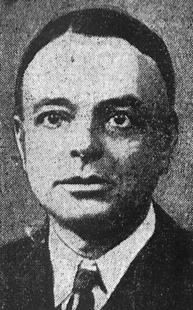
Amaury Couespel du Mesnil, commander of Prométhée

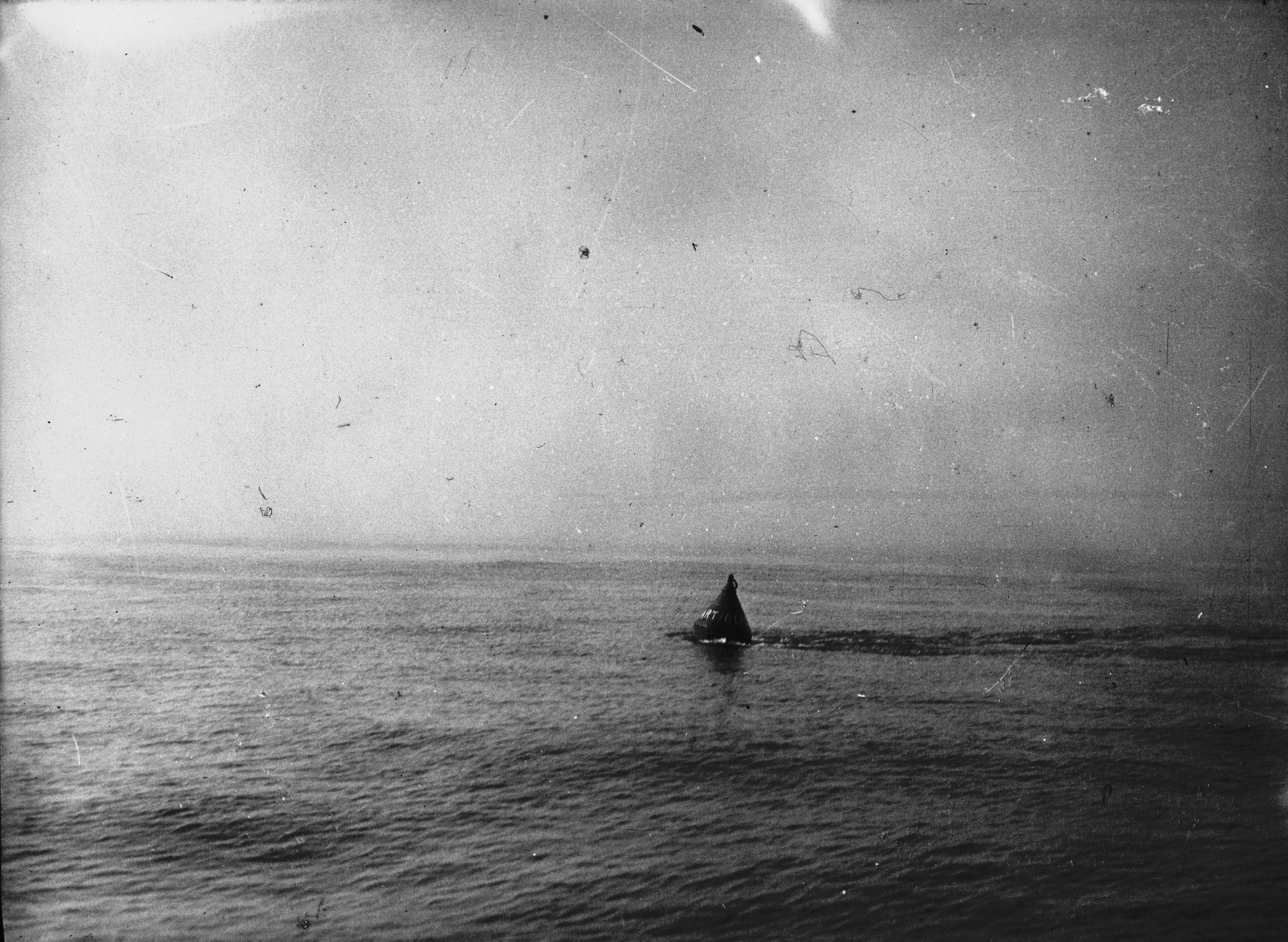
Buoy indicating the site of the wreck of Prométhée

The submarine was nearing completion a year after her launch, and was to carry out a series of trials before being commissioned. Prométhée left Cherbourg on 7 July 1932 at about 0900 hours, sailing in a northern-east direction. This was the boat's fifth sea voyage. That day's trials consisted of exercising the electrical motors and testing the diesel motors used for surface propulsion. The crew supplemented by sixteen workers from Cherbourg, five engineers and workers from Creusot and one other worker. Trials were conducted under the joint responsibility of the boat's commander and the marine engineer Ambroise Aveline.

According to Prométhée's commander, the tests on the electrical motors to ensure propulsion while submerged, were completed a little before noon on 7 July. Prométhée was stationary 7 nautical miles (13 km; 8.1 mi) off Cap Lévi, close to the commune of Fermanville. Enseigne Bienvenue assumed the watch at the top of the conning tower, while a couple of sailors were having lunch on the bridge. Engineer Aveline ordered the start of trials for the diesel motors, while in the officers' mess, Cousepel du Mesnil heard the sounds of compressed air which he interpreted as skipped motor start-up revolutions. A couple of seconds later, he heard a commotion on the bridge and the conning tower, which he thought might indicate that a sailor had fallen overboard. While ascending the conning tower, he clearly heard the ballast purges opening, without noticing anyone at the electrical controls. Upon arriving at the top of the conning tower, he realized that the submarine was sinking quickly by the stern. Enseigne Bienvenue ordered the opening of the purges and the closing of the hatches which allowed passage between the submarine's exterior and interior. Sailors Pourre, Kermoal, and Antonio descended into the Prométhée, closing the hatches behind them. They received citations in recognition of this act of courage. Couespel du Mesnil ordered buoys and gratings to be thrown overboard. The submarine's rate of sinking increased, water flooding into the diesel exhausts. The commander was washed into the water with almost fifteen individuals present on the bridge at that moment. The submarine sank at a maximum angle, which Couespel du Mesnil estimated an angle of almost 80° in relation to the horizontal axes: Prométhée was sinking in a vertical dive. The sinking took less than a minute.

Seven sailors, including Lieutenant de vaisseau Couespel de Mesnil and Enseigne de vaisseau Bienvenue, survived for one hour in the water until they were rescued by fisherman Yves Nicol in his boat Yvette II.

Sixty-two men were lost with the submarine. The trial program for testing surface propulsion had not envisaged diving manoeuvres, and thus Prométhée was not prepared to carry out this type of manoeuvre. The first submergence trial had been scheduled to take place on 20 July. The boat had no reserve oxygen, and the bottles of compressed air which allowing the emptying of the ballast tanks for surfacing were empty. As news of the loss reached shore it became clear to the military and civilian authorities at Cherbourg that any rescue would have to be carried out within a couple of hours. An investigative committee determined that the crew did not survive more than a couple of minutes following the sinking, after the submarine was completely flooded.

== Rescue and salvage attempts ==
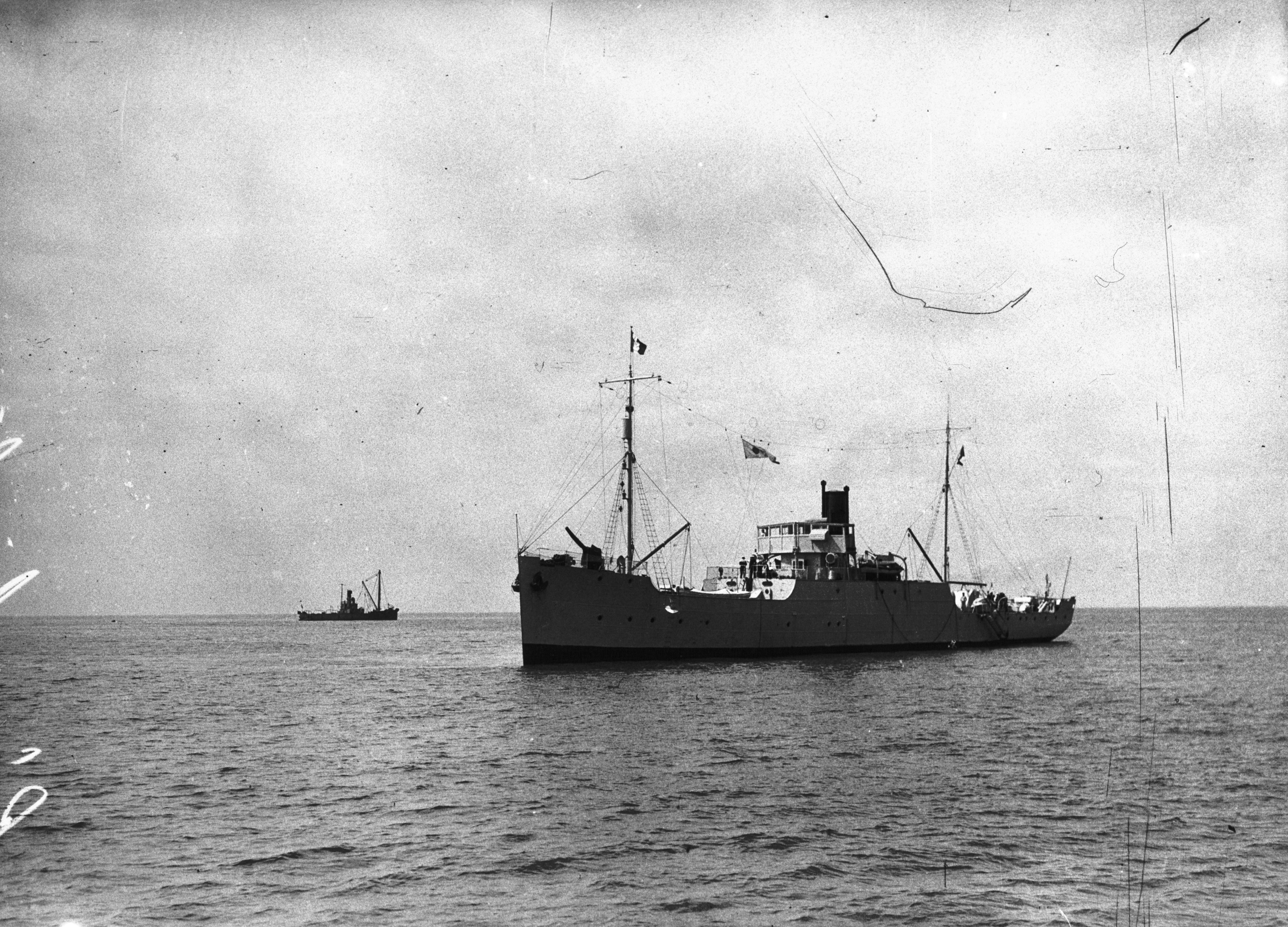
The rescue ships Artiglio and Ailette at the wreck site

News of the sinking arrived at Cherbourg with the return of Yves II in the middle of the afternoon. Several ships immediately made their way to the wreck site, aided by navy seaplanes. International assistance was quickly coordinated. Two rescue ships of the Italian society for maritime rescue recuperation, Artiglio and Rostro, which had already been used in several wrecks in the 1920s due to their intervention in several maritime wrecks, were dispatched the site. Artiglio sailed from Le Havre, and Rostro from Brest, with the two ships arriving at Cherbourg on the morning of 9 July. A diving suit was sent by train from the naval base at Toulon.

On 8 July the aviso Ailette spotted Prométhée's telephonic buoy. It was impossible to establish whether it had been triggered automatically or deployed by the crew. Several attempts were made to use it to contact the crew. Two series of telephone calls were made via the buoy on 8 July and 9 July, but not response was received. The submarines Aurore, Eurydice and the Polish torpedo boat ORP Burza made underwater submarine signal recognitions in an attempt to detect any activity in the submarine.

The first dives on the wreck, lying 75 metres (246 ft) under water, began on 9 July towards 1600. Diving teams from Fidèle and Artiglio struck the hull with hammers in an attempt to contact survivors, but received no response. Forty hours after the wreck it was concluded that no oxygen would have been left in the wrecked submarine, and consequently there could not be any survivors.

International experts were consulted - notably Mario Raffaeli, technical director of the Italian society of maritime rescue recuperation, and Ernest Cox, who supervised the salvage of German ships from Scapa Flow - in order to assess the possibility of refloating Prométhée for investigative purposes and to recover the bodies of her crew. All concluded that salvaging the wreck was impossible, given the depth it lay at and the force of the tidal currents in the region. The idea of salvaging the wreck was officially abandoned on 14 July.

== Causes of the sinking ==
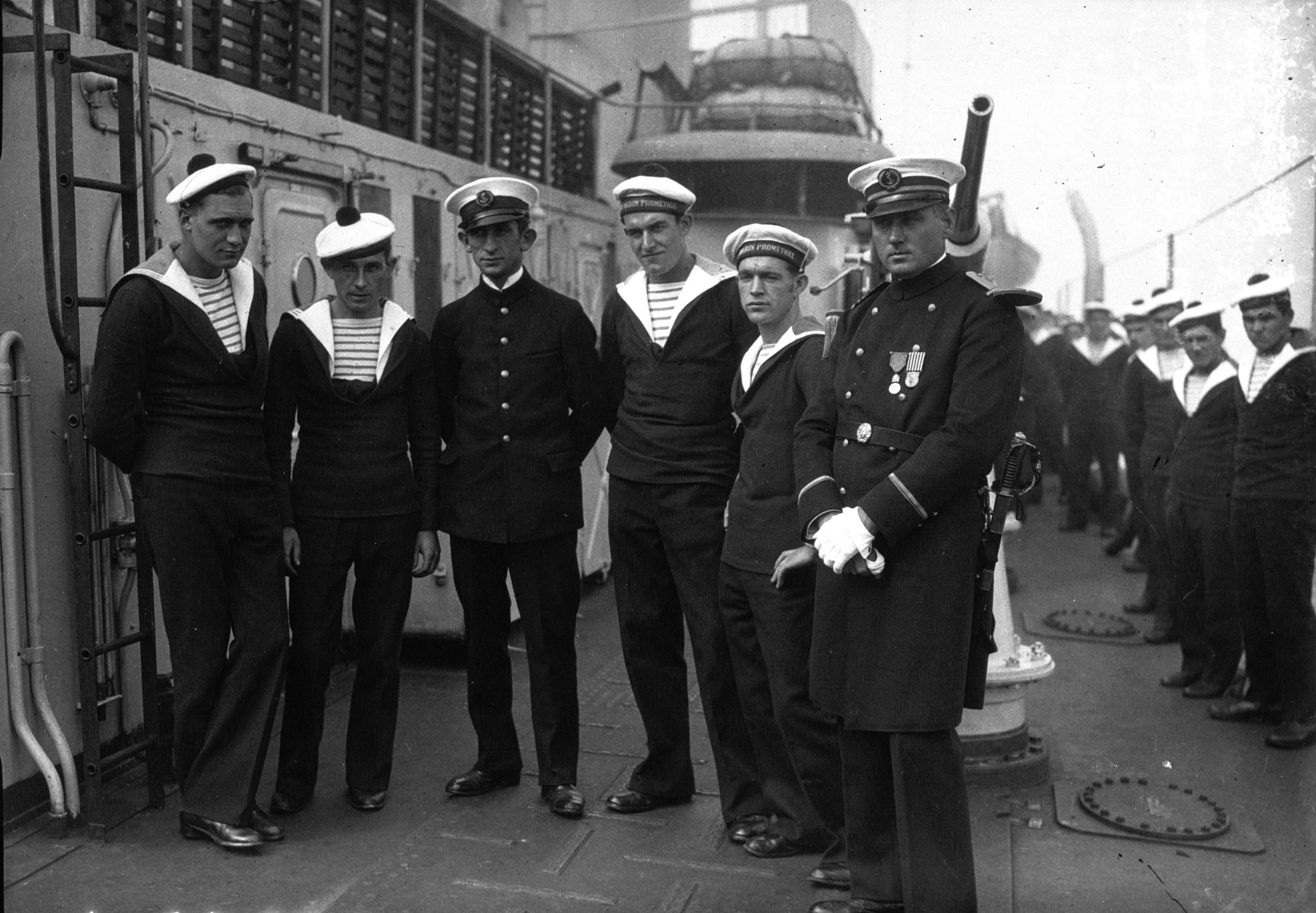
Survivors of the wreck, including Second maître Goasguen in the centre and Premier maître François Prigent on the right

In the evening of 8 July Vice-admiral Le Dô, maritime prefect of Cherbourg, established an investigative commission to discover the causes of the sudden sinking. Unable to examine the wreck, the commission was unable to use physical evidence, and had to rely on interviews with the survivors, including the commander of Prométhée, Lieutenant de vaisseau Couespel du Mesnil, and conducting similar trial simulations on Prométhée's sister ship Archimède.

Engineers studied how the Archimède submerged in as orderly and quick a manner as possible, to compare with what had happened to Prométhée. The Redoutable-class submarines were able to fully submerge in thirty seconds. Prométhée was still undergoing trials, and it was one of the boat's first voyages at sea. As the commander had not seen anyone at the command post, and the accident occurred when the order was given to start the diesel motors, the commission concluded on 13 July that an "unexpected, rapid and general opening of the purges" had flooded the ballast tanks with water, which rendered the submarine heavy and sank her. This unexpected opening could have been due to an error, or connectivity in the oleo-pneumatic section valve systems. This design flaw was well known prior to the loss of Prométhée: a similar incident had occurred within gravity on Redoutable and Vengeur. The incident aboard the Vengeur had been reported by her commander in a verbal-process hearing in November 1929, and had been confirmed by the testimony of the commander of Surcouf in 1930. However no official instructions had been issued to commanders of French submarines. Following the loss of Prométhée, all related section valves were modified on French submarines.

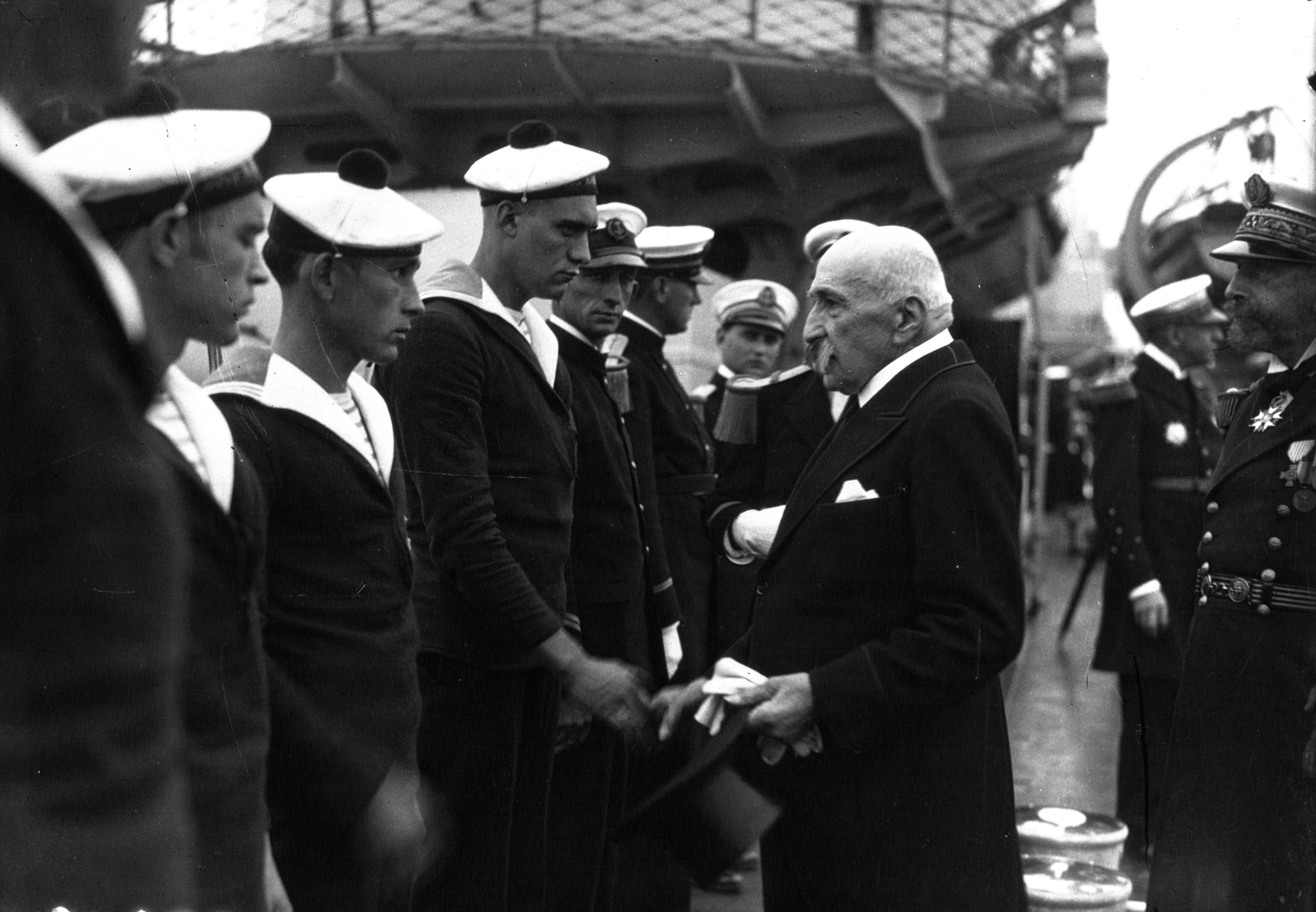
The survivors of the wreck with naval minister Georges Leygues

Deep sea navy divers examined the hatches around the bridge and observed that all of those they could see were closed. It was not possible to inspect all the hatches, as the steep angle at which Prométhée had sunk at suggested that one hatch could have been left open, allowing water to enter the submarine, and sink her.

Lieutenant de vaisseau Amaury Couespel du Mesnil was summoned before the war council on 3 November 1932, in order to answer for the loss of his boat. He was unanimously acquitted the following day. His career stalled however, and he ended up leaving the naval service a couple of years after the wreck. Enseigne Bienvenue was killed on 23 September 1940, during the Battle of Dakar.

== Aftermath ==
The loss of Prométhée produced an outpouring of emotion across France and Europe. The Bastille Day events of 14 July were cancelled in numerous cities, including Cherbourg. A ceremony of national mourning was held on 30 July at Cherbourg and at the wreck site, in the presence of the Council president Édouard Herriot and Naval minister Georges Leygues.

Donations from across France funded the erection of a monument in the form of a cross at the point on shore closest to the wreck site, commemorating those lost. A street in Dunkirk was named after Prométhée, in honour of the 19 sailors from the town who were lost with her. Prométhée, with her submerged displacement of 2,082 tons, is the largest submarine lost in the English Channel. A second Redoutable-class submarine was lost in an accident before the Second World War; Phénix was lost off Indochina on 15 June 1939.
