= French submarine Pasteur =

Submarine, built 1932

Pasteur
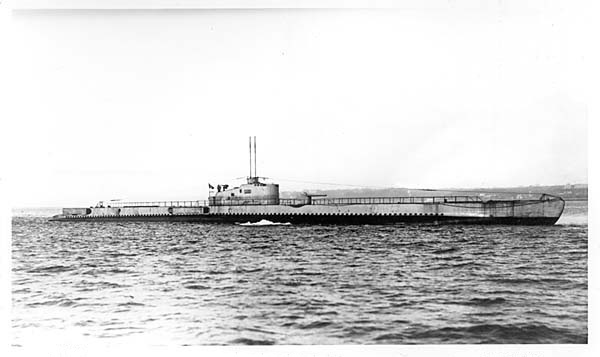
- Pasteur′s sister ship Ajax in 1930.

History

France
- Name: Pasteur
- Namesake: Louis Pasteur (1822–1895), French chemist and microbiologist
- Operator: French Navy
- Builder: Arsenal de Brest, Brest, France
- Laid down: 5 July 1926
- Launched: 19 August 1928
- Commissioned: 1 September 1932
- Home port: Brest, France
- Fate: Scuttled 18 June 1940

General characteristics
- Class & type: Redoutable-class submarine
- Displacement: 1,572 tonnes (1,547 long tons) (surfaced); 2,092 tonnes (2,059 long tons) (submerged)
- Length: 92.3 m (302 ft 10 in)
- Beam: 8.1 m (26 ft 7 in)
- Draft: 4.4 m (14 ft 5 in) (surfaced)
- Propulsion: 2 × diesel engines, 6,000 hp (4,474 kW); 2 × electric motors, 2,250 hp (1,678 kW)
- Speed: 17.5 kn (32.4 km/h; 20.1 mph) (surfaced); 10 kn (19 km/h; 12 mph) (submerged)
- Range: 14,000 nmi (26,000 km; 16,000 mi) at 7 kn (13 km/h; 8.1 mph) (surfaced); 10,000 nmi (19,000 km; 12,000 mi) at 10 kn (19 km/h; 12 mph) (surfaced); 4,000 nmi (7,400 km; 4,600 mi) at 17 kn (31 km/h; 20 mph) (surfaced); 90 nmi (170 km; 100 mi) at 7 kn (13 km/h; 8.1 mph) (submerged)
- Test depth: 80 m (262 ft)
- Complement: 5 officers (6 in operations); 66 men
- Armament: 11 torpedo tubes; 1 × 100 mm (3.9 in) gun; 1 × 13.2 mm (0.5 in) machine gun

Pasteur was a French Navy Redoutable-class submarine of the M6 series commissioned in 1932. She participated in World War II until she was scuttled in June 1940.

== Characteristics ==
Profile of Casabianca, sister ship of Pasteur.

Pasteur was part of a fairly homogeneous series of 31 deep-sea patrol submarines also called "1,500-tonners" because of their displacement. All entered service between 1931 and 1939.

The Redoutable-class submarines were 92.3 metres (302 ft 10 in) long and 8.1 metres (26 ft 7 in) in beam and had a draft of 4.4 metres (14 ft 5 in). They could dive to a depth of 80 metres (262 ft). They displaced 1,572 tonnes (1,547 long tons) on the surface and 2,082 tonnes (2,049 long tons) underwater. Propelled on the surface by two diesel engines producing a combined 6,000 horsepower (4,474 kW), they had a maximum speed of 18.6 knots (34.4 km/h; 21.4 mph). When submerged, their two electric motors produced a combined 2,250 horsepower (1,678 kW) and allowed them to reach 10 knots (19 km/h; 12 mph). Also called “deep-cruising submarines”, their range on the surface was 10,000 nautical miles (19,000 km; 12,000 mi) at 10 knots (19 km/h; 12 mph). Underwater, they could travel 100 nautical miles (190 km; 120 mi) at 5 knots (9.3 km/h; 5.8 mph).

== Construction and commissioning ==
Laid down at Arsenal de Brest in Brest, France, on 5 July 1926 with the hull number Q139, Pasteur was launched on 19 August 1928. She was commissioned on 1 September 1932.

== Service history ==
On 12 May 1936, Pasteur and the destroyer L'Indomptable collided at the mouth of the Gironde during an exercise of the 2nd Light Squadron.

In 1937, Pasteur received orders to make an endurance cruise to Douala, French Cameroon, in company with her sister ship Achille.

=== World War II ===
At the start of World War II in September 1939, Pasteur was assigned to the 2nd Submarine Division in the 4th Submarine Squadron in the 1st Flotilla, a component of the Forces de haute mer (High Seas Force), based at Brest. Her sister ships Achille, Casabianca, and Sfax made up the rest of the division.

On either 3 or 14 September 1939, according to different sources, the four submarines of the 2nd Submarine Division as well as their sister ships Agosta and Ouessant received orders to establish a standing patrol off the coast of Spain. The six submarines spent six weeks patrolling off Vigo, where part of the German merchant fleet — which the Allies suspected of serving as supply ships for German U-boats — had taken refuge at the start of the war. One source specifies that Pasteur, Casabianca, and Sfax rotated on patrol off Vigo beginning on 1 October 1939. Before their patrols ended on 30 or 31 October 1939, according to different sources, the six French submarines had spent a combined 67 days at sea on patrol in very harsh conditions with no results.

On 14 November 1939, the 2nd Submarine Division received orders to proceed to Halifex, Nova Scotia, Canada, to take part in Allied convoy operations in the Atlantic Ocean. Fighting bad weather, Pasteur, Achille, Casabianca, and Sfax arrived at Halifax at 07:30 on 25 November 1939,. where the British Royal Navy submarines HMS Cachalot, HMS Narwhal, HMS Porpoise, and HMS Seal joined them for convoy escort operations on 26 November 1939. During the winter of 1939–1940, the submarines escorted three convoys from Halifax to the United Kingdom, always in difficult weather conditions.

Beginning on 22 March 1940, the division was based at Harwich on the North Sea coast of England. On 17 April 1940, the division moved to Dundee, Scotland, to operate in the North Sea in support of Allied forces fighting in the Norwegian campaign as German forces began their conquest of Norway. While departing Dundee for her first Norwegian patrol on 18 April 1940, Pasteur collided with Achille, suffering damage to one of her diving planes and one of her propeller shafts. She was towed first to Cherbourg, France, and then to Brest for repairs, arriving there under tow by the tug Abeille 4 on 15 June 1940.

German ground forces advanced into France on 10 May 1940, beginning the Battle of France, and Italy declared war on France on 10 June 1940 and joined the invasion. Pasteur was unable to move under her own power as German forces approached Brest. To prevent the Germans from capturing her, she was scuttled at Brest at 19:00 on 18 June 1940. The Battle of France ended in France's defeat and armistices with Germany on 22 June 1940 and with Italy on 24 June, both of which went into effect on 25 June 1940. The Germans later refloated Pasteur′s wreck to clear the berth.
