= French submarine Bévéziers (1935) =

1935 French submarine

Bévéziers
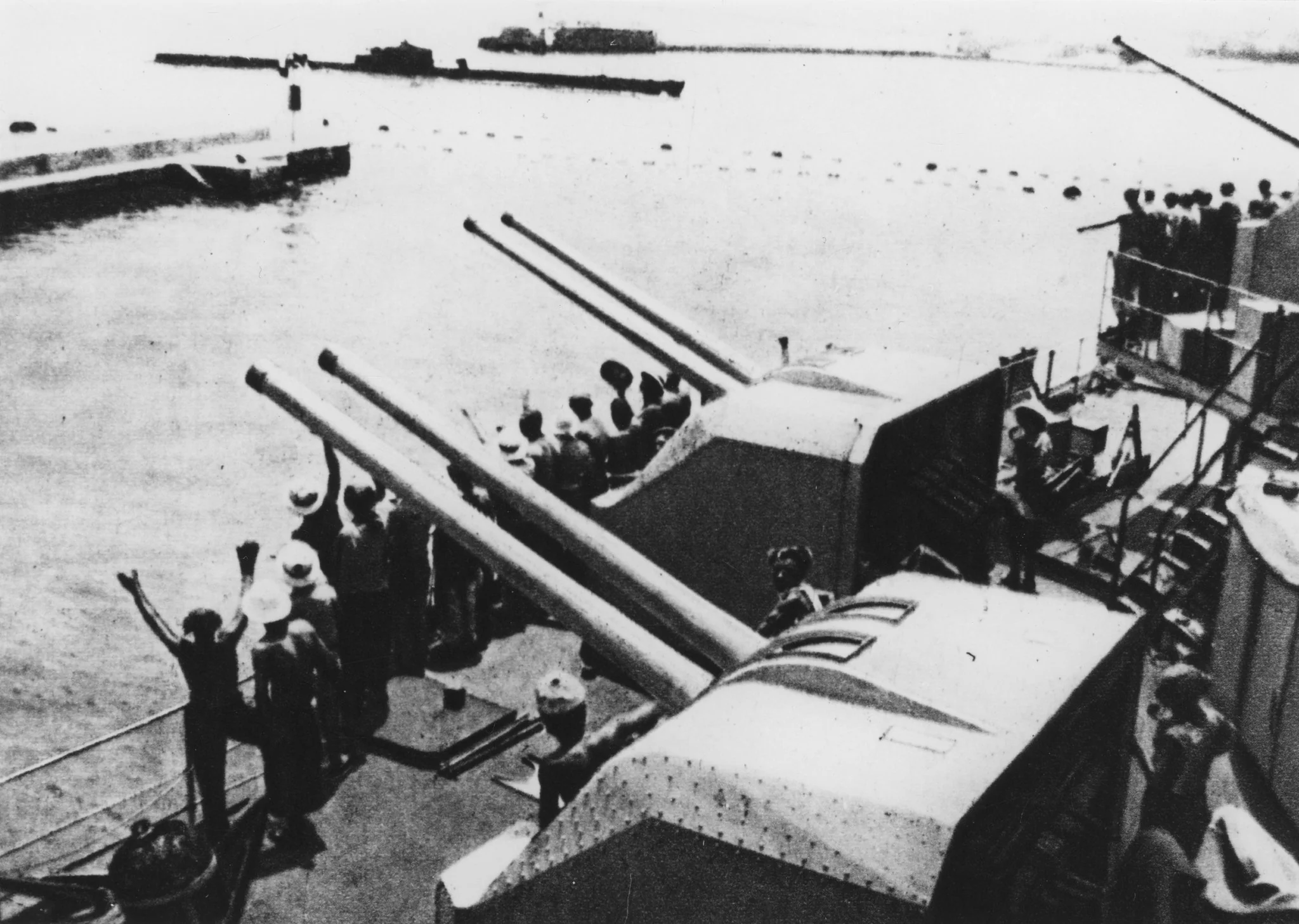
- Bévéziers returning to the port of Dakar after torpedoing HMS Resolution, 25 September 1940

History

France
- Name: Bévéziers
- Namesake: Battle of Bévéziers
- Laid down: 4 April 1932
- Launched: 14 October 1935
- Commissioned: 4 June 1937
- Stricken: 1946, following reserve refitting by the Allies in 1943
- Homeport: Toulon
- Fate: Sunk 5 May 1942

General characteristics
- Class & type: Redoutable-class submarine
- Displacement: 1,384 long tons (1,406 t) standard; 1,570 long tons (1,595 t) normal; 2,084 long tons (2,117 t) submerged
- Length: 92.30 m (302 ft 10 in) oa; 92.00 m (301 ft 10 in) pp
- Beam: 8.20 m (26 ft 11 in)
- Draught: 4.70 m (15 ft 5 in)
- Propulsion: 2 diesels, 8,000 shp (6,000 kW) total, 2 electric motors 2,000 shp (1,500 kW)
- Speed: 20 knots (37 km/h; 23 mph)(surfaced); 10 knots (19 km/h; 12 mph)
- Range: 10,000 nmi (18,500 km; 11,500 mi) at 10 kn (19 km/h; 12 mph); 4,000 nmi (7,400 km; 4,600 mi) at 17 kn (31 km/h; 20 mph); 100 nmi (190 km; 120 mi) at 5 kn (9 km/h; 6 mph) submerged
- Complement: 61
- Armament: 4 × fixed 550 mm (21.7 in) torpedo tubes in bow, 5 × 550 mm (21.7 in) and 2 × 400 mm (15.7 in) torpedo tubes on external mounts; 1 × 100 mm gun; 1 × 13.2 mm machine gun

Bévéziers (Q179) was a Redoutable-class submarine of the French Navy. The class is also known as the "1500-ton class" and were termed in French French: « de grande patrouille». She was named after the 1690 Battle of Beachy Head, known in France as the Bataille de Bévéziers.

== History ==
=== Development ===
Bévéziers was one of 31 Redoutable-class submarines, also designated as the 1500 ton boats because of their displacement. The class entered service between 1931 and 1939.

92.3 m (302 ft 10 in) long, with a beam of 8.2 m (26 ft 11 in) and a draught of 4.9 m (16 ft 1 in), she could dive up to 80 m (260 ft). Redoutable-class submarines had a surfaced displacement of 1,572 tonnes (1,547 long tons) and a submerged displacement of 2,082 tonnes (2,049 long tons). Propulsion while surfaced was provided by two 6,000 hp (4,474 kW) diesel motors, with a maximum speed of 20 knots (37 km/h; 23 mph). The submarines' electrical propulsion allowed them to attain speeds of 10 knots (19 km/h; 12 mph) while submerged. Designated as "grand cruise submarines" (French: « sous-marins de grande croisière »), their surfaced range was 10,000 nautical miles (20,000 km) at 10 knots (20 km/h), and 14,000 nautical miles (30,000 km) at 7 knots (10 km/h), with a submerged range of 100 nautical miles (0 km) at 5 knots (10 km/h).

Laid down on 4 April 1932, Bévéziers was launched on 14 October 1935 and commissioned on 4 June 1937.

=== Second World War ===
At the beginning of the Second World War Bévéziers was assigned to the 8th Submarine Division, based in Brest, alongside her sisters Agosta, Ouessant and Sidi-Ferruch.

On the declaration of war on 3 September 1939, Bévéziers was sent to patrol the ports on the northern Spanish coastline, where part of the German commercial fleet had taken refuge, and were suspected of supplying German U-boats. At the beginning of October, the boat was sent with the 8th Division to the Antilles. The submarine then escorted two convoys, HX 29 and HX 33 from Halifax, Nova Scotia to Liverpool, returning to Brest on 20 April 1940. Following some repairs and refitting, the Bévéziers was sent to Casablanca, and was there when the armistice between France and Germany was concluded on 20 June 1940. The submarine then patrolled the Gulf of Guinea and returned to Dakar on 21 August 1940.

Under the command of Capitaine de corvette Lancelot, Bévéziers was in dock at Dakar when, on 23 September, Free French and British forces attacked the city. The repair was quickly abandoned and the submarine was hastily refloated. Bévéziers went on to torpedo the British battleship HMS Resolution on 25 September, damaging her and putting her out of action for nearly nine months.

On 28 October Bévéziers joined Casabianca, Sfax and Sidi-Ferruch to form the 2nd Submarine Division, based in Casablanca. She then sailed to Toulon on 3 January 1941, where she was placed under guard before undergoing a refit. On 12 November the boat was rearmed and sent to Madagascar, where she arrived on 19 February 1942.

On 5 May 1942, the submarine was taken by surprise during the preliminary bombardments which began the Battle of Madagascar. She quickly put to sea with two thirds of her crew at 0600. Three Fairey Swordfish fired on the boat, which changed course to evade attack. She came under continued attack, which damaged the boat's hull. One of the three Swordfish managed to dismount Bévéziers's machine gun, causing the disappearance of two of the crew and the wounding of four more. The submarine then sank.

Recovered and refitted by the Allies the following year and placed in reserve, the submarine was scrapped in 1946. A large part of the boat's hull was nevertheless still visible in 2004 in the Port de la Nièvre at Antsiranana.
