= Redoutable-class submarine (1928) =

French class of submarine

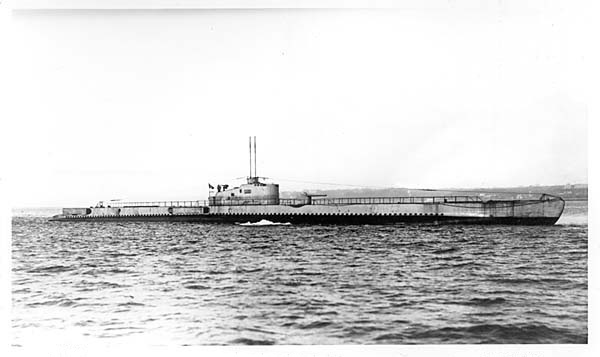
- The Redoutable-class Ajax, circa 1930

Class overview
- Name: Redoutable class
- Builders: Arsenal de Brest, Brest, France; Arsenal de Cherbourg, Cherbourg, France; Arsenal de Lorient, Lorient, France; Ateliers et Chantiers de la Loire, Saint-Nazaire, France; Ateliers et Chantiers de Saint-Nazaire Penhoët, Saint-Nazaire, France; Chantiers Dubigeon, Nantes, France; Chantiers Navals Français, Blainville-sur-Orne, Caen, France; Forges et Chantiers de la Méditerranée, La Seyne-sur-Mer, France
- Operators: French Navy; Free French Naval Forces; Vichy French Navy
- Subclasses: Type I – Le Redoutable; Type II – Le Pascal
- Completed: 31
- Lost: 26
- Retired: 5

General characteristics
- Type: Submarine
- Displacement: 1,500 tonnes (1,476 long tons) (surfaced); 2,000 tonnes (1,968 long tons) (submerged)
- Length: 92.3 m (302 ft 10 in)
- Beam: 8.2 m (26 ft 11 in)
- Draught: 4.9 m (16 ft 1 in)
- Installed power: 6,000–8,000 bhp (4,500–6,000 kW) (diesels); 2,000 shp (1,500 kW) (electric motors)
- Propulsion: 2 × diesel engines; 2 × electric motors
- Speed: 17–20 knots (31–37 km/h; 20–23 mph) (surfaced); 10 knots (19 km/h; 12 mph) (submerged)
- Range: 14,000 nmi (26,000 km; 16,000 mi) at 7 knots (13 km/h; 8.1 mph) (surfaced); 90 nmi (170 km; 100 mi) at 7 knots (13 km/h; 8.1 mph) (submerged)
- Test depth: 80 m (260 ft)
- Complement: 5 officers (6 in operations); 79 men
- Armament: 9 × 550 mm (21.7 in) torpedo tubes; 2 × 400 mm (15.7 in) torpedo tubes; 1 × 100 mm (3.9 in) deck gun; 2 × 13.2 mm (0.52 in) machine guns

The Redoutable-class submarines were a group of 31 submarines built between 1924 and 1937 for the French Navy. Most of the class saw service during the Second World War. The class is also known in French as the Classe 1 500 tonnes, and they were designated as "First Class submarines", or "large submarine cruisers". They are known as the Redoutable class in reference to the lead boat Redoutable, in service from 1931 to 1942. The class is divided into two sub-class series, Type I, known as Le Redoutable and Type II, Pascal.

Although these were modern submarines when they were designed, they quickly became outdated and were approaching obsolescence by the beginning of the Second World War. The conditions of the Armistice of 22 June 1940 prevented the Vichy government from carrying out a modernization programme. 24 out of the 29 units that served in the war were lost. Used in the defence of the Second French colonial empire under the Vichy regime, submarines of the class saw action against Allied offensives at the Battles of Dakar, Libreville and Madagascar. Many of the submarines of the class came under Allied control after the Allied landings in North Africa. Few however saw much further active service after this due to a period of refitting and alterations done in the United States between February 1943 and March 1945. One exception was Casabianca, which took part in the liberation of Corsica. The surviving submarines were largely used for training purposes after the war, with the last of them being disarmed in 1952.

== Development ==
=== Context ===
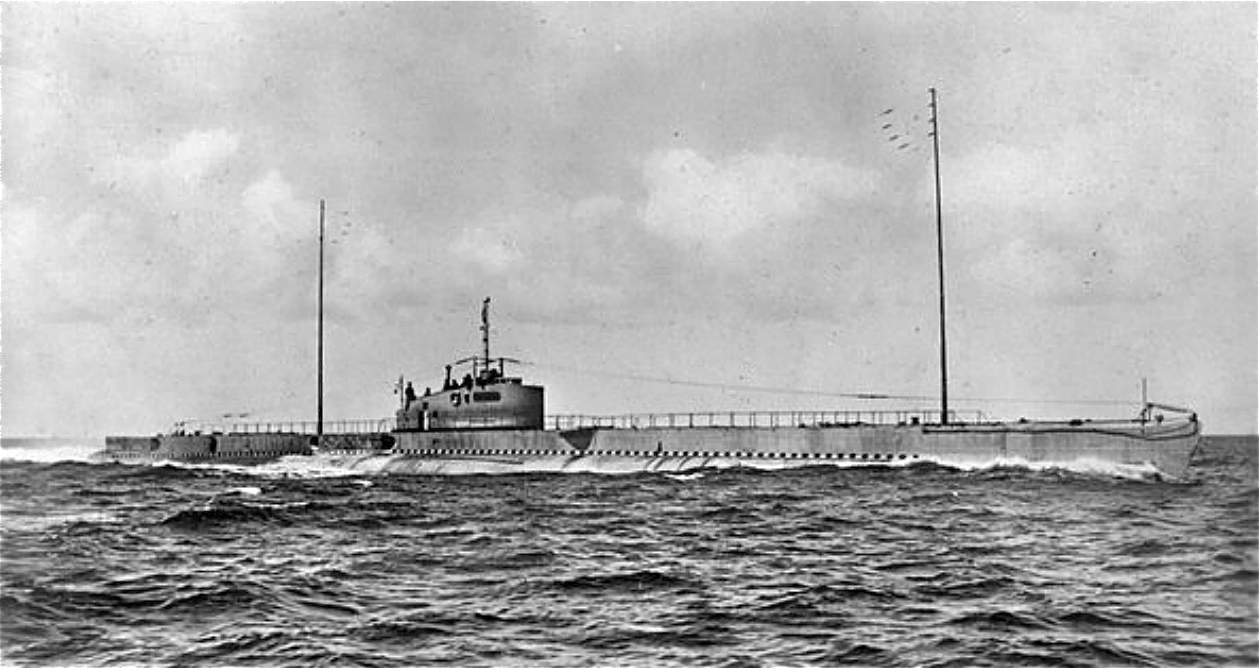
Prométhée, with Wireless transmitter masts hoisted, during trials before sinking in 1932. The 100 mm deck gun had not yet been installed.

The Washington Naval Treaty of 1922 sought to prevent a future naval arms race by imposing limits on the number and size of certain types of warships that each great power could possess. France sought to expand its submarine forces – which were not limited by the treaty – as an essential tool to defend its coastline and empire. The 1100-ton Requin-class submarines, designed in 1922, was the initial attempt to meet these requirements; however, the speed of the submarines was notably insufficient and the design overall was considered inferior to the last German submarines launched in 1918.

The design for the Requin class's successor was commissioned from general engineer of maritime engineering Léon Roquebert. Roquebert was tasked with creating a "grand cruiser" type of submarine, with the role of carrying out surveillance of an adversary's bases, destroying their communications by attacking their ships, while protecting French colonies. They were operate with a surface squadron and provide clearance of enemy vessels for it.

Construction of the Type I project submarines, starting with Redoutable, was approved by the superior council of the navy on 1 July 1924. The building programme was expanded the following year with the Type II submarines. Together with the submarine cruiser Surcouf, the Redoutable-class submarines constituted the elite of the French submarine fleet.

=== Characteristics ===
92.3 m (302 ft 10 in) long, with a beam of 8.2 m (26 ft 11 in) and a draught of 4.9 m (16 ft 1 in), the Redoutable-class submarines could dive up to 80 m (260 ft), although several, such as Archimède reached depths of 120 m (390 ft) while diving. The submarines had a surfaced displacement of 1,572 tonnes (1,547 long tons) and a submerged displacement of 2,082 tonnes (2,049 long tons). Propulsion while surfaced was provided by two 4,000 hp (3,000 kW) diesel motors for the Redoutable sub-class, while the Pascal variant boats had 6,000 hp (4,500 kW), while the submarines from Agosta onwards had 8,000 hp (6,000 kW), with a maximum speed of 18.6 knots (34.4 km/h). Motors were built by the Swiss manufacturer Sulzer, with the exception of Pasteur, Poncelet, Archimède, Achille, Ajax, Argo, Prométhée, Persée and Le Centaure, which were propelled with Schneider motors. The submarines' electrical propulsion allowed them to attain speeds of 10 knots (19 km/h; 12 mph) while submerged. Designated as "grand cruise submarines" (French: « sous-marins de grande croisière »), their surfaced range was 10,000 nautical miles (19,000 km) at 10 knots (19 km/h), and 14,000 nautical miles (26,000 km) at 7 knots (13 km/h), with a submerged range of 100 nautical miles (190 km) at 5 knots (9.3 km/h). Radio communication was through wireless antenna.

The Redoutable-class submarines had significant firepower. They were equipped with eleven torpedo tubes: four 550 mm (22 in) tubes in fixed positions in the bow, an orientable platform for three 550 mm tubes behind the conning tower, and another orientable platform on the stern composed of two 550 mm and two 400 mm (16 in) tubes. The 550 mm torpedoes were intended for use against large ships, with the 400 mm torpedoes for smaller boats. Torpedoes were propelled by compressed air at a speed of 44 knots (80 km/h), exploding on impact. Torpedoes left a trail on the surface, which allowed the target to see and avoid the torpedo, as well as trace the torpedo back to its origin. The submarines were also fitted with a 100 mm (4 in) deck gun, mounted in front of the conning tower and from 1929, dual anti-aerial 13.2 mm (0.52 in) machine guns.

The Redoutable-class submarines had a quick diving speed, submerging in between 30 and 40 seconds. They had a reputation of handling well while at sea, both at the surface and while diving. Their motors were relatively noisy, as was auxiliary propulsion while submerged, and this constituted the principal criticism of these submarines, despite their reliability. Their speed and powerful armament was balanced against their ability to detect targets, which was essentially by visual sight. They were equipped with three periscopes – an attack periscope, a surveillance periscope, and an auxiliary periscope – and a hydrophone for passive sonar.

Development plan of 1500-ton submarine

== History ==
=== Construction and early service ===
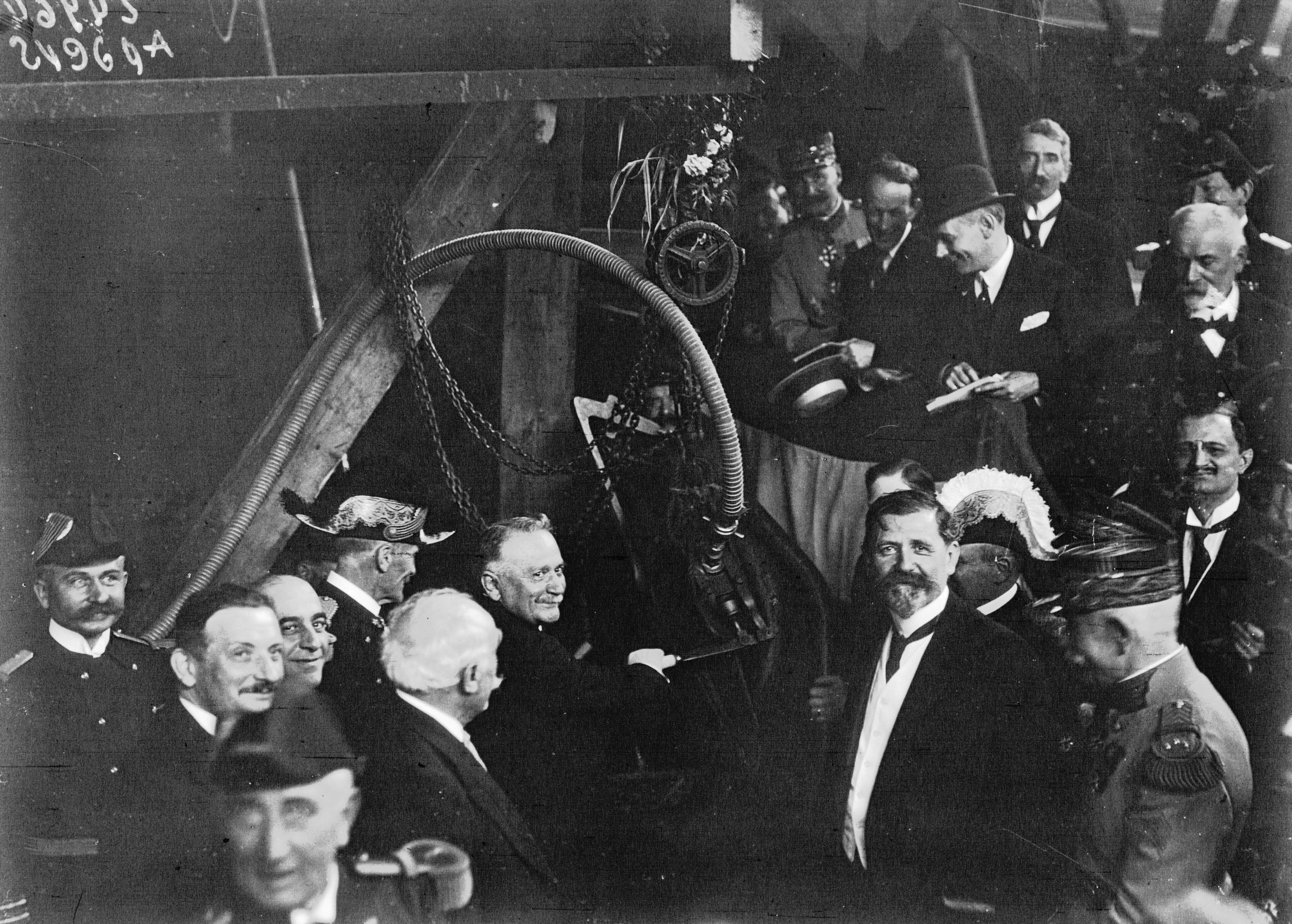
French President Gaston Doumergue lays the first rivet of Redoutable on 17 July 1925 at Cherbourg, in the presence of military and civilian personnel.

The large construction program made it necessary to contract work out to private shipyards, such as those at Caen or on the Loire, as well as the various naval bases. The construction orders were spread over six annual tranches. Small technical alterations were made to the design between orders, utilizing experience gained from previous batches. This did not prevent delays in delivery, which for some orders lasted up to two years and generated design disparities. This absence of standardization had consequences for the maintenance of the submarines, particularly during the Second World War. Laid down on 1 July 1925, the first submarine, Redoutable, was launched on 24 February 1928, and placed in service by 10 July 1931. The 31st and last of the series to be laid down, Casabianca, entered service on 1 January 1937. Ouessant and Sidi-Ferruch were the last to enter service, on 1 January 1939, because of mounting delays at Cherbourg.

The submarines underwent substantial modifications throughout the 1930s, particularly regarding navigational abilities. They conducted training patrols and port visits in the Antilles, along the African coast or in Indochina. Two were lost in accidents before the Second World War: Prométhée sank during trials off the Normandy coast on 7 July 1932, while Phénix was lost off Indochina on 15 June 1939.

=== Second World War ===
==== First actions ====
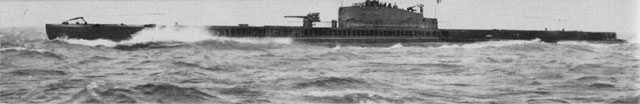
Redoutable underway

At the beginning of Second World War, the Pascal-type vessels were divided between the First Navy Squadron at Brest and the Second Squadron at Toulon. They were assigned to operate with their respective squadrons, attack or capture enemy ships, and protect the Franco-British lines of communication. Two Redoutable-type boats were based at Cherbourg. Designed in 1920s, they were still reliable boats, but were becoming obsolete. They were vulnerable to attacks: their submerged propulsion systems were sensitive to bombardment, their maximum diving depth was limited and became insufficient during the conflict, and their underwater sound systems were weak. They formed 40% of the French submarine fleet, composed of a total of 77 naval vessels.

Between September 1939 and June 1940, the French submarines patrolled in the Northern seas and the Atlantic, particularly off the neutral ports of Spain, the Canary Islands, and the Azores, where part of the German merchant marine had sought refuge, and were suspected of supporting German U-boats. Unlike the German submarine force, French officers were ordered to respect the terms of the London Naval Treaty: the submarines had to announce their presence to merchant ships prior to an attack, and could only fire on the ship when the crew had evacuated it. These precautionary measures reduced the effectiveness of the French submarine force. Redoutable encountered a merchant vessel sailing without lights during the night of 1 November. The vessel refused to comply with a request from the submarine to stop, so the submarine fired warning shots with her 100 mm deck gun. The merchant vessel returned fire. Redoutable then received a message from the British cargo ship Egba, which was reporting that she was under attack by a "U-boat". Realising that the merchant ship she was firing on was a British one, Redoutable ceased the attack.

In December 1939, Fresnel, Achéron, Redoutable, and Le Héros were sent into the Atlantic to search for the German tanker Altmark, which had been supplying the German cruiser Admiral Graf Spee. Altmark, carrying prisoners taken from ships attacked by the German cruiser, evaded detection and sailed towards Norway, where it was eventually captured by British ships in the Altmark incident. During the winter of 1939–1940, Achille, Casabianca, Pasteur, and Sfax escorted three Allied convoys from Halifax, Nova Scotia to the United Kingdom. They were relieved in February by Bévéziers and Sidi-Ferruch, and then, in April, by Archimède and Ajax.

Italy declared war on France on 10 June 1940. Fresnel, Le Tonnant, Redoutable, and Vengeur patrolled along the Tunisian coast to prevent an Italian landing, while Centaure and Pascal conducted surveillance operations south of Sardinia. Archimède participated in Operation Vado. With the German advance in June, the port of Cherbourg and the arsenal of Brest were evacuated, ships principally heading towards Casablanca and Dakar. On 18 June Agosta, Achille, Ouessant and Pasteur were scuttled in the port of Brest, having been prevented from putting to sea.

By the time the armistice was signed on 22 June 1940, not one of the 29 Redoutable class had sunk any German or Italian ships. Only Poncelet had had any success, her crew having boarded the merchant vessel Chemnitz and sailed her to Casablanca. The cause of this lack of success was the utilization of the submarines as escorteurs and squadron eclaireurs, instead of as chasseurs, in strict adherence to the terms of the Treaty of London, coupled with problems associated with the age and obsolescence of the vessels.

=== Vichy service ===
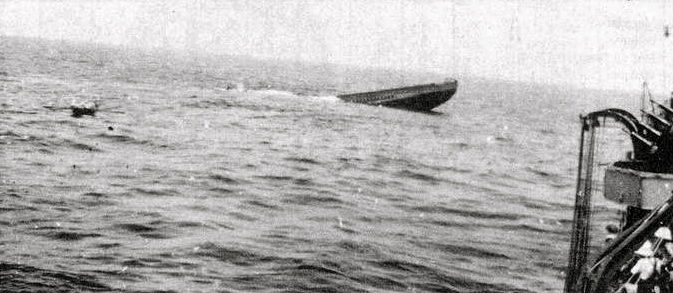
Ajax sinking after being scuttled. The crew were picked up by HMS Fortune

The conditions of the armistice envisaged the return of French naval vessels to their home ports to be disarmed; however, the British attack on Mers-el-Kébir on 3 July convinced the Germans to cancel this plan. The French lost two Redoutable-class submarines during the Battle of Dakar on 23 and 24 September; on 23 September Persée was sunk by two British destroyers after having tried to torpedo HMS Inglefield unsuccessfully; on 24 September Ajax was fired upon by several destroyers escorting the British squadron and was consequently scuttled after the crew abandoned ship. In both cases, the crews were rescued by the British. On 25 September Bévéziers, under the command of Capitaine de corvette Lancelot, attacked and damaged the battleship HMS Resolution, which was out of service for almost nine months.

On 28 October the French naval forces were re-constituted under Vichy government control, under the direction of the German and Italian armistice commissions. Only the Second Submarine Division, consisting of Casabianca, Sfax, Bévéziers and Sidi-Ferruch, based in Casablanca, and the four submarines sent to Madagascar, Vengeur, L'Espoir, Monge and Pégase remained armed. The remainder of the Redoutable class were to be placed under guard at Toulon. Those submarines on active service were relieved one after the other in pairs by units from Toulon, in order to conduct necessary repairs and refits. Defective parts were replaced; however the terms of the armistice prevented upgrades to extend their fighting capabilities.

Poncelet was scuttled on 7 November 1940 during the battle of Libreville after having been damaged by a British sloop. The submarine launched one torpedo against HMS Milford, which the sloop avoided. Severely damaged, Poncelet surfaced and the crew was ordered to evacuate by the captain. However, Commandant Bertrand de Sausssine du Pont de Gault preferred to remain on board and went down with the submarine. Following the attacks of Mers el-Kébir, Dakar and Libreville, the Redoutable-class submarines were redeployed to Toulon, Casablanca, Dakar, Djibouti, Madagascar and Indochina to defend the French colonies. Sfax was accidentally sunk by the German submarine U-37 with the replenishment ship Rhône on 19 December, while they were en route to Dakar to reinforce the fleet based there.

In October 1941, a convoy of four French cargo ships en route towards Dakar was captured by the British. As a reprisal, the French sent Le Glorieux and Le Héros to attack British commerce off the coast of South Africa. On 15 November Le Glorieux unsuccessfully attacked a cargo vessel off Port Elizabeth. Two days later, Le Héros sank the cargo vessel Thode Fagelund off East London, Eastern Cape.

On 31 July 1941, the Japanese invaded French Indochina, where they seized Pégase, which was returning from a mission. Concerned about a possible Japanese attack on Madagascar, which would compromise the security of the supply lines to India, the British led an attack on Diego-Suarez, the principal French base, beginning on 5 May 1942. During the attack, three Redoutable-class submarines were sunk: Bévéziers, and Le Héros by Fairey Swordfish and Monge by destroyers. Monge, after having launched one torpedo at the Illustrious-class aircraft carrier HMS Indomitable, was spotted, fired upon by three destroyers and sunk.

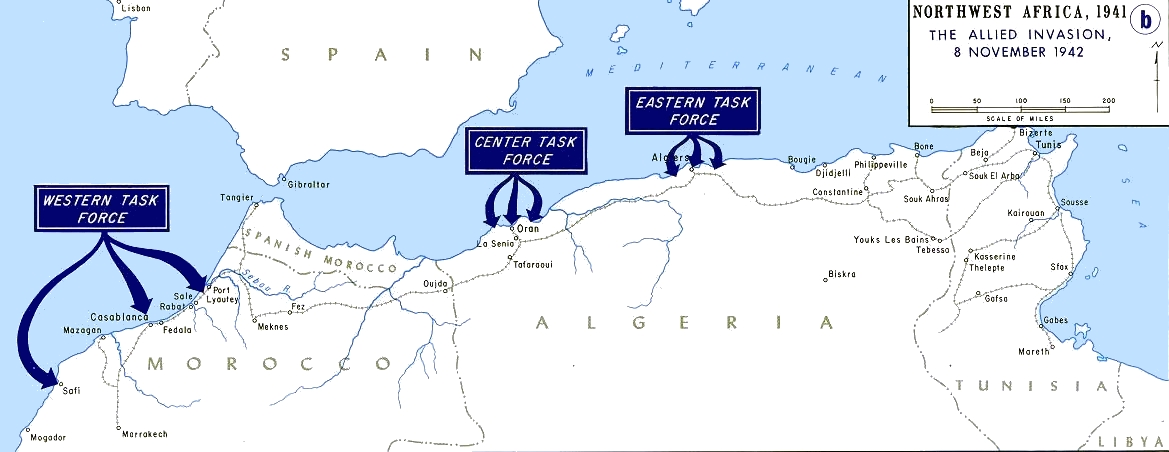
Operation Torch – Allied landings in North Africa, 8 November 1942

The French fleet endured significant losses in the autumn of 1942 during Operation Torch and the scuttling of the French fleet in Toulon. In one month, eleven naval vessels were lost by being sunk or scuttled, in addition to the three submarines sunk during the Battle of Madagascar in May 1942. French forces in North Africa were taken by surprise when the Allied landings began on the morning of 8 November. At Casablanca, the Le Tonnant, Le Conquérant and Sidi-Ferruch came under heavy attack from American aircraft. The commander of Le Tonnant, Lieutenant de vaissau Paumier, was killed, and the commander of Sidi-Ferruch, Capitaine de corvette Laroze, was wounded. On 9 November Le Tonnant launched her last torpedoes against the aircraft carrier USS Ranger, but the carrier evaded them. Le Tonnant was ordered to head to Toulon, but realising that this was impossible, her captain had the crew disembark off Cádiz, and then scuttled the submarine. Despite the ceasefire proclaimed on 11 November, Le Conquérant and Sidi-Ferruch were sunk by American aircraft on 13 November. At Oran, the submarines Actéon and Fresnel put to sea on the night of 8 November. Actéon was sunk a couple of hours later by depth charges from the British destroyer HMS Westcott. Fresnel attacked the cruiser HMS Jamaica, which avoided the torpedoes. Pursued and under attack for the next three days, Fresnel managed evade her attackers and returned to Toulon on 13 November.

Dispositions of the French fleet, prior being scuttled.

On 9 November a number of the French submarines at Toulon, Casabianca, Redoutable, Glorieux, Pascal and Henri Poincaré received authorization from the German and Italian armistice commissions to undergo rearming. On 11 November the Germans enacted Case Anton and moved their forces into the Vichy-controlled area of France. French Navy personnel had to decide between their oath of fidelity to Marshal Philippe Pétain, and their desire to join the Allies in Algeria. Admirals André Marquis, maritime prefect of Toulon, and Jean de Laborde, commander-in-chief of the Toulon squadron, ordered preparations to defend Toulon against an Anglo-American assault, having the Germans' assurance that Toulon would not be occupied. At the same time, they put in place the necessary orders and counter-measures that would ensure the scuttling of the entire fleet, to keep it out of foreign hands, while conforming to an order from Admiral François Darlan dated 24 June 1940. Towards 0430 on 27 November a German force arrived at the arsenal gate, with orders to secure control of the French fleet. The alarm was raised and Admiral de Laborde ordered the immediate scuttling of all naval vessels present at Toulon, based on an order given by another French admiral on 11 November 1942.

Nine Redoutable-class submarines were at Toulon: Fresnel, Achéron, Vengeur, and L'Espoir were in dry docks and the Casabianca, Le Glorieux, Redoutable, Henri Poincare, and Pascal were afloat in the northern bunkers of Mourillon. The last three were not ready for sea and only Le Glorieux and Casabianca had installed their new batteries as well a full load of fuel. As soon as the first shots were fired, the commanders of Le Glorieux and Casabianca moved away from the docks and navigated their submarines towards the exits of the port on electric motors, accompanied by the 600-ton submarine Vénus, the Minerve-class Iris and the Requin-class Marsouin, while under fire from the Germans. Unable to reach the sea, Redoutable, Henri Poincaré, Pascal and Fresnel were scuttled by opening the hatches. Achéron, Vengeur and L'Espoir were sunk by flooding their dry docks. They were later dismantled and scrapped at Toulon or the Italian port of La Spezia, or utilized as floats.

Already having put to sea from Brest on 17 June 1940, the commander of Casabianca had to choose between scuttling his boat in deep waters or sailing to an Allied port to continue the war. Casabianca sailed to Algiers, reaching there on 30 November and joining the Allied forces. Le Glorieux arrived at Oran the same day after a brief stop at Valencia.

=== Service with the Allies ===
Profile view of Casabianca

By the end of 1942, the last six "grand patrol submarines" – Archimède, Casabianca, Le Centaure Le Glorieux, and Protée – were in Africa. Protée, which had been serving with the naval squadron as part of Force X with the British fleet at Alexandria since the armistice in 1940, joined the French fleet in June 1942. The submarines from Africa were assigned to the 8th British Submarine Squadron, then from November 1943, the 10th Squadron. The captured Pégase was commissioned by the Japanese and stationed in Saigon, and then disarmed on 1 January 1944.

Because of their capabilities, the French submarines were principally used by the Allies for missions involving information gathering, and the loading or unloading of personnel or material. Casabianca, the only operational Redoutable-class submarine during most of 1943, carried out seven of these types of missions between December 1942 and September 1943, principally off Italian-occupied Corsica. On 1 July 1943 she landed resistance leader Paulin Colonna d'Istria and 13 tons of material at the beach at Saleccia. On 13 September Casabianca landed 109 men of the 1st Parachute Choc Battalion and their equipment at Ajaccio. Between June and July she also carried out several unsuccessful attacks on the 10,000-ton merchant vessel Champagne.

Protée sailed to Algiers via Oran in November. On her first mission from Algiers she unsuccessfully attacked a German cargo ship. At some point between 18 and 25 December she struck a mine off Marseille and was lost with all hands. It was assumed for some time that Protée had been sunk in an engagement with a German ship while surfaced. However, in 1995 Henri-Germain Delauze, aboard Remora 2000, dived on Protée's wreck and confirmed United States Navy suspicions from the 1950s that Protée had been sunk by a mine. There was also no record of an engagement with a German vessel listed in German archives. On 22 December 1943 Casabianca sank a submarine chaser between Cape Cépet and Cape Sicié. A couple of days later Casabianca torpedoed and damaged the cargo ship Ghisone, which was able to sail to Toulon. On 9 June 1944, Casabianca attacked a German submarine chaser with her deck gun and torpedoes off Cape Camarat, but was unable to seriously damage the vessel. Casabianca gained the nickname "ghost submarine" (French: «le sous-marin fantôme») from the Germans, and was allowed by the 8th Submarine Squadron to fly the Jolly Roger in 1943.

In December 1942 an accord was reached between U.S. and French authorities for the transfer, one by one, of the Redoutable-class submarines to the United States for refitting and modernization, given that their design was by now almost twenty years old. The motors were overhauled, the batteries changed, and the pressure hulls and diving auxiliaries reinforced. The ballasts were also reworked to improve the range of the boats. Efforts were made to improve the soundproofing the submarines. The submarines were equipped with radar, underwater sound systems, better performing asdic, bathythermographs and other capabilities. The living conditions were improved with the installation of air conditioning and a refrigerator. The conning tower was modified, with the removal of various navigational features, which were replaced with an anti-aerial armament. The telescopic masts were also removed. Archimède left Dakar on 8 February 1943 and sailed to Philadelphia, where she remained for almost a year. Work began in May at the Philadelphia Naval Shipyard, but was complicated by the lack of blueprints and schematics. As well as this, the four surviving submarines used two different types of motor – an issue which caused problems for the American engineers. However, they were impressed by the modern fabrication of the nearly twenty year old boats. Alterations to Archimède were completed on 19 February 1944, and she was replaced in the shipyard by Le Glorieux until July, then Le Centaure from 2 June to 18 December and finally Casabianca from 2 August 1944 to 30 March 1945. The last two refits were less through than the first. Argo was deemed in too poor condition for a complete overhaul, and was transferred for use as a training boat for American submariners.

After returning from the United States, Archimède carried out surveillance missions and intelligence operations between March and August 1944. In April and June the boat landed and embarked several assets on the Spanish coast. On 12 May she was mistaken for a German U-boat and was attacked by three British aircraft. Archimède escaped after submerging 40 metres (130 ft). During the night of 13 and 14 July Archimède was spotted by a Wassermann radar off Cape Dramont and chased by three anti-submarine patrol boats for three hours. On 16 July Archimède located a small German convoy and fired four torpedoes against an aviso which was saved by its draught, which was less than the running depth of the French mechanically launched torpedoes. On 10 August the submarines left the French coast in anticipation of Operation Dragoon. By now the submarine war in the Mediterranean was largely over. By the time the French submarines were operating there German traffic had drastically reduced, and there were few targets for them.

After the return of Casabianca and Argo to the Mediterranean during the spring of 1945, the five Redoutable-class submarines passed the remainder of the war carrying out training exercises at Oran, while awaiting a transfer to the Pacific. The surrender of Japan on 2 September 1945 meant this never took place. Of the twenty-nine submarines active in 1939, twenty-four had been sunk or scuttled during the war. For their service Casabianca received the Resistance Medal with rosette and the fourragère of the Legion of Honour, while Le Glorieux received the Resistance Medal.

=== Post-war ===
Pégase was disarmed in Saigon by the Japanese on 1 January 1944, then scuttled on 9 March 1945. The boat was refloated in September; however, she was put up for disposal in 1950 without ever having entered service again. The following year she was beached on the Bassac sandbank in the Mekong Delta to serve as a seamark. By now obsolete, Argo was disarmed in April 1946.

The four remaining Redoutable-class submarines served as training vessels for new submarine crews, and for destroyers exercising underwater detection. Casabianca and Le Centaure carried out a cruise along the African coast and returned to Brest in January 1947. The scheduled large refitting for the two submarines was cancelled in June and were both placed in special reserve on 1 December 1947, before being disarmed; Casabianca on 12 February 1952 and Le Centaure on 19 June.

Archimède and Le Glorieux spent six months being refitted at Cherbourg from January 1946. Their equipment was inspected, and then repaired or replaced. Following their trials, they were based at Brest in January 1947, then carried out a four-month cruise off Africa in company with U-2518, a former German Type XXI submarine transferred to the French Navy in order to assess her capabilities. From 1947 to 1949 the two Redoutable-class submarines conducted training exercises at Brest, then at Toulon. Archimède was placed in special reserve on 31 August 1949, then disarmed on 19 February 1952. Le Glorieux was used for the filming of Casabianca in 1949, and was then placed in reserve. The last Redoutable-class submarine was disarmed on 27 October 1952.

The Redoutable-class submarines were replaced in the French Navy by German U-boats, such as U-2518, which became Roland Morillot, or British S-class submarines. The first submarines developed in France after the Second World War were the Narval class, which entered service in 1957. The four Redoutable-class submarines had been scrapped by 1956. In 1953, the conning tower of Casabianca was installed as a commemorative monument in the courtyard palace of the former governors of Bastia. The monument became increasingly dilapidated, and an identical replica was forged in 2002 and placed in the Saint-Nicolas Square in Bastia in October 2003.

== List of Redoutable-class submarines ==
Name	Pennant number	Ordered	Launched	Commissioned	Fate
Redoutable	Q136	1924	24 February 1928	10 July 1931	Scuttled at Toulon on 27 November 1942, refloated, then sunk in an air raid on 11 March 1944
Vengeur	Q137	1924	1 September 1928	18 December 1931	Scuttled at Toulon on 27 November 1942
Pascal	Q138	1925	19 July 1928	10 September 1931	Scuttled at Toulon on 27 November 1942, refloated, then sunk in an air raid on 11 March 1944
Pasteur	Q139	1925	19 August 1928	1 September 1932	Scuttled at Brest on 18 June 1940
Henri Poincaré	Q140	1925	10 April 1929	23 December 1931	Scuttled at Toulon on 27 November 1942. Refloated and scrapped at La Spezia on 9 September 1943
Poncelet	Q141	1925	10 April 1929	1 September 1932	Scuttled after being damaged by HMS Milford on 7 November 1940 off Gabon during the Battle of Gabon
Archimède	Q142	1925	6 September 1930	22 December 1932	Dismantled 19 February 1952
Fresnel	Q143	1925	8 June 1929	22 February 1932	Scuttled at Toulon on 27 November 1942. Refloated by the Italians on 28 January 1943. Sunk in an air raid on 11 March 1944 along with Redoutable and Pascal
Monge	Q144	1925	25 June 1929	19 June 1932	Sunk 8 May 1942 during the Battle of Madagascar
Achille	Q147	1926	28 May 1930	29 June 1933	Scuttled at Brest on 18 June 1940
Ajax	Q148	1926	28 May 1930	1 February 1934	Damaged by the destroyer HMS Fortune, scuttled after the evacuation of the crew during the Battle of Dakar on 24 September 1940
Actéon	Q149	1926	10 April 1929	18 December 1931	Sunk off Oran by the destroyer HMS Westcott on 8 November 1942 at 21:11.
Achéron	Q150	1926	6 August 1929	22 February 1932	Scuttled at Toulon on 27 November 1942. Refloated in July and sunk in an air raid on 24 November 1943
Argo	Q151	1926	11 April 1929	12 February 1933	Dismantled 26 April 1946
Prométhée	Q153	1927	23 October 1930	—	Sunk accidentally on 7 July 1932 during trials
Persée	Q154	1927	23 May 1931	10 June 1934	Sunk during the Battle of Dakar on 23 September 1940
Protée	Q155	1927	31 July 1930	1 November 1932	Sunk by a mine on 20 December 1943 off Cassis
Pégase	Q156	1927	28 June 1930	19 June 1932	Decommissioned 1 January 1944 in Saigon, scuttled on 9 March 1945
Phénix	Q157	1927	12 April 1930	21 October 1932	Sank accidentally on 15 June 1939 off French Indochina
L'Espoir	Q167	1929	18 July 1931	1 February 1934	Scuttled at Toulon on 27 November 1942
Le Glorieux	Q168	1929	29 November 1932	1 June 1934	Dismantled 27 October 1952
Le Centaure	Q169	1929	14 October 1932	1 January 1935	Dismantled 19 June 1952
Le Héros	Q170	1929	14 October 1932	12 September 1934	Sunk on 7 May 1942 during the Battle of Madagascar
Le Conquérant	Q171	1929	26 June 1934	7 September 1936	Sunk on 13 November 1942 off Río de Oro during the Naval Battle of Casablanca
Le Tonnant	Q172	1929	15 December 1934	1 June 1937	Scuttled off Cádiz, Spain, on 15 November 1942 during the Naval Battle of Casablanca
Agosta	Q178	1930	30 April 1934	1 February 1937	Scuttled at Brest on 18 June 1940
Bévéziers	Q179	1930	14 October 1935	4 June 1937	Sunk on 5 May 1942 during the Battle of Madagascar
Ouessant	Q180	1930	30 November 1936	1 January 1939	Scuttled at Brest on 18 June 1940
Sidi Ferruch	Q181	1930	9 July 1937	1 January 1939	Sunk 11 November 1942 off French Morocco during the Naval Battle of Casablanca
Sfax	Q182	1930	6 December 1934	7 September 1936	Torpedoed by the German U-boat U-37 on 19 December 1940
Casabianca	Q183	1930	2 February 1935	1 January 1937	Dismantled on 12 February 1952

== Successes ==
Date	Submarine	Target	Remarks
28 September 1939	Poncelet	Chemnitz (5,522 tons)	Merchant ship captured
25 September 1940	Bévéziers	HMS Resolution	British battleship damaged
17 November 1941	Le Héros	Thode Fagelund (5,750 tons)	Norwegian merchant ship sunk in the South Atlantic
22 December 1943	Casabianca	UJ-6076	German submarine chaser sunk off Toulon
28 December 1943	Casabianca	Ghisone (6,168 tons)	Merchant ship damaged

== See also ==
- Georges Cabanier

== Sources ==
- Aboulker, Axel (2010). Marines Éditions (ed.). Le Sous-marin Archimède. Rennes. p. 103. SBN 978-2357430587.
- Huan, Claude (2004). Les Sous-marins français 1918–1945. Rennes: Marines Éditions.
- Picard, Claude (2006). Les Sous-marins de 1500 tonnes. Rennes: Marines Éditions.
