= French submarine Redoutable (1928) =

Redoutable
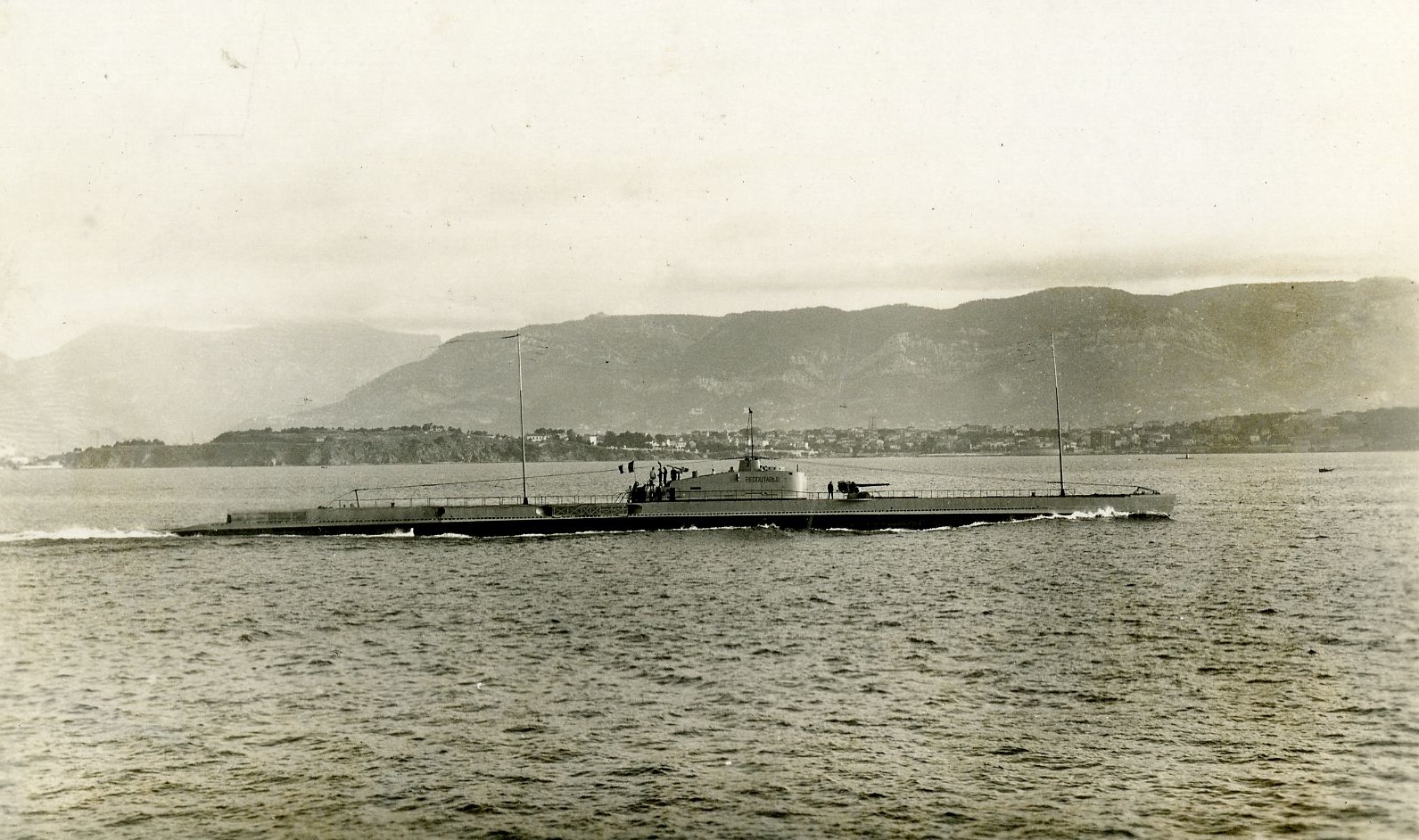
- Redoutable under way in Toulon

History

France
- Operator: French Navy
- Builder: Arsenal de Cherbourg
- Laid down: 1 July 1925
- Launched: 24 February 1928
- Commissioned: 10 July 1931
- Fate: Scuttled at Toulon on 27 November 1942 to prevent her capture by the Germans. Refloated by the Italians in 1943. Sunk 11 March 1944 by Allied aircraft.

General characteristics
- Class & type: Redoutable-class submarine
- Displacement: 1572 tonnes (surfaced); 2082 tonnes (submerged)
- Length: 92.30 m (302.8 ft)
- Beam: 8.10 m (26.6 ft)
- Propulsion: 2 × diesels, of 6,000 hp; 2 × electric engines of 2,250 hp
- Speed: 17.5 knots (32.4 km/h; 20.1 mph) (surfaced); 10 knots (submerged)
- Range: 14,000 nautical miles (26,000 km) at 7 knots (13 km/h; 8.1 mph), 10,000 nautical miles (20,000 km) at 10 knots (19 km/h; 12 mph); 4,000 nautical miles (7,000 km) at 17 knots (31 km/h; 20 mph); 100 nautical miles (190 km) at 5 knots (submerged)
- Test depth: 80 metres
- Complement: 5 officers (6 in operations); 66 men
- Armament: 11 torpedo tubes; 1 × 100 mm gun; 1 × 13.2 mm machine gun

Redoutable was the lead ship of the Redoutable-class submarines of the French Navy launched in 1928 at Cherbourg, France. It participated in the Second World War, first on the side of the Allies from 1939 to 1940, then on the side of the Axis for the rest of the war. She was scuttled by the French on 27 November 1942 to prevent her capture by the Germans during their advance on Toulon, but was then refloated by the Italians in 1943. On 11 March 1944 she was sunk by bombs from Allied aircraft.

== Development ==
=== Context ===
The Washington Naval Treaty of 1922 sought to prevent a future naval arms race by imposing limits on the number and size of certain types of warships that each great power could possess. France sought to expand its submarine forces – which were not limited by the treaty – as an essential tool to defend its coastline and empire. The 1100-ton Requin-class submarines, designed in 1922, was the initial attempt to meet these requirements; however, the speed of the submarines was notably insufficient and the design overall was considered inferior to the last German submarines launched in 1918.

The design for the Requin class's successor was commissioned from general engineer of maritime engineering Léon Roquebert. Roquebert was tasked with creating a "grand cruiser" type of submarine, with the role of carrying out surveillance of an adversary's bases, destroying their communications by attacking their ships, while protecting French colonies. They were operate with a surface squadron and provide clearance of enemy vessels for it.

Construction of the Type I project submarines, starting with Redoutable, was approved by the superior council of the navy on 1 July 1924. The building programme was expanded the following year with the Type II submarines.

=== Characteristics ===
92.3 m (302 ft 10 in) long, with a beam of 8.2 m (26 ft 11 in) and a draught of 4.9 m (16 ft 1 in), Redoutable could dive up to 80 m (260 ft). The submarine had a surfaced displacement of 1,572 tonnes (1,547 long tons) and a submerged displacement of 2,082 tonnes (2,049 long tons). Propulsion while surfaced was provided by two 6,000 hp (4,474 kW) diesel motors built by the Swiss manufacturer Sulzer. The submarines' electrical propulsion allowed it to attain speeds of 10 knots (19 km/h; 12 mph) while submerged. Designated as "grand cruise submarines" (French: « sous-marins de grande croisière »), their surfaced range was 10,000 nautical miles (20,000 km) at 10 knots (20 km/h), and 14,000 nautical miles (30,000 km) at 7 knots (10 km/h), with a submerged range of 100 nautical miles (0 km) at 5 knots (10 km/h). Radio communication was through wireless antenna.

Development plan of Redoutable

Redoutable had significant firepower. She was equipped with eleven torpedo tubes: four 550 mm (22 in) tubes in fixed positions in the bow, a orientable platform for three 550 mm tubes behind the conning tower, and another orientable platform on the stern composed of two 550 mm and two 400 mm (16 in) tubes. The 550 mm torpedoes were intended for use against large ships, with the 400 mm torpedoes for smaller boats. Torpedoes were propelled by compressed air at a speed of 44 knots (80 km/h), exploding on impact. Torpedoes left a trail on the surface, which allowed the target to see and avoid the torpedo, as well as trace the torpedo back to its origin. The submarines were also fitted with a 100 mm (4 in) deck gun, mounted in front of the conning tower and from 1929, dual anti-aerial 13.2 mm (0.52 in) machine guns.

Another view of Redoutable's profile

Redoutable had a quick diving speed, submerging in between 30 and 40 seconds. She had a reputation of handling well while at sea, both at the surface and while diving. Her motors were relatively noisy, as was auxiliary propulsion while submerged, and this constituted the principal criticism of that submarine, despite their reliability. Their speed and powerful armament was balanced against their ability to detect targets, which was essentially by visual sight. She was equipped with three periscopes – an attack periscope, a surveillance periscope, and an auxiliary periscope – and a hydrophone for passive sonar.

== History ==
=== Construction ===
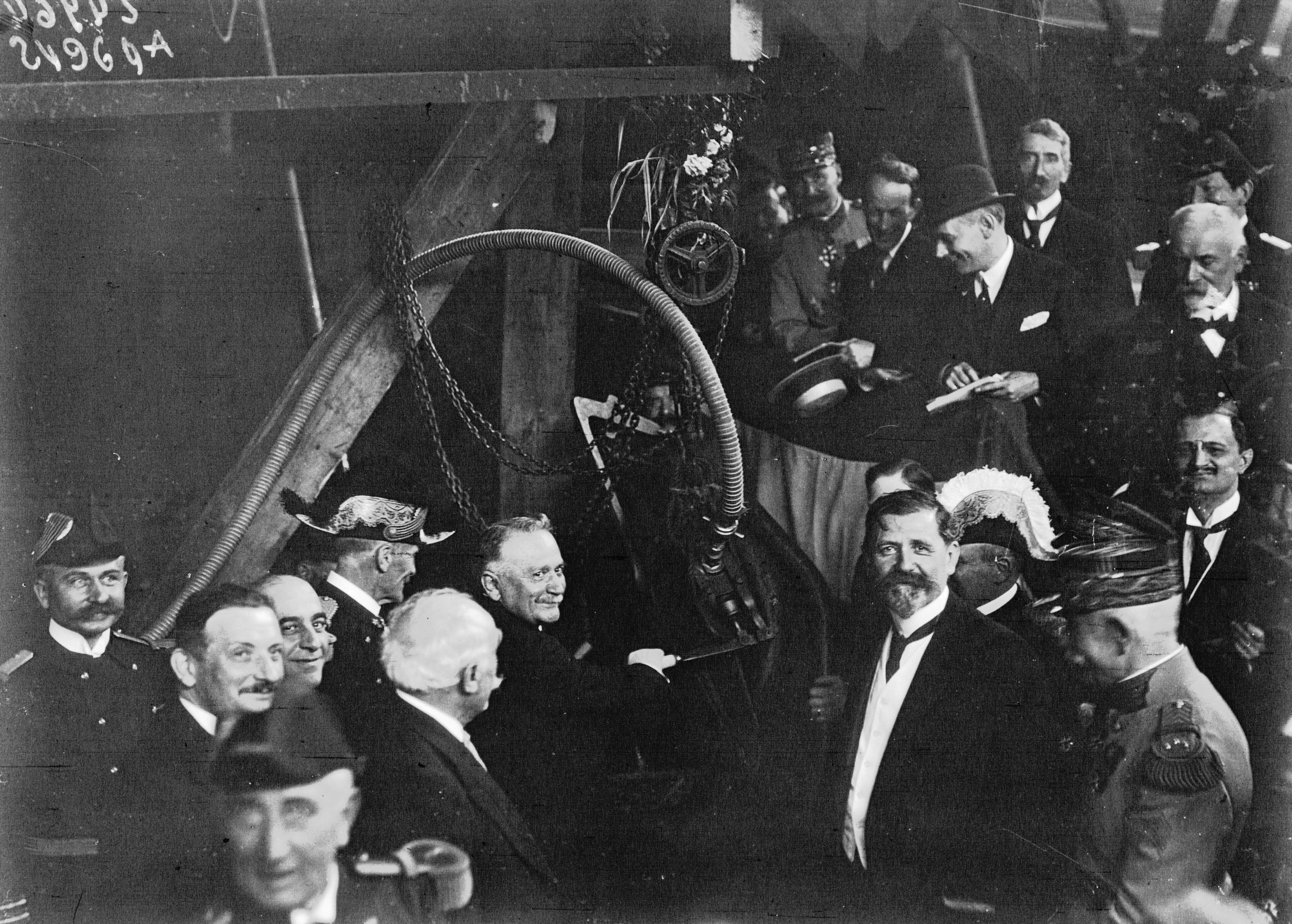
French President Gaston Doumergue lays the first rivet of Redoutable on 17 July 1925 at Cherbourg, in the presence of military and civilian personnel.

Redoutable was the first of 31 Redoutable-class submarines, also designated as the 1500 ton boats because of their displacement. The class entered service between 1931 and 1939.

Ordered in 1924, Redoutable was laid down on 1 July 1925 at the Arsenal de Cherbourg. She was launched on 24 February 1928 and was commissioned 10 July 1931. In 1932, she encountered problems with her diving systems and returned to Cherbourg for repairs.

=== Second World War ===
The scuttling of the French fleet at Toulon. Redoutable is on the right.

At the start of World War II, she was assigned to the seventh submarine division, based at Cherbourg, along with Vengeur. From 12 October to 2 November 1939, Redoutable carried out a surveillance mission to the Azores, where a part of the German commercial fleet, suspected of supplying German U-boats in fuel, was located. On the night of November 1 she encountered a cargo ship that was sailing all lights off. As the cargo refused to stop in accordance with the submarine's summons, the submarine fired warning shots with its 100 mm cannon, to which the cargo responded by further firing at the submarine. At that moment, Redoutable captured a message from the British freighter Egba who reported being attacked by a U-boat; The French submarine, understanding that she was attacking an ally, ceased fire and withdrew. In December 1939, he was sent to search for the German supply ship Altmark (10 000 barrels) in the centre of the Atlantic with Fresnel, Heron and Héros.

In June 1940, she was patrolling along the Tunisian coast to prevent a possible Italian landing. She was located in Bizerte when the armistice was signed on 25 June and was placed on guard in Toulon.

On 9 November 1942, the day after the Allied landing in North Africa, Redoutable was allowed to rearm. It was not completed when the Germans entered Toulon on 27 November and the submarine scuttled with the French fleet. The ship was refloated on 16 May 1943 to be repaired by the Italians. It was finally sunk by a bombardment on 11 March 1944 with the Pascal and Fresnel.

== Sources ==
- Aboulker, Axel (2010). Marines Éditions (ed.). Le Sous-marin Archimède. Rennes. ISBN 978-2357430587.
- Huan, Claude (2004). Les Sous-marins français 1918-1945. Rennes: Marines Éditions. ISBN 9782915379075.
- Picard, Claude (2006). Les Sous-marins de 1 500 tonnes. Rennes: Marines Éditions. ISBN 2-915379-55-6.
