= French submarine Ajax =

Ajax
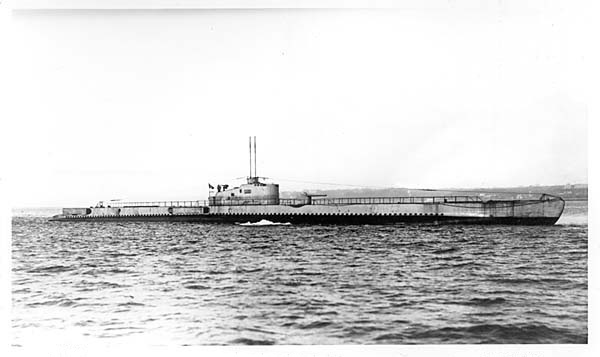
- Ajax in 1930

History

France
- Name: Ajax
- Namesake: Ajax the Great, a hero in Greek mythology
- Operator: French Navy
- Builder: Brest Arsenal
- Laid down: 1 September 1928
- Launched: 28 May 1930
- Commissioned: 1 February 1934
- Fate: Scuttled on 24 September 1940

General characteristics
- Class & type: Redoutable-class submarine
- Displacement: 1,572 tonnes (surfaced); 2,092 tonnes (submerged)
- Length: 92.30 m (302 ft 10 in)
- Beam: 8.10 m (26 ft 7 in)
- Propulsion: 2 × diesels, of 6,000 hp (4,500 kW); 2 × electric engines of 2,250 hp (1,680 kW)
- Speed: 17.5 knots (32.4 km/h; 20.1 mph) (surfaced); 10 knots (19 km/h; 12 mph) (submerged)
- Range: 14,000 nmi (26,000 km; 16,000 mi) at 7 knots (13 km/h; 8.1 mph)
- Test depth: 80 m (260 ft)
- Complement: 5 officers (6 in operations); 66 men
- Armament: 11 torpedo tubes; 1 × 100 mm (3.9 in) gun; 1 × 13.2 mm (0.52 in) machine gun

Ajax was a Redoutable-class submarine of the French Navy launched in 1930 at Brest, France. It participated in the Second World War, first on the side of the Allies from 1939 to 1940 then on the side of the Axis for the rest of the war. On 23 September 1940, during the Battle of Dakar she was badly damaged by depth charges from HMS Fortune and was then scuttled.

== Construction and characteristics ==
Profile of Casbianca, sister ship of Ajax

Ajax was ordered as part of the French fleet expansion program from in 1926. The project was an improvement of the first post-war French submarines - the Requin type. The design was designed to be especially faster and more maneuverable over the previous class, as well as a larger range and larger weapons storing capacities.

Ajax was one of 31 Redoutable-class submarines, also designated as the 1500 ton boats because of their displacement. The class entered service between 1931 and 1939.

92.3 m (302 ft 10 in) long, with a beam of 8.2 m (26 ft 11 in) and a draught of 4.9 m (16 ft 1 in), she could dive up to 80 m (260 ft). Redoutable-class submarines had a surfaced displacement of 1,572 tonnes (1,547 long tons) and a submerged displacement of 2,082 tonnes (2,049 long tons). Propulsion while surfaced was provided by two 6,000 hp (4,500 kW) diesel motors, with a maximum speed of 18.6 knots (34.4 km/h; 21.4 mph). The submarines' electrical propulsion allowed them to attain speeds of 10 knots (19 km/h; 12 mph) while submerged. Designated as "large cruiser submarines" (French: « sous-marins de grande croisière »), their surfaced range was 10,000 nautical miles (19,000 km; 12,000 mi) at 10 knots (19 km/h; 12 mph), and 14,000 nautical miles (26,000 km; 16,000 mi) at 7 knots (13 km/h; 8.1 mph), with a submerged range of 100 nautical miles (190 km; 120 mi) at 5 knots (9.3 km/h; 5.8 mph).

Ordered in 1927, Ajax was laid down on 1 September 1928 at the Brest Arsenal. She was launched on 28 May 1930; and commissioned on 1 February 1934.

== Second World War ==
At the start of World War II, Ajax was assigned to the 6th Submarine Division, based in Brest, along with her sister ships Persée, Archimède and Poncelet. In April 1940, with her sister ship Archimède, she escorted convoy HX 41 from Halifax to Britain. In front of the advancing German forces, she left Brest along 6:30 pm with thirteen other French submarines and one tanker. The force arrived at Casablanca on 23 June. After the attack on Mers-el-Kébir, she patrolled along the Moroccan coast.

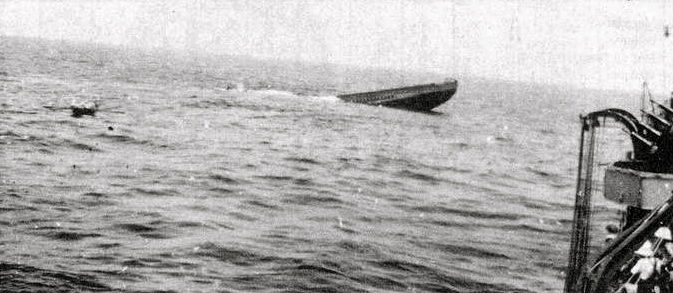
Ajax sinking after being scuttled by her crew. A lifeboat from HMS Fortune picks up survivors

On 23 September 1940, she arrived at Dakar with Persée and Poncelet. On the 23rd, she sighted the British force preparing to attack Dakar. She turned to attack it along with Persée, who was quickly sunk by British depth charges. Ajax itself was forced to crash-dive and was then depth charged, but sustained only minor damage. The next day, she attempted to torpedo the battleships HMS Barham and HMS Resolution but was detected on sonar and critically damaged by depth charges from the destroyer Fortune. She was forced to surface and scuttled by its crew, most of which was then rescued by lifeboats from Fortune.
