= French destroyer Siroco (1939) =

French Le Hardi-class destroyer

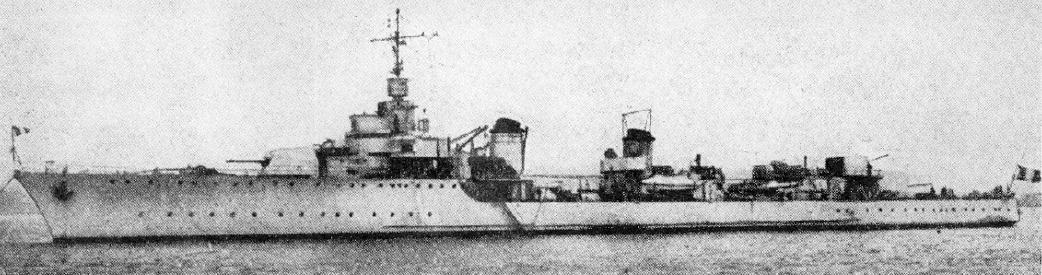
- Sister ship Le Hardi at anchor

History

France
- Name: Le Corsaire
- Namesake: Corsair
- Ordered: 24 May 1937
- Builder: Forges et Chantiers de la Méditerranée, La Seyne-sur-Mer
- Laid down: 31 March 1937
- Launched: 14 November 1939
- In service: 1 July 1941
- Renamed: Siroco, 1 April 1941
- Captured: 27 November 1942
- Fate: Scuttled, 27 November 1942

General characteristics
- Class & type: Le Hardi-class destroyer
- Displacement: 1,800 t (1,772 long tons) (standard ); 2,577 t (2,536 long tons) (deep load)
- Length: 117.2 m (384 ft 6 in) (o/a)
- Beam: 11.1 m (36 ft 5 in)
- Draft: 3.8 m (12 ft 6 in)
- Installed power: 4 forced-circulation boilers; 58,000 PS (42,659 kW; 57,207 shp)
- Propulsion: 2 × shafts; 2 × geared steam turbines
- Speed: 37 knots (69 km/h; 43 mph)
- Range: 3,100 nautical miles (5,700 km; 3,600 mi) at 10 knots (19 km/h; 12 mph)
- Complement: 187 officers and enlisted men
- Armament: 3 × twin 130 mm (5.1 in) guns; 1 × twin 37 mm (1.5 in) AA guns; 2 × twin 13.2 mm (0.5 in) anti-aircraft machineguns; 1 × triple + 2 × twin 550 mm (21.7 in) torpedo tubes; 2 × chutes; 12 × depth charges

Siroco was one of a dozen Le Hardi-class destroyers built for the French Navy during the late 1930s under the name Le Corsaire. Although she was still under construction during the Battle of France, the ship sailed to French Algeria to avoid capture by the Germans. She was renamed Siroco in early 1941 while still under construction and was completed later that year and immediately placed in reserve. The destroyer was one of the ships scuttled to prevent their capture in November 1942 when the Germans occupied Vichy France. Siroco was salvaged by the Regia Marina (Royal Italian Navy) and towed to Italy in 1943. Captured by the Germans after the Italian armistice in September, the ship was scuttled by the Germans in late 1944 and later scrapped.

== Design and description ==
The Le Hardi class was designed to escort the fast battleships of the Dunkerque class and to counter the large destroyers of the Italian Navigatori and Japanese Fubuki classes. The ships had an overall length of 117.2 meters (384 ft 6 in), a beam of 11.1 meters (36 ft 5 in), and a draft of 3.8 meters (12 ft 6 in). The ships displaced 1,800 metric tons (1,772 long tons) at standard and 2,577 t (2,536 long tons) at deep load. They were powered by two geared steam turbines, each driving one propeller shaft, using steam provided by four Sural-Penhöet forced-circulation boilers. The turbines were designed to produce 58,000 metric horsepower (42,659 kW; 57,207 shp), which was intended to give the ships a maximum speed of 37 knots (69 km/h; 43 mph). Le Hardi, the only ship of the class to run sea trials, comfortably exceeded that speed during her trials on 6 November 1939, reaching a maximum speed of 39.1 knots (72.4 km/h; 45.0 mph) from 60,450 metric horsepower (44,461 kW; 59,623 shp). The ships carried 470 metric tons (463 long tons) of fuel oil which gave them a range of 3,100 nautical miles (5,700 km; 3,600 mi) at 10 knots (19 km/h; 12 mph). The crew consisted of 10 officers and 177 enlisted men.

The main armament of the Le Hardi-class ships consisted of six Canon de 130 mm (5.1 in) Modèle 1932 guns in three twin mounts, one forward and a superfiring pair aft of the superstructure. Their anti-aircraft (AA) armament consisted of one twin mount for Canon de 37 mm (1.5 in) Modèle 1925 guns on the aft superstructure and two twin Hotchkiss Mitrailleuse de 13.2 mm (0.52 in) CA Modèle 1929 AA machine gun mounts on the roof of the shell hoists for the forward 130 mm mount. The ships carried one triple and two twin sets of 550-millimeter (21.7 in) torpedo tubes; the aft mount could traverse to both sides, but the forward mounts were positioned one on each broadside. A pair of chutes were built into the stern that housed a dozen 200-kilogram (440 lb) depth charges.

== Construction and career ==
Ordered on 24 May 1937, Le Corsaire was built by Forges et Chantiers de la Méditerranée at their shipyard in La Seyne-sur-Mer. She was laid down on 31 March 1938 and launched on 14 November 1939. The ship was 82% complete and without her guns when the French surrendered on 22 June. Nonetheless, Le Corsaire joined a convoy bound for Oran, French Algeria, that day. After the British attacked French Navy ships in nearby Mers-el-Kébir on 3 July, Le Corsaire joined up with her sister ship Casque and they reached Toulon on 7 July.

On 1 April 1941, Le Corsaire was renamed Siroco to commemorate the destroyer of that name that was sunk during the Dunkirk evacuation in 1940 and entered service on 1 July, although she was placed in reserve. When the Germans occupied Vichy France on 27 November 1942, Sciroco was scuttled by her crew. The Italians refloated her on 16 April 1943 and redesignated her as FR32. The ship was towed to Genoa, Italy, on 10 June where she was captured by the Germans in September; she was scuttled there on 20 October 1944 as a blockship and later scrapped.
