= French destroyer Fleuret (1938) =

French Le Hardi-class destroyer

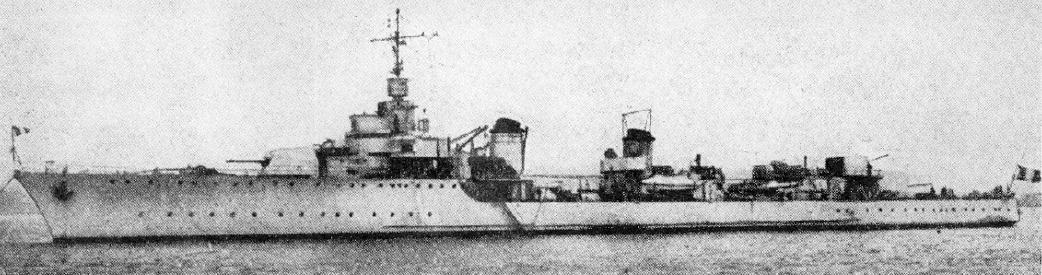
- Sister ship Le Hardi at anchor

History

France
- Name: Fleuret
- Namesake: Rapier
- Builder: Forges et Chantiers de la Méditerranée, La Seyne-sur-Mer
- Laid down: 18 August 1936
- Launched: 28 July 1938
- Commissioned: 10 May 1940
- Renamed: Foudroyant, 1 April 1941
- Captured: 27 November 1942
- Fate: Scuttled, 27 November 1942

General characteristics
- Class & type: Le Hardi-class destroyer
- Displacement: 1,800 t (1,772 long tons) (standard ); 2,577 t (2,536 long tons) (deep load)
- Length: 117.2 m (384 ft 6 in) (o/a)
- Beam: 11.1 m (36 ft 5 in)
- Draft: 3.8 m (12 ft 6 in)
- Installed power: 4 forced-circulation boilers; 58,000 PS (42,659 kW; 57,207 shp)
- Propulsion: 2 × shafts; 2 × geared steam turbines
- Speed: 37 knots (69 km/h; 43 mph)
- Range: 3,100 nautical miles (5,700 km; 3,600 mi) at 10 knots (19 km/h; 12 mph)
- Complement: 187 officers and enlisted men
- Armament: 3 × twin 130 mm (5.1 in) guns; 1 × twin 37 mm (1.5 in) AA guns; 2 × twin 13.2 mm (0.52 in) AA machine guns; 1 × triple and 2 × twin 550 mm (21.7 in) torpedo tubes; 8 depth charges; 1 × chute

Fleuret was one of a dozen Le Hardi-class destroyers built for the Marine Nationale (French Navy) during the late 1930s. The ship was completed during the Battle of France in mid-1940 and her first mission was to help escort a battleship to Dakar, French West Africa, only days before the French signed an armistice with the Germans. After the British attack on Dakar in September, she was one of four destroyers ordered to attack British shipping, although there was only an inconclusive duel with a British destroyer. Fleuret helped to escort one of the battleships damaged by the British during their July attack on Mers-el-Kébir, French Algeria, back to France in November and was then reduced to reserve.

When the Germans occupied Vichy France after the Allies landed in French North Africa in November 1942 and tried to seize the French fleet, the destroyer was one of the ships scuttled to prevent their capture. She was salvaged by the Regia Marina (Royal Italian Navy) in 1943, but was scuttled again by the Germans as a blockship in mid-1944. The ship was refloated in 1951 and later scrapped.

== Design and description ==
The Le Hardi class was designed to escort the fast battleships of the Dunkerque class and to counter the large destroyers of the Italian Navigatori and Japanese Fubuki classes. The ships had an overall length of 117.2 meters (384 ft 6 in), a beam of 11.1 meters (36 ft 5 in), and a draft of 3.8 meters (12 ft 6 in). The ships displaced 1,800 metric tons (1,772 long tons) at standard and 2,577 t (2,536 long tons) at deep load. They were powered by two geared steam turbines, each driving one propeller shaft, using steam provided by four Sural-Penhöet forced-circulation boilers. The turbines were designed to produce 58,000 metric horsepower (42,659 kW; 57,207 shp), which was intended to give the ships a maximum speed of 37 knots (69 km/h; 43 mph). Le Hardi, the only ship of the class to run sea trials, comfortably exceeded that speed during her trials on 6 November 1939, reaching a maximum speed of 39.1 knots (72.4 km/h; 45.0 mph) from 60,450 metric horsepower (44,461 kW; 59,623 shp). The ships carried 470 metric tons (463 long tons) of fuel oil which gave them a range of 3,100 nautical miles (5,700 km; 3,600 mi) at 10 knots (19 km/h; 12 mph). The crew consisted of 10 officers and 177 enlisted men.

The main armament of the Le Hardi-class ships consisted of six Canon de 130 mm (5.1 in) Modèle 1932 guns in three twin-gun mounts, one forward and a superfiring pair aft of the superstructure. Their anti-aircraft armament consisted of one twin mount for 37 mm (1.5 in) Modèle 1925 guns and two twin mounts Hotchkiss 13.2 mm (0.52 in) Modèle 1929 anti-aircraft machine guns. The ships carried one triple and two twin sets of 550-millimeter (21.7 in) torpedo tubes, one pair on each broadside between the funnels as well as one triple mount aft of the rear funnel able to traverse to both sides. One depth charge chute was built into the stern that housed eight 200-kilogram (440 lb) depth charges. The other side of the stern was intended to be used for the handling gear for a "Ginocchio" anti-submarine torpedo, but this was removed before Fleuret was completed.

== Construction and career ==
Ordered on 31 December 1935, Fleuret was laid down by Forges et Chantiers de la Méditerranée at their shipyard in La Seyne-sur-Mer on 18 August 1936. She was launched on 28 July 1938, commissioned on 10 May 1940 and entered service on 11 June. The following day, the ship sailed from Toulon to Casablanca, French Morocco to help to escort the battleship Richelieu from Casablanca to Dakar before the French armistice with the Axis powers. Together with the large destroyer Milan, Fleuret escorted three passenger ships to Casablanca, 17–23 August. Later that month, she began escorting convoys from Casablanca to various ports in Occupied France. After the British attack on Dakar in September, Fleuret and her sister Épée, together with the destroyers Fougueux and Frondeur were ordered to attack British shipping in the Strait of Gibraltar on 25 September in retaliation. They encountered only an unidentified British destroyer; Fleuret's fire-control director malfunctioned and she was unable to engage her opponent at all. The ships continued onward to Oran, French Algeria, and Fleuret later returned to Casablanca on 7 October.

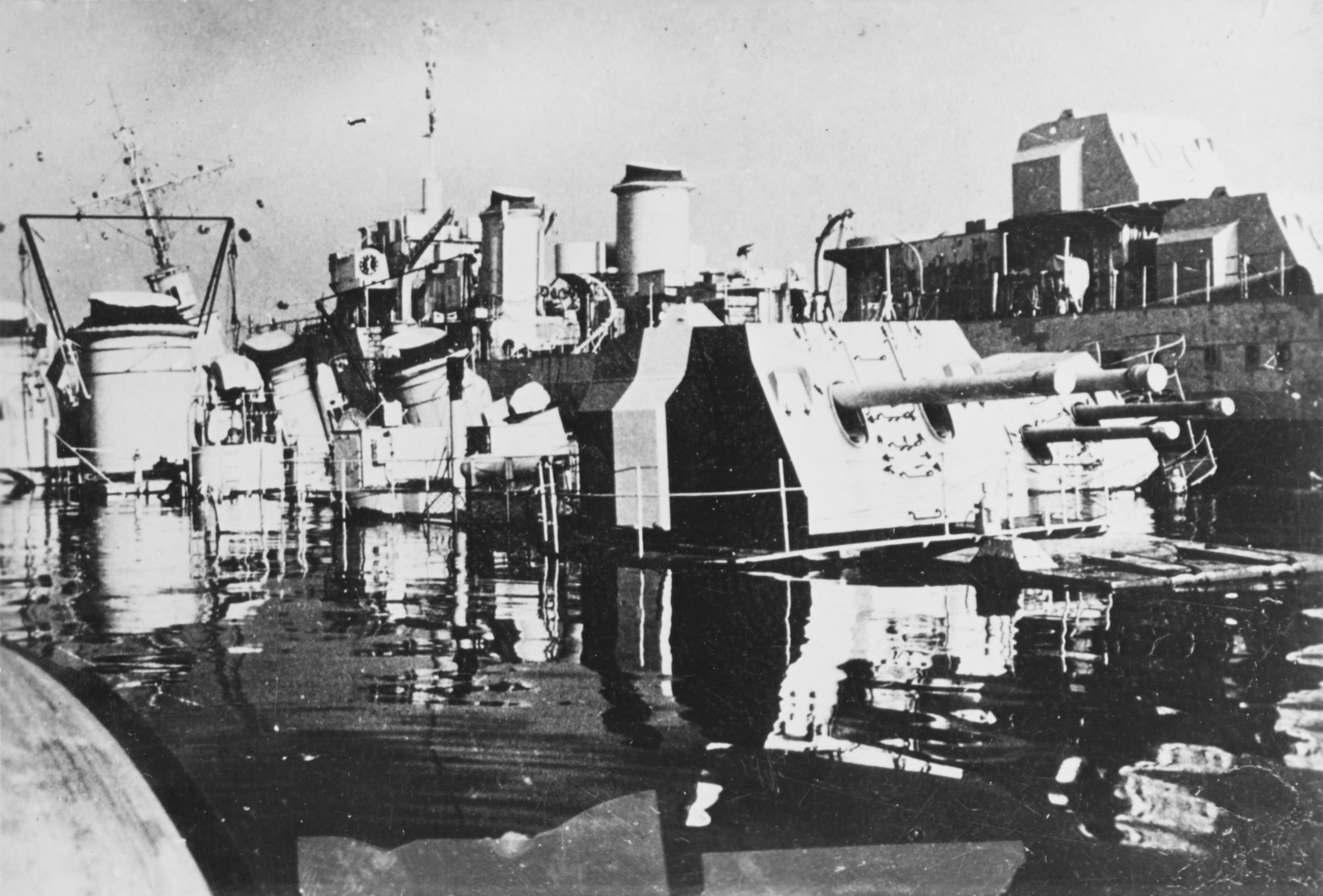
Scuttled at Toulon, from left: Trombe, Foudroyant, Le Hardi, and Bison

The following months saw five of the Le Hardi-class ships ordered to Oran to escort the battleship Provence, which had been damaged during the attack on Mers-el-Kébir, to Toulon; Fleuret arrived there on 15 October. Departing on 6 November, they arrived at Toulon two days later at which time the ship was reduced to reserve. On 1 April 1941, Fleuret was renamed Foudroyant to commemorate the destroyer of that name that had been sunk during the Dunkirk evacuation in 1940. When the Germans attempted to capture the French ships in Toulon intact on 27 November 1942, Foudroyant, still in reserve, was scuttled by her crew. An Italian salvage syndicate refloated her on 20 May 1943 and she was redesignated as FR36 by the Regia Marina (Royal Italian Navy). The ship was damaged by a bomb during an Allied bombing raid on 7 March 1944 and was scuttled by the Germans as a blockship in the main channel on 17 August. She was finally refloated in 1951 and scrapped in 1957.
