= French destroyer Bison =

At least two ships of the French Navy have been named Bison:

- French destroyer Bison (1928), a Guépard-class destroyer launched in 1928 and sunk in 1940.
- French destroyer Bison (1941), a Le Hardi-class destroyer launched in 1939 as Le Flibustier and renamed Bison in 1941. Seized by Italy in 1942 and renamed FR35. Subsequently seized by Germany and sunk in 1944.
