= French destroyer Casque (1938) =

French Le Hardi-class destroyer

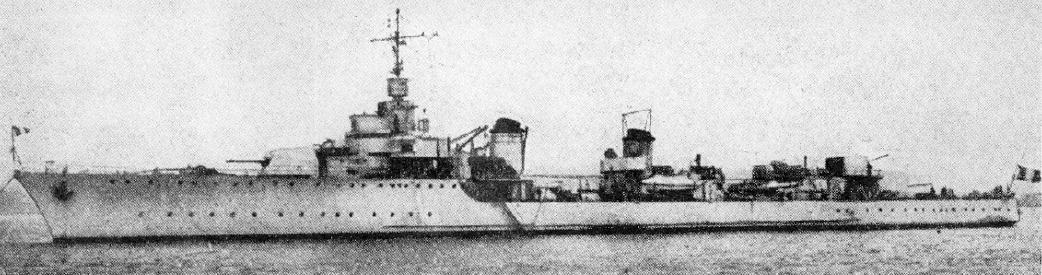
- Sister ship Le Hardi at anchor

History

France
- Name: Casque
- Namesake: Helmet
- Ordered: 4 May 1936
- Builder: Forges et Chantiers de la Méditerranée, La Seyne-sur-Mer
- Laid down: 30 November 1936
- Launched: 2 November 1938
- In service: 20 June 1940
- Captured: 27 November 1942
- Fate: Scuttled, 27 November 1942

General characteristics
- Class & type: Le Hardi-class destroyer
- Displacement: 1,800 t (1,772 long tons) (standard ); 2,577 t (2,536 long tons) (deep load)
- Length: 117.2 m (384 ft 6 in) (o/a)
- Beam: 11.1 m (36 ft 5 in)
- Draft: 3.8 m (12 ft 6 in)
- Installed power: 4 forced-circulation boilers; 58,000 PS (42,659 kW; 57,207 shp)
- Propulsion: 2 × shafts; 2 × geared steam turbines
- Speed: 37 knots (69 km/h; 43 mph)
- Range: 3,100 nautical miles (5,700 km; 3,600 mi) at 10 knots (19 km/h; 12 mph)
- Complement: 187 officers and enlisted men
- Armament: 3 × twin 130 mm (5.1 in) guns; 1 × twin 37 mm (1.5 in) AA guns; 2 × twin 13.2 mm (0.5 in) AA machine guns; 1 × triple + 2 × twin 550 mm (21.7 in) torpedo tubes; 2 × chutes; 12 × depth charges

The French destroyer Casque was one of a dozen Le Hardi-class destroyers built for the French Navy during the late 1930s. The ship was completed during the Battle of France in mid-1940 only days before the French signed an armistice with the Germans. When the Germans occupied Vichy France after the Allies landed in French North Africa in November 1942 and tried to seize the French fleet intact, the destroyer was one of the ships scuttled to prevent their capture. The Regia Marina (Royal Italian Navy) attempted to salvage her in 1943, but the effort was abandoned the following year. The ship was refloated in 1948 and scrapped.

== Design and description ==
The Le Hardi class was designed to escort the fast battleships of the Dunkerque class and to counter the large destroyers of the Italian Navigatori and Japanese Fubuki classes. The ships had an overall length of 117.2 meters (384 ft 6 in), a beam of 11.1 meters (36 ft 5 in), and a draft of 3.8 meters (12 ft 6 in). The ships displaced 1,800 metric tons (1,772 long tons) at standard and 2,577 t (2,536 long tons) at deep load. They were powered by two geared steam turbines, each driving one propeller shaft, using steam provided by four Sural-Penhöet forced-circulation boilers. The turbines were designed to produce 58,000 metric horsepower (42,659 kW; 57,207 shp), which was intended to give the ships a maximum speed of 37 knots (69 km/h; 43 mph). Le Hardi, the only ship of the class to run sea trials, comfortably exceeded that speed during her trials on 6 November 1939, reaching a maximum speed of 39.1 knots (72.4 km/h; 45.0 mph) from 60,450 metric horsepower (44,461 kW; 59,623 shp). The ships carried 470 metric tons (463 long tons) of fuel oil which gave them a range of 3,100 nautical miles (5,700 km; 3,600 mi) at 10 knots (19 km/h; 12 mph). The crew consisted of 10 officers and 177 enlisted men.

The main armament of the Le Hardi-class ships consisted of six Canon de 130 mm (5.1 in) Modèle 1932 guns in three twin mounts, one forward and a superfiring pair aft of the superstructure. Their anti-aircraft (AA) armament consisted of one twin mount for Canon de 37 mm (1.5 in) Modèle 1925 guns on the aft superstructure and two twin Hotchkiss 13.2 mm (0.5 in) AA machine gun mounts on the roof of the shell hoists for the forward 130 mm mount. The ships carried one triple and two twin sets of 550-millimeter (21.7 in) torpedo tubes; the aft mount could traverse to both sides, but the forward mounts were positioned one on each broadside. A pair of chutes were built into the stern that housed a dozen 200-kilogram (440 lb) depth charges.

=== Modifications ===
In late 1941 or early 1942, the twin Hotchkiss machine guns were repositioned on the quarterdeck and a pair of single mounts for 25 mm (1 in) Hotchkiss AA guns were installed in their place in front of the bridge. In addition a pair of single mounts for Browning 13.2-millimeter AA machine guns were added on platforms on the sides of the superfiring turret aft.

== Construction and career ==
Ordered on 4 May 1936, Casque was laid down by Forges et Chantiers de la Méditerranée at their shipyard in La Seyne-sur-Mer on 30 November 1936. She was launched on 2 November 1938 and entered service on 20 June 1940. That day the ship steamed for Oran, French Algeria. After the British attacked French Navy ships in nearby Mers-el-Kébir on 3 July, Casque joined the other destroyers in Oran in leaving that day for a safer port, but she had to return to Oran because she had damaged her propeller while getting underway. After repairs, the ship rendezvoused with her sister Le Corsaire and they reached Toulon on 7 July, at which time she was immediately placed in reserve. Amid high tensions with the United Kingdom, Casque and the destroyer Épée escorted the tanker Lot and the submarines L'Espoir, Monge, Pégase, and Vengeur through the Strait of Gibraltar during a voyage Lot and the submarines made from Oran to Casablanca between 16 and 18 October 1940.

Casque was assigned to the Forces de haute mer (High Seas Forces) on 1 May 1942, replacing Le Hardi in the 10th DT (division de torpilleurs), although she was not ready for service until 1 July. When the Germans attempted to capture the French ships in Toulon intact on 27 November 1942, Casque was scuttled by her crew. The Italians attempted to salvage her, but the effort was abandoned after the ship was damaged during the Allied bombing raid on 29 April 1944; she was finally refloated in 1948 and scrapped.
