= French destroyer Le Hardi =

French Navy's Le Hardi-class destroyer

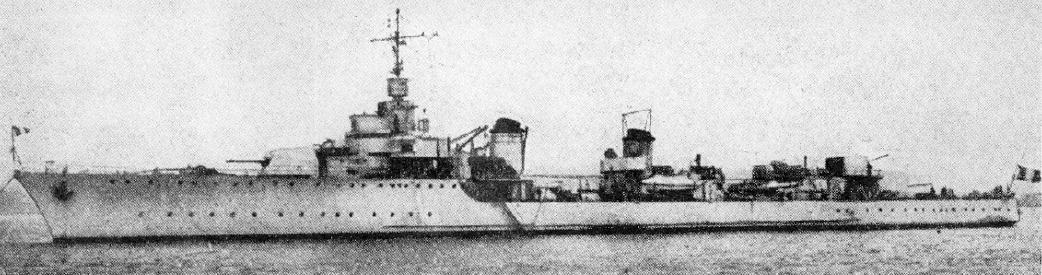
- Le Hardi at anchor

History

France
- Name: Le Hardi
- Namesake: "the bold one"
- Builder: Ateliers et Chantiers de la Loire, Nantes
- Laid down: 20 May 1936
- Launched: 4 May 1938
- Completed: 31 May 1940
- Commissioned: 1 December 1939
- In service: 2 June 1940
- Fate: Scuttled, 27 November 1942, raised by Italians, seized by Germans; Scuttled at Genoa, April 1945

General characteristics
- Class & type: Le Hardi-class destroyer
- Displacement: 1,800 t (1,772 long tons) (standard ); 2,577 t (2,536 long tons) (deep load)
- Length: 117.2 m (384 ft 6 in) (o/a)
- Beam: 11.1 m (36 ft 5 in)
- Draft: 3.8 m (12 ft 6 in)
- Installed power: 4 forced-circulation boilers; 58,000 PS (42,659 kW; 57,207 shp)
- Propulsion: 2 × shafts; 2 × geared steam turbines
- Speed: 37 knots (69 km/h; 43 mph)
- Range: 3,100 nautical miles (5,700 km; 3,600 mi) at 10 knots (19 km/h; 12 mph)
- Complement: 187 officers and enlisted men
- Armament: 3 × twin 130 mm (5.1 in) guns; 1 × twin 37 mm (1.5 in) AA guns; 2 × twin 13.2 mm (0.52 in) AA machine guns; 1 × triple and 2 × twin 550 mm (21.7 in) torpedo tubes; 8 depth charges; 1 × chute

Le Hardi ("the bold one") was the lead ship of her class of destroyers (torpilleur d'escadre) built for the Marine Nationale (French Navy) during the late 1930s. The ship was completed during the Battle of France in mid-1940 and her first mission was to help escort an incomplete battleship to French Morocco only days before the French signed an armistice with the Germans. She played a minor role in the Battle of Dakar in September, mostly laying smoke screens. Le Hardi helped to escort one of the battleships damaged by the British during their July attack on Mers-el-Kébir, French Algeria, back to France in November. She was reduced to reserve in mid-1942.

When the Germans occupied Vichy France after the Allies landed in French North Africa in November 1942 and tried to seize the French fleet, the destroyer was one of the ships scuttled to prevent their capture. She was salvaged by the Regia Marina (Royal Italian Navy) in 1943, but was captured by the Germans after the Italian armistice in September. Unrepaired, the ship was scuttled by them in 1945 in Italy and later scrapped.

== Design and description ==
The Le Hardi class was designed to escort the fast battleships of the Dunkerque class and to counter the large destroyers of the Italian Navigatori and Japanese Fubuki classes. The ships had an overall length of 117.2 meters (384 ft 6 in), a beam of 11.1 meters (36 ft 5 in), and a draft of 3.8 meters (12 ft 6 in). The ships displaced 1,800 metric tons (1,772 long tons) at standard and 2,577 t (2,536 long tons) at deep load. They were powered by two geared steam turbines, each driving one propeller shaft, using steam provided by four Sural-Penhöet forced-circulation boilers. The turbines were designed to produce 58,000 metric horsepower (42,659 kW; 57,207 shp), which was intended to give the ships a maximum speed of 37 knots (69 km/h; 43 mph). Le Hardi comfortably exceeded that speed during her sea trials on 6 November 1939, reaching a maximum speed of 39.1 knots (72.4 km/h; 45.0 mph) from 60,450 metric horsepower (44,461 kW; 59,623 shp). The ships carried 470 metric tons (463 long tons) of fuel oil which gave them a range of 3,100 nautical miles (5,700 km; 3,600 mi) at 10 knots (19 km/h; 12 mph). The crew consisted of 10 officers and 177 enlisted men.

The main armament of the Le Hardi-class ships consisted of six Canon de 130 mm (5.1 in) Modèle 1932 guns in three twin-gun mounts, one forward and a superfiring pair aft of the superstructure. Their anti-aircraft armament consisted of one twin mount for 37 mm (1.5 in) Modèle 1925 guns and two twin mounts Hotchkiss 13.2 mm (0.52 in) Modèle 1929 anti-aircraft machine guns. The ships carried one triple and two twin sets of 550 mm (21.7 in) torpedo tubes, one pair on each broadside between the funnels as well as one triple mount aft of the rear funnel able to traverse to both sides. One depth charge chute was built into the stern that housed eight 200-kilogram (440 lb) depth charges. The other side of the stern was intended to be used for the handling gear for a "Ginocchio" anti-submarine torpedo, but this was removed before Le Hardi was completed.

=== Modifications ===
In late 1941 the twin Hotchkiss machine guns were repositioned on the quarterdeck and a pair of single mounts for 25 mm (1 in) Hotchkiss anti-aircraft (AA) guns were installed in their place in front of the bridge. In addition a pair of single mounts for Browning 13.2-millimeter AA machine guns were added on platforms on the sides of the superfiring turret aft.

== Construction and career ==
Ordered on 12 November 1935, Le Hardi was laid down by Ateliers et Chantiers de la Loire at their shipyard in Nantes on 20 May 1936. She was launched on 4 May 1938, commissioned on 1 December 1939, and completed on 31 May 1940, entering service two days later. The ship escorted the passenger ship SS Ville d'Oran from La Pallice to Casablanca, French Morocco, and then steamed to Brest, France. On 19 June, Le Hardi, together with her sisters Épée and Mameluk, helped to escort the incomplete battleship Jean Bart from Saint-Nazaire to Casablanca, where they arrived three days later. On 28 July, Le Hardi and Épée sailed for Dakar, French West Africa. During the British attack on Dakar on 23–25 September, Le Hardi was tasked to make a smoke screen to protect the light cruisers Georges Leygues and Montcalm and fired 60 rounds at British ships. The destroyer departed Dakar for Casablanca on 30 September. The following months saw five of the Le Hardi-class ships ordered to Oran, French Algeria, to escort the battleship Provence that had been damaged during the attack on Mers-el-Kébir; Le Hardi arrived there on 25 October. Departing on 5 November, they arrived at Toulon three days later. All of the ships in the class were assigned to the 10th DT (division de torpilleurs) at this time, although only three were allowed to be in commission at any time in accordance with the rules imposed by the Italian and German Armistice Commissions.

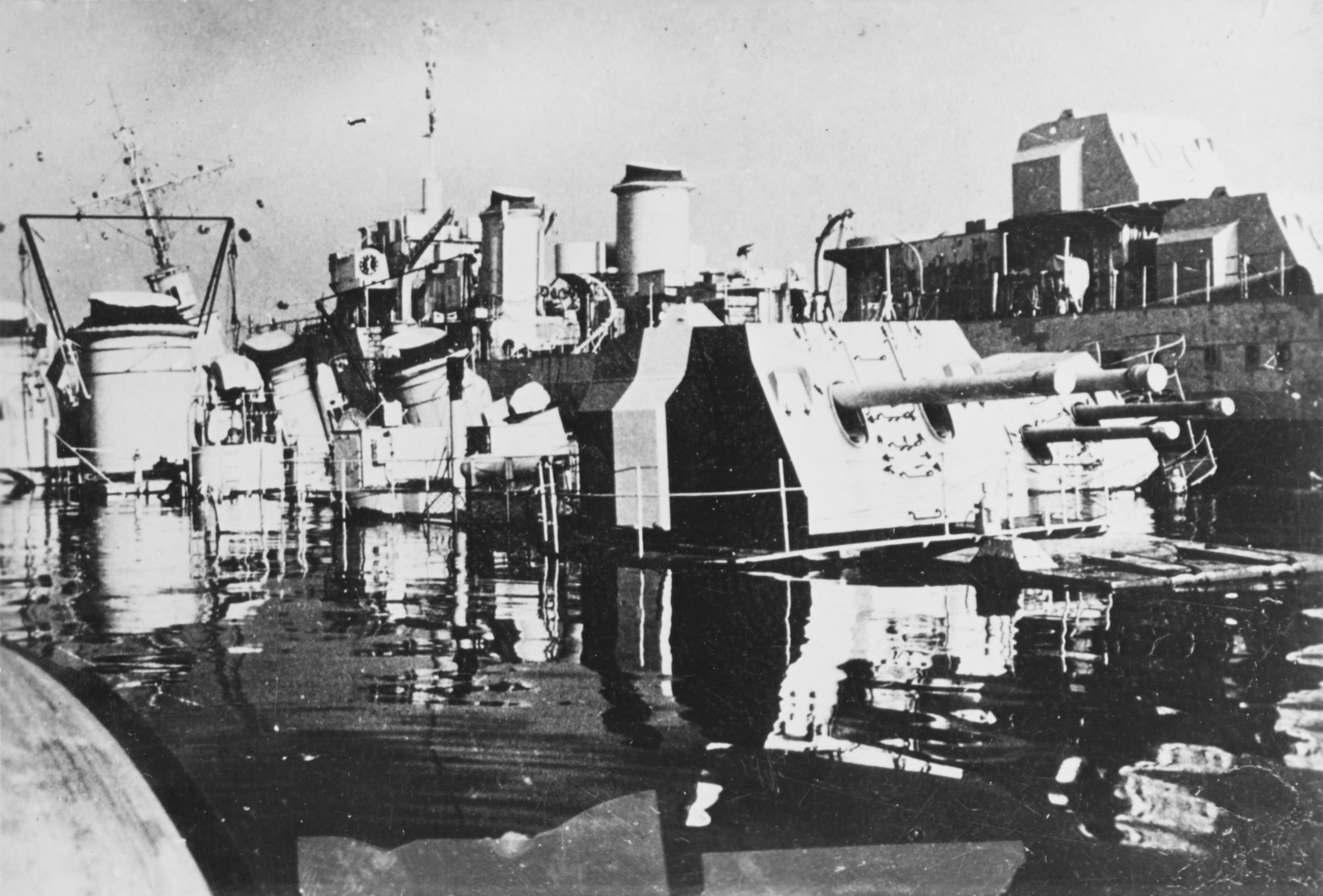
Scuttled at Toulon, from left: Trombe, Foudroyant, Le Hardi, and Bison

The ship escorted troop transports between Algiers, French Algeria, and Marseille 3–5 July. Le Hardi was assigned to the Forces de haute mer (FHM) on 18 August; she was joined by the rest of the 10th DT, consisting of L'Adroit (the renamed Épée) and Mameluk on 1 November. Le Hardi was reduced to reserve on 20 May 1942. When the Germans attempted to capture the French ships in Toulon on 27 November 1942, Le Hardi was scuttled by her crew. The Italians refloated her on 12 June 1943 and redesignated her as FR37. On 6 September she departed Toulon under tow for Genoa, Italy; she was captured by the German en route in Savona, Italy, after the Italian armistice on 9 September. Unrepaired, the ship was scuttled in Genoa on 20 April 1945 and later scrapped.
