= French destroyer Lansquenet (1939) =

French Le Hardi-class destroyer

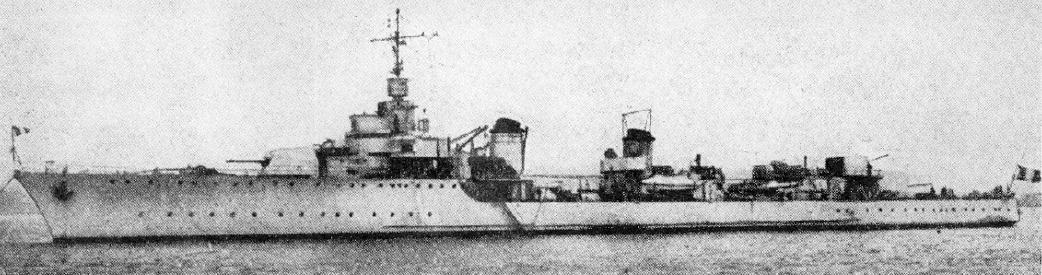
- Sister ship Le Hardi at anchor

History

France
- Name: Lansquenet
- Namesake: Landsknecht
- Ordered: 4 May 1936
- Builder: Forges et Chantiers de la Gironde, Lormont
- Laid down: 17 December 1936
- Launched: 20 May 1939
- Commissioned: 1 June 1940
- Stricken: 22 September 1958
- Captured: 27 November 1942
- Fate: Scuttled, 27 November 1942

General characteristics
- Class & type: Le Hardi-class destroyer
- Displacement: 1,800 t (1,772 long tons) (standard ); 2,577 t (2,536 long tons) (deep load)
- Length: 117.2 m (384 ft 6 in) (o/a)
- Beam: 11.1 m (36 ft 5 in)
- Draft: 3.8 m (12 ft 6 in)
- Installed power: 4 × forced-circulation boilers; 58,000 PS (42,659 kW; 57,207 shp)
- Propulsion: 2 × shafts; 2 × geared steam turbines
- Speed: 37 knots (69 km/h; 43 mph)
- Range: 3,100 nautical miles (5,700 km; 3,600 mi) at 10 knots (19 km/h; 12 mph)
- Complement: 187 officers and enlisted men
- Armament: 3 × twin 130 mm (5.1 in) guns; 1 × twin 37 mm (1.5 in) AA guns; 2 × twin 13.2 mm (0.5 in) anti-aircraft machineguns; 1 × triple + 2 × twin 550 mm (21.7 in) torpedo tubes; 2 × chutes; 12 × depth charges

The French destroyer Lansquenet was one of a dozen Le Hardi-class destroyers built for the French Navy during the late 1930s. Placed into service after the French signed an armistice with the Germans in June 1940, she sailed to French Morocco to avoid capture. In November the ship helped to escort one of the battleships damaged by the British during their July attack on Mers-el-Kébir, French Algeria, back to France. Placed in reserve afterwards, she was scuttled to prevent her capture when the Germans occupied Vichy France in November 1942. Lansquenet was salvaged in 1943 by the Regia Marina (Royal Italian Navy) and captured by the Germans after the Italian armistice in September. They scuttled the ship in Italy in 1945; she was refloated in 1946, but was never repaired. She was stricken in 1958, then scrapped.

== Design and description ==
The Le Hardi class was designed to escort the fast battleships of the Dunkerque class and to counter the large destroyers of the Italian Navigatori and Japanese Fubuki classes. The ships had an overall length of 117.2 meters (384 ft 6 in), a beam of 11.1 meters (36 ft 5 in), and a draft of 3.8 meters (12 ft 6 in). The ships displaced 1,800 metric tons (1,772 long tons) at standard and 2,577 t (2,536 long tons) at deep load. They were powered by two geared steam turbines, each driving one propeller shaft, using steam provided by four Sural-Penhöet forced-circulation boilers. The turbines were designed to produce 58,000 metric horsepower (42,659 kW; 57,207 shp), which was intended to give the ships a maximum speed of 37 knots (69 km/h; 43 mph). Le Hardi, the only ship of the class to run sea trials, comfortably exceeded that speed during her trials on 6 November 1939, reaching a maximum speed of 39.1 knots (72.4 km/h; 45.0 mph) from 60,450 metric horsepower (44,461 kW; 59,623 shp). The ships carried 470 metric tons (463 long tons) of fuel oil which gave them a range of 3,100 nautical miles (5,700 km; 3,600 mi) at 10 knots (19 km/h; 12 mph). The crew consisted of 10 officers and 177 enlisted men.

The main armament of the Le Hardi-class ships consisted of six Canon de 130 mm (5.1 in) Modèle 1932 guns in three twin mounts, one forward and a superfiring pair aft of the superstructure. Their anti-aircraft (AA) armament consisted of one twin mount for Canon de 37 mm (1.5 in) Modèle 1925 guns on the aft superstructure and two twin Hotchkiss Mitrailleuse de 13.2 mm (0.52 in) CA Modèle 1929 machine gun mounts on the roof of the shell hoists for the forward 130 mm mount. The ships carried one triple and two twin sets of 550-millimeter (21.7 in) torpedo tubes; the aft mount could traverse to both sides, but the forward mounts were positioned one on each broadside. A pair of chutes were built into the stern that housed a dozen 200-kilogram (440 lb) depth charges.

== Construction and career ==
Ordered on 4 May 1936, Lansquenet was laid down by Forges et Chantiers de la Gironde at their shipyard in Lormont on 17 December 1936. She was launched on 20 May 1939 and entered service in 1940. The ship had been manned for trials on 1 June and was still fitting out when she steamed, for the first time under her own power, from Bordeaux to Casablanca, French Morocco on 27 June, despite being unsuccessfully engaged by German artillery on her way up the Gironde River. The following months saw five of the Le Hardi-class ships ordered to Oran to escort the battleship Provence; Lansquenet arrived there on 5 November. Departing that day, they arrived at Toulon three days later after which she was placed in reserve, still not fully completed.

When the Germans attempted to capture the French ships in Toulon intact on 27 November 1942 during the occupation of Vichy France, Lansquenet was in nearby La Seyne-sur-Mer in reserve and was scuttled by her crew. The Italians refloated her on 24 April 1943 and redesignated her as FR34. After the Italian armistice of 9 September, the ship was captured by the Germans at Imperia, Italy, and renamed TA34. She was scuttled in Genoa, Italy, on 24 April 1945. Salvaged and towed back to Toulon on 19 March 1946, the ship was renamed Cyclone. Despite never have been repaired, she was not stricken from the Navy List until 22 September 1958 and was then subsequently scrapped.
