= French destroyer Mameluk =

French Le Hardi-class destroyer

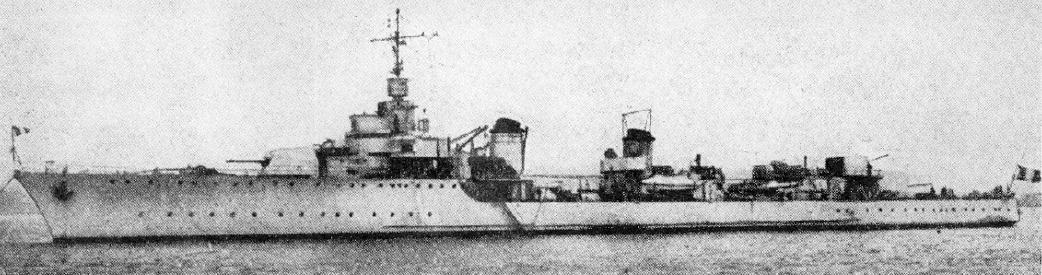
- Sister ship Le Hardi at anchor

History

France
- Name: Mameluk
- Namesake: Mameluk
- Ordered: 4 May 1936
- Builder: Ateliers et Chantiers de la Loire, Nantes
- Laid down: 1 January 1937
- Launched: 18 February 1939
- In service: 17 June 1940
- Captured: 27 November 1942
- Fate: Scuttled, 27 November 1942

General characteristics
- Class & type: Le Hardi-class destroyer
- Displacement: 1,800 t (1,772 long tons) (standard ); 2,577 t (2,536 long tons) (deep load)
- Length: 117.2 m (384 ft 6 in) (o/a)
- Beam: 11.1 m (36 ft 5 in)
- Draft: 3.8 m (12 ft 6 in)
- Installed power: 58,000 PS (42,659 kW; 57,207 shp); 4 forced-circulation boilers
- Propulsion: 2 × shafts; 2 × geared steam turbines
- Speed: 37 knots (69 km/h; 43 mph)
- Range: 3,100 nautical miles (5,700 km; 3,600 mi) at 10 knots (19 km/h; 12 mph)
- Complement: 187 officers and enlisted men
- Armament: 3 × twin 130 mm (5.1 in) guns; 1 × twin 37 mm (1.5 in) AA guns; 2 × twin 13.2 mm (0.5 in) anti-aircraft machineguns; 1 × triple + 2 × twin 550 mm (21.7 in) torpedo tubes; 2 × chutes; 12 × depth charges

Mameluk was one of a dozen Le Hardi-class destroyers built for the French Navy during the late 1930s. The ship was completed during the Battle of France in mid-1940 and her first mission was to help escort an incomplete battleship to French Morocco only days before the French signed an armistice with the Germans in June. She then helped to escort one of the battleships damaged by the British during their July attack on Mers-el-Kébir, French Algeria, back to France in November. Mameluk returned to Morocco in early 1941 for convoy-escort duties and then was transferred back to France in late 1941.

When the Germans occupied Vichy France after the Allies landed in French North Africa in November 1942 and tried to seize the French fleet intact, the destroyer was one of the ships scuttled to prevent their capture. The Regia Marina (Royal Italian Navy) unsuccessfully attempted to salvage her in 1943. The ship was refloated in 1947 and subsequently scrapped.

== Design and description ==
The Le Hardi class was designed to escort the fast battleships of the Dunkerque class and to counter the large destroyers of the Italian Navigatori and Japanese Fubuki classes. The ships had an overall length of 117.2 meters (384 ft 6 in), a beam of 11.1 meters (36 ft 5 in), and a draft of 3.8 meters (12 ft 6 in). The ships displaced 1,800 metric tons (1,772 long tons) at standard and 2,577 t (2,536 long tons) at deep load. They were powered by two geared steam turbines, each driving one propeller shaft, using steam provided by four Sural-Penhöet forced-circulation boilers. The turbines were designed to produce 58,000 metric horsepower (42,659 kW; 57,207 shp), which was intended to give the ships a maximum speed of 37 knots (69 km/h; 43 mph). Le Hardi, the only ship of the class to run sea trials, comfortably exceeded that speed during her trials on 6 November 1939, reaching a maximum speed of 39.1 knots (72.4 km/h; 45.0 mph) from 60,450 metric horsepower (44,461 kW; 59,623 shp). The ships carried 470 metric tons (463 long tons) of fuel oil which gave them a range of 3,100 nautical miles (5,700 km; 3,600 mi) at 10 knots (19 km/h; 12 mph). The crew consisted of 10 officers and 177 enlisted men.

The main armament of the Le Hardi-class ships consisted of six Canon de 130 mm (5.1 in) Modèle 1932 guns in three twin mounts, one forward and a superfiring pair aft of the superstructure. Their anti-aircraft (AA) armament consisted of one twin mount for Canon de 37 mm (1.5 in) Modèle 1925 guns on the aft superstructure and two twin Hotchkiss 13.2 mm (0.5 in) AA machine gun mounts on the roof of the shell hoists for the forward 130 mm mount. The ships carried one triple and two twin sets of 550-millimeter (21.7 in) torpedo tubes; the aft mount could traverse to both sides, but the forward mounts were positioned one on each broadside. A pair of chutes were built into the stern that housed a dozen 200-kilogram (440 lb) depth charges.

=== Modifications ===
By April 1941 Mameluk had received a pair of single mounts for Browning 13.2-millimeter AA machine guns on the quarterdeck. Later that year or in early 1942 the Brownings were repositioned on platforms on the sides of the superfiring turret aft, the twin Hotchkiss machine guns were transferred to the quarterdeck, and a pair of single mounts for 25 mm (1 in) Hotchkiss AA guns were installed in the former location of the Hotchkiss guns in front of the bridge.

== Construction and career ==
Ordered on 4 May 1936, Mameluk was laid down by Ateliers et Chantiers de la Loire at their shipyard in Nantes on 1 January 1937. She was launched on 18 February 1939 and entered service on 17 June 1940. Two days later the ship, together with her sisters Le Hardi and Épée, helped to escort the incomplete battleship Jean Bart from Saint-Nazaire to Casablanca, French Morocco, where they arrived three days later. The following months saw five of the Le Hardi-class ships ordered to Oran to escort the battleship Provence; Mameluk arrived there on 5 November. Departing that day, they arrived at Toulon three days later after which she was placed in reserve.

The ship was transferred to Morocco for convoy escort duties on 8 May 1941 and returned to Toulon on 23 October. On 1 November the 10th DT (division de torpilleurs), consisting of Mameluk, L'Adroit (the renamed Épée) and Le Hardi, was assigned to the Forces de haute mer (High Seas Forces). When the Germans attempted to capture the French ships in Toulon on 27 November 1942, Mameluk was scuttled by her crew. The Italians attempted to salvage her, but the ship was damaged by a bomb during the Allied bombing raid on 4 February 1944; sunk on 6 August 1944 by the USAAF 47th Bomb Wing. She was finally refloated in 1947 and scrapped.
