= French ship L'Adroit =

At least three ships of the French Navy have been named L'Adroit:

- French destroyer L'Adroit (1927), a L'Adroit-class destroyer launched in 1927 and sunk in 1940.
- French destroyer L'Adroit (1941), a Le Hardi-class destroyer launched in 1938 as Épée, she was renamed in 1941 and scuttled in 1942
- French patrol vessel L'Adroit, a Gowind-class corvette sold to Argentina in 2018 and renamed ARA Bouchard
