= French ship Trombe =

At least two ships of the French Navy have been named Trombe (meaning waterspout):

- French torpedo boat Trombe, a Cyclone-class torpedo boat launched in 1900.
- French destroyer Trombe, a Bourrasque-class destroyer launched in 1925 and scuttled in 1942.
