= French destroyer Épée (1938) =

French Le Hardi-class destroyer

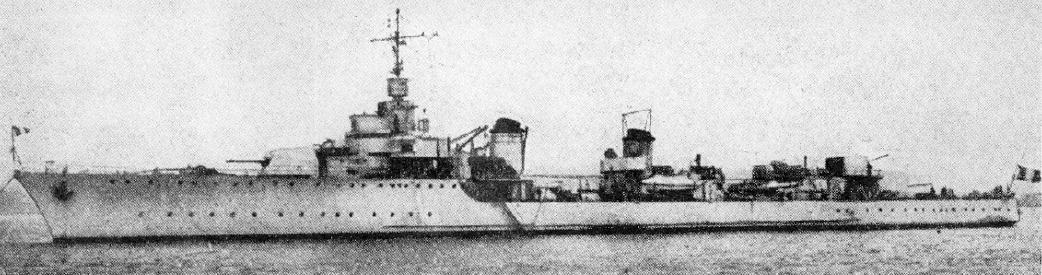
- Sister ship Le Hardi at anchor

History

France
- Name: Epée
- Namesake: Épée
- Ordered: 31 December 1935
- Builder: Forges et Chantiers de la Gironde, Lormont
- Laid down: 15 October 1936
- Launched: 26 October 1938
- In service: 14 June 1940
- Renamed: L'Adroit, 29 March 1941
- Captured: 27 November 1942
- Fate: Scuttled, 27 November 1942

General characteristics
- Class & type: Le Hardi-class destroyer
- Displacement: 1,800 t (1,772 long tons) (standard ); 2,577 t (2,536 long tons) (deep load)
- Length: 117.2 m (384 ft 6 in) (o/a)
- Beam: 11.1 m (36 ft 5 in)
- Draft: 3.8 m (12 ft 6 in)
- Installed power: 4 Forced-circulation boilers; 58,000 PS (42,659 kW; 57,207 shp)
- Propulsion: 2 × shafts; 2 × geared steam turbines
- Speed: 37 knots (69 km/h; 43 mph)
- Range: 3,100 nautical miles (5,700 km; 3,600 mi) at 10 knots (19 km/h; 12 mph)
- Complement: 187 officers and enlisted men
- Armament: 3 × twin 130 mm (5.1 in) guns; 1 × twin 37 mm (1.5 in) AA guns; 2 × twin 13.2 mm (0.52 in) anti-aircraft machineguns; 1 × triple + 2 × twin 550 mm (21.7 in) torpedo tubes; 8 depth charges; 1 × chute

The French destroyer Épée was one of a dozen Le Hardi-class destroyers built for the French Navy during the late 1930s. The ship was completed during the Battle of France in mid-1940 and her first mission was to help escort an incomplete battleship to French Morocco only days before the French signed an armistice with the Germans. After the British attack on Dakar in September, she was one of four destroyers ordered to attack British shipping, although there was only an inconclusive duel with a British destroyer. Épée helped to escort one of the battleships damaged by the British during their July Attack on Mers-el-Kébir, French Algeria, back to France in November. She was transferred back to French Morocco in May 1941 for convoy-escort duties that lasted until October.

When the Germans occupied Vichy France after the Allies landed in French North Africa in November 1942 and tried to seize the French fleet, Épée was one of the ships scuttled to prevent their capture. She was salvaged by the Regia Marina (Royal Italian Navy) in 1943, but was sunk again by Allied bombers. The ship was refloated in 1945 and subsequently scrapped.

== Design and description ==
The Le Hardi class was designed to escort the fast battleships of the Dunkerque class and to counter the large destroyers of the Italian Navigatori and Japanese Fubuki classes. The ships had an overall length of 117.2 meters (384 ft 6 in), a beam of 11.1 meters (36 ft 5 in), and a draft of 3.8 meters (12 ft 6 in). The ships displaced 1,800 metric tons (1,772 long tons) at standard and 2,577 t (2,536 long tons) at deep load. They were powered by two geared steam turbines, each driving one propeller shaft, using steam provided by four Sural-Penhöet forced-circulation boilers. The turbines were designed to produce 58,000 metric horsepower (42,659 kW; 57,207 shp), which was intended to give the ships a maximum speed of 37 knots (69 km/h; 43 mph). Le Hardi, the only ship of the class to run sea trials, comfortably exceeded that speed during her trials on 6 November 1939, reaching a maximum speed of 39.1 knots (72.4 km/h; 45.0 mph) from 60,450 metric horsepower (44,461 kW; 59,623 shp). The ships carried 470 metric tons (463 long tons) of fuel oil which gave them a range of 3,100 nautical miles (5,700 km; 3,600 mi) at 10 knots (19 km/h; 12 mph). The crew consisted of 10 officers and 177 enlisted men.

The main armament of the Le Hardi-class ships consisted of six Canon de 130 mm Modèle 1932 guns in three twin mounts, one forward and a superfiring pair aft of the superstructure. Their anti-aircraft (AA) armament consisted of one twin mount for 37 mm (1.5 in) AA guns and two twin Hotchkiss 13.2 mm (0.52 in) anti-aircraft machine gun mounts. The ships carried one triple and two twin sets of 550-millimeter (21.7 in) torpedo tubes, all above-water. One depth charge chute was built into the stern; this housed eight 200-kilogram (440 lb) depth charges. The other side of the stern was used for the handling gear for a "Ginocchio" anti-submarine torpedo, but this was removed before the ship was completed.

=== Modifications ===
In late 1941 and early 1942 the twin Hotchkiss machine guns were repositioned on the quarterdeck and a pair of single mounts for 25 mm (1 in) Hotchkiss AA guns were installed in their place in front of the bridge. In addition a pair of single mounts for Browning 13.2-millimeter AA machine guns were added on platforms on the sides of the superfiring turret aft.

== Construction and career ==
Ordered on 31 December 1935, Épée was laid down by Forges et Chantiers de la Gironde at their shipyard in Lormont on 15 October 1936. She was launched on 26 October 1938 and entered service on 14 June 1940. Five days later the ship, together with her sister ships Le Hardi and Mameluk, helped to escort the incomplete battleship Jean Bart from Saint-Nazaire to Casablanca, French Morocco, where they arrived three days later. On 28 July, Épée and Le Hardi sailed for Dakar, French West Africa and the former arrived back at Casablanca on 10 September. After the British attack on Dakar in September, Épée and her sister Fleuret, together with the destroyers Fougueux and Frondeur were ordered to attack British shipping in the Strait of Gibraltar in retaliation. They encountered only an unidentified British destroyer and all of Épée's guns malfunctioned after firing a total of only 14 rounds. The ships continued onward to Oran, French Algeria, and Épée returned to Casablanca on 30 September. Amid high tensions with the United Kingdom, Épée and the destroyer Casque escorted the tanker Lot and the submarines L'Espoir, Monge, Pégase, and Vengeur through the Strait of Gibraltar during a voyage Lot and the submarines made from Oran to Casablanca between 16 and 18 October 1940.

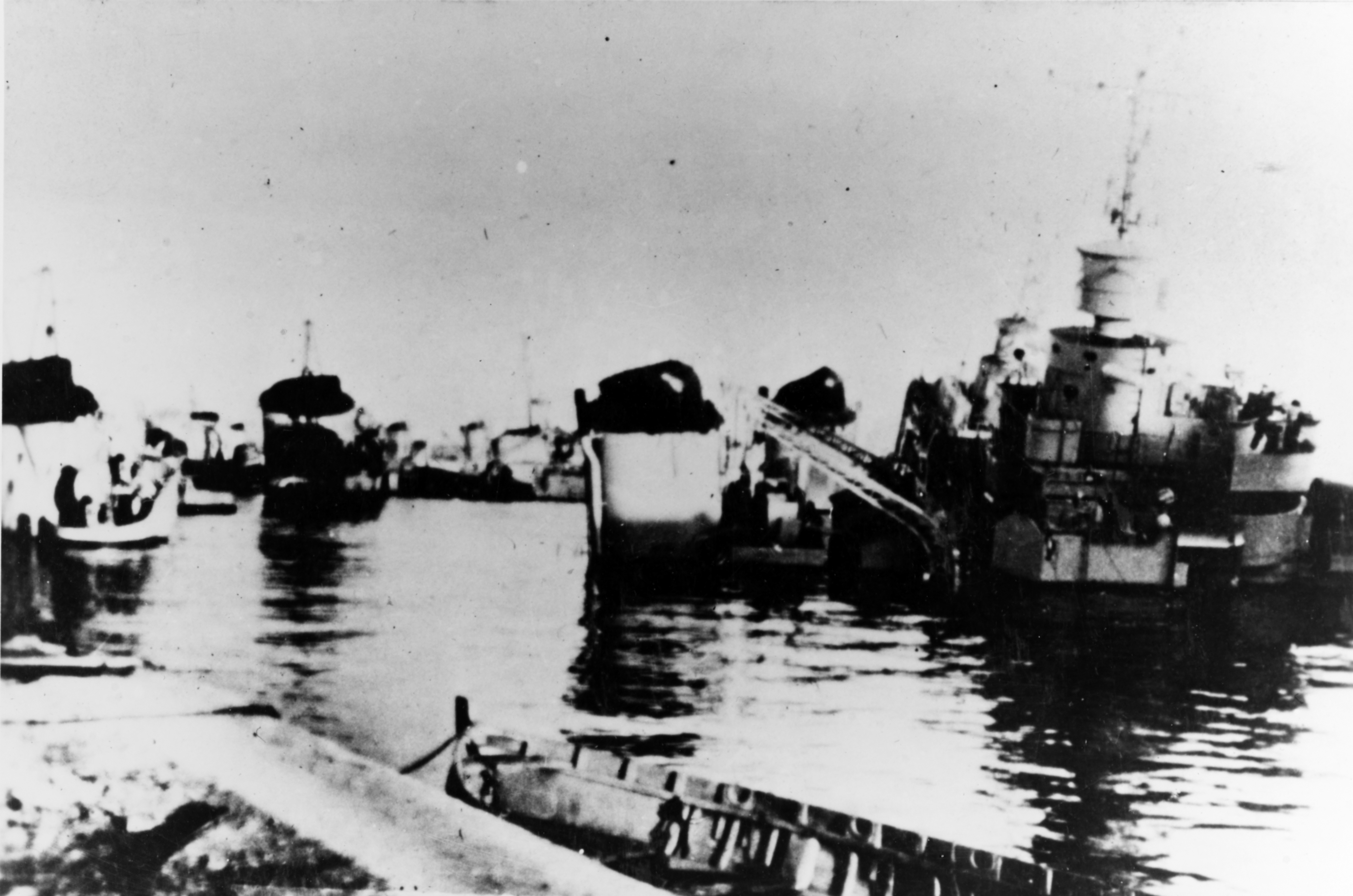
L'Adroit in the foreground and the large destroyer Volta behind her after being scuttled in Toulon on 27 November 1942

The following months saw five of the Le Hardi-class ships ordered to Oran to escort the battleship Provence, which had been damaged during the July British attack on Mers-el-Kébir, Algeria, to Toulon; Épée arrived there on 5 November. Departing the following day, they arrived at Toulon two days later at which time the ship was reduced to reserve. On 29 March 1941, Épée was renamed L'Adroit to commemorate the destroyer of that name that had been sunk during the Battle of France in 1940. The ship was transferred to Morocco on 8 May for convoy-escort duties and returned to Toulon on 4 October. On 1 November the 10th DT (division de torpilleurs), consisting of L'Adroit, Le Hardi and Mameluk, was assigned to the Forces de haute mer. When the Nazi Germans attempted to capture the French ships intact in Toulon on 27 November 1942, L'Adroit was scuttled by her crew. The Italians raised her on 20 April 1943 and redesignated her as FR33, but the ship was badly damaged during Allied bombing raids on 24 November 1943 and 4 February 1944; she was refloated in September 1945 and broken up.
