= L'Adroit =

L'Adroit may refer to:

- French ship L'Adroit - multiple French warships
- L'Adroit-class destroyer
