= French destroyer Le Flibustier =

French Le Hardi-class destroyer

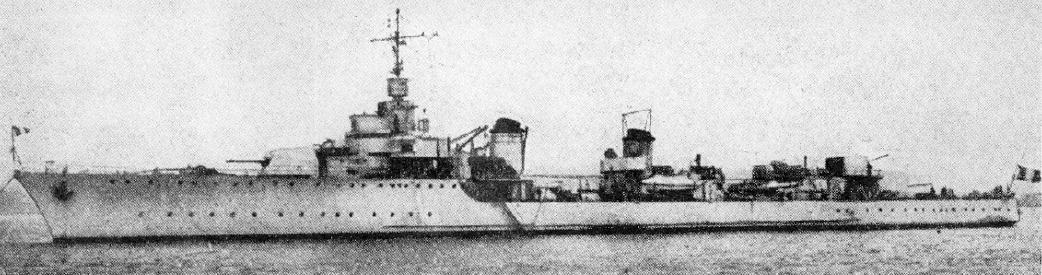
- Sister ship Le Hardi at anchor

History

France
- Name: Le Flibustier
- Namesake: Filibuster
- Ordered: 24 May 1937
- Builder: Forges et Chantiers de la Méditerranée, La Seyne-sur-Mer
- Laid down: 11 March 1938
- Launched: 19 December 1939
- Commissioned: 1 June 1940
- Renamed: Bison, 1 April 1941
- Captured: 27 November 1942
- Fate: Sunk, 1944, and scrapped

General characteristics
- Class & type: Le Hardi-class destroyer
- Displacement: 1,800 t (1,772 long tons) (standard ); 2,577 t (2,536 long tons) (deep load)
- Length: 117.2 m (384 ft 6 in) (o/a)
- Beam: 11.1 m (36 ft 5 in)
- Draft: 3.8 m (12 ft 6 in)
- Installed power: 58,000 PS (42,659 kW; 57,207 shp); 4 forced-circulation boilers
- Propulsion: 2 × Shafts; 2 × geared steam turbines
- Speed: 37 knots (69 km/h; 43 mph)
- Range: 3,100 nautical miles (5,700 km; 3,600 mi) at 10 knots (19 km/h; 12 mph)
- Complement: 187 officers and enlisted men
- Armament: 3 × twin 130 mm (5.1 in) guns; 1 × twin 37 mm (1.5 in) AA guns; 2 × twin 13.2 mm (0.5 in) anti-aircraft machineguns; 1 × triple + 2 × twin 550 mm (21.7 in) torpedo tubes; 2 × chutes; 12 ×depth charges

The French destroyer Le Flibustier was one of a dozen Le Hardi-class destroyers built for the French Navy during the late 1930s. Still incomplete when the French signed an armistice to end the Battle of France, material shortages prevented her completion and she was placed in reserve. The ship was renamed Bison in early 1941. When the Germans occupied Vichy France after the Allies landed in French North Africa in November 1942 and tried to seize the French fleet intact, the destroyer was one of the few ships not scuttled to prevent their capture. She was turned over to the Regia Marina (Royal Italian Navy) in 1943, but was seized by the Germans after the Italian armistice in September. The ship was salvaged in 1945 and later scrapped.

== Design and description ==
The Le Hardi class was designed to escort the fast battleships of the Dunkerque class and to counter the large destroyers of the Italian Navigatori and Japanese Fubuki classes. The ships had an overall length of 117.2 meters (384 ft 6 in), a beam of 11.1 meters (36 ft 5 in), and a draft of 3.8 meters (12 ft 6 in). The ships displaced 1,800 metric tons (1,772 long tons) at standard and 2,577 t (2,536 long tons) at deep load. They were powered by two geared steam turbines, each driving one propeller shaft, using steam provided by four Sural-Penhöet forced-circulation boilers. The turbines were designed to produce 58,000 metric horsepower (42,659 kW; 57,207 shp), which was intended to give the ships a maximum speed of 37 knots (69 km/h; 43 mph). Le Hardi, the only ship of the class to run sea trials, comfortably exceeded that speed during her trials on 6 November 1939, reaching a maximum speed of 39.1 knots (72.4 km/h; 45.0 mph) from 60,450 metric horsepower (44,461 kW; 59,623 shp). The ships carried 470 metric tons (463 long tons) of fuel oil which gave them a range of 3,100 nautical miles (5,700 km; 3,600 mi) at 10 knots (19 km/h; 12 mph). The crew consisted of 10 officers and 177 enlisted men.

The main armament of the Le Hardi-class ships consisted of six Canon de 130 mm Modèle 1932 guns in three twin mounts, one forward and a superfiring pair aft of the superstructure. Their anti-aircraft (AA) armament consisted of one twin mount for 37 mm (1.5 in) guns and two twin Hotchkiss 13.2 mm (0.5 in) AA machine gun mounts. The ships carried one triple and two twin sets of 550-millimeter (21.7 in) torpedo tubes, all above-water. A pair of chutes were built into the stern that housed a dozen 200-kilogram (440 lb) depth charges.

== Construction and career ==
Ordered on 24 May 1937, Le Flibuster was built by Forges et Chantiers de la Méditerranée at their shipyard in La Seyne-sur-Mer. She was laid down on 11 March 1938 and launched on 19 December 1939. The ship remained at Toulon after the French surrendered on 22 June 1940 and began her trials the following day, although she still lacked her armament. She was then reduced to reserve. On 1 April 1941, Le Flibuster was renamed Bison to commemorate the large destroyer of that name that was sunk during the Norwegian Campaign of 1940.

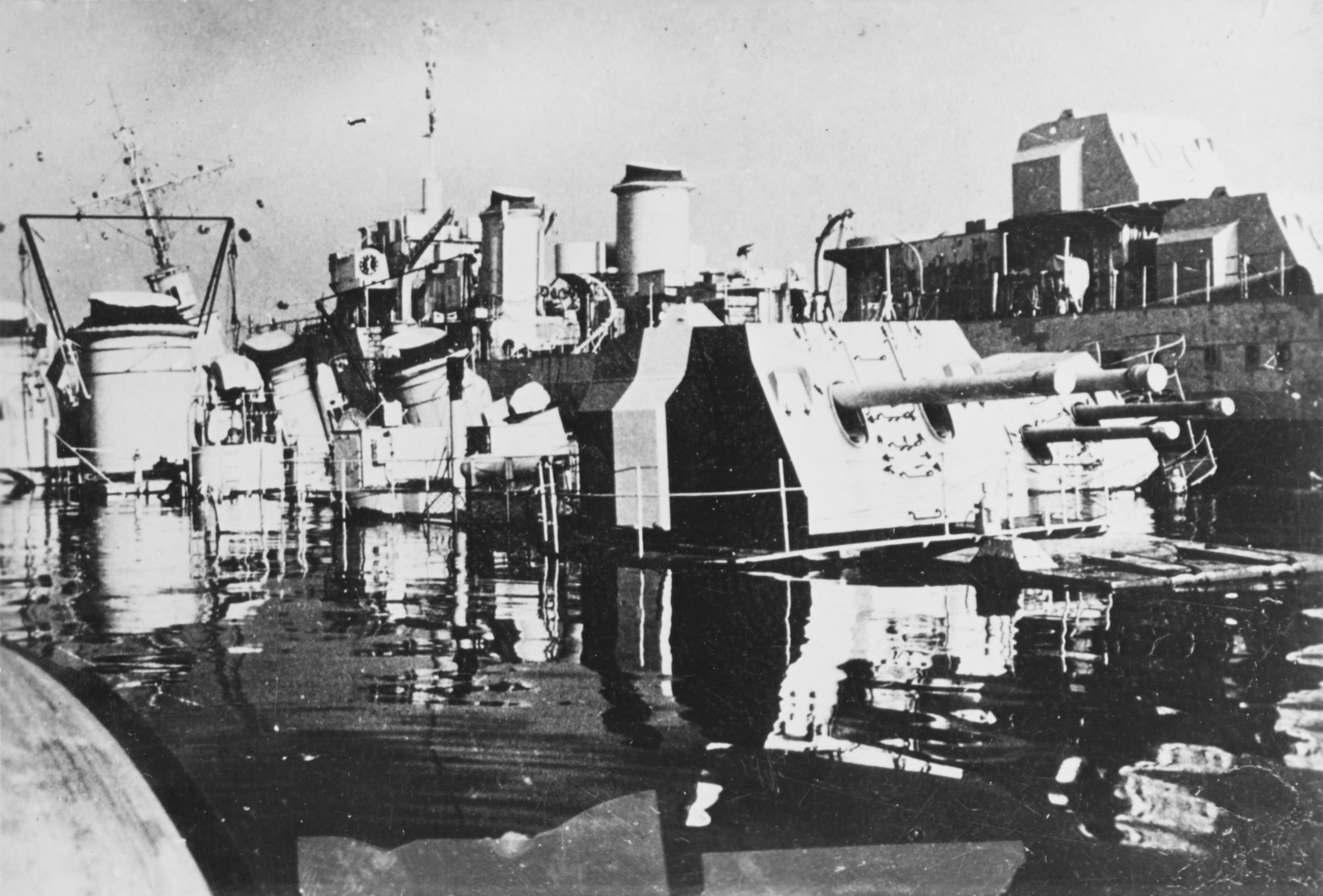
Scuttled at Toulon, from left: Trombe, Foudroyant, Le Hardi, and Bison

Unlike most of the ships in Toulon, Bison was undamaged when the Germans attempted to capture the French ships there on 27 November 1942 because she was still in reserve and did not have any crew assigned to scuttle her. The Italians rejected a German request to complete her and redesignated her as FR35. After the Italian armistice in September, she was used as a smoke-generator hulk by the Germans. She was first damaged during an Allied air raid in early 1944 and then by a collision with a German submarine on 25 June. The ship sank in the commercial port of Brégaillon-Toulon; she was refloated the following year and scrapped.
