= French submarine Phénix (Q157) =

French submarine in service between 1932 and 1939

Phénix
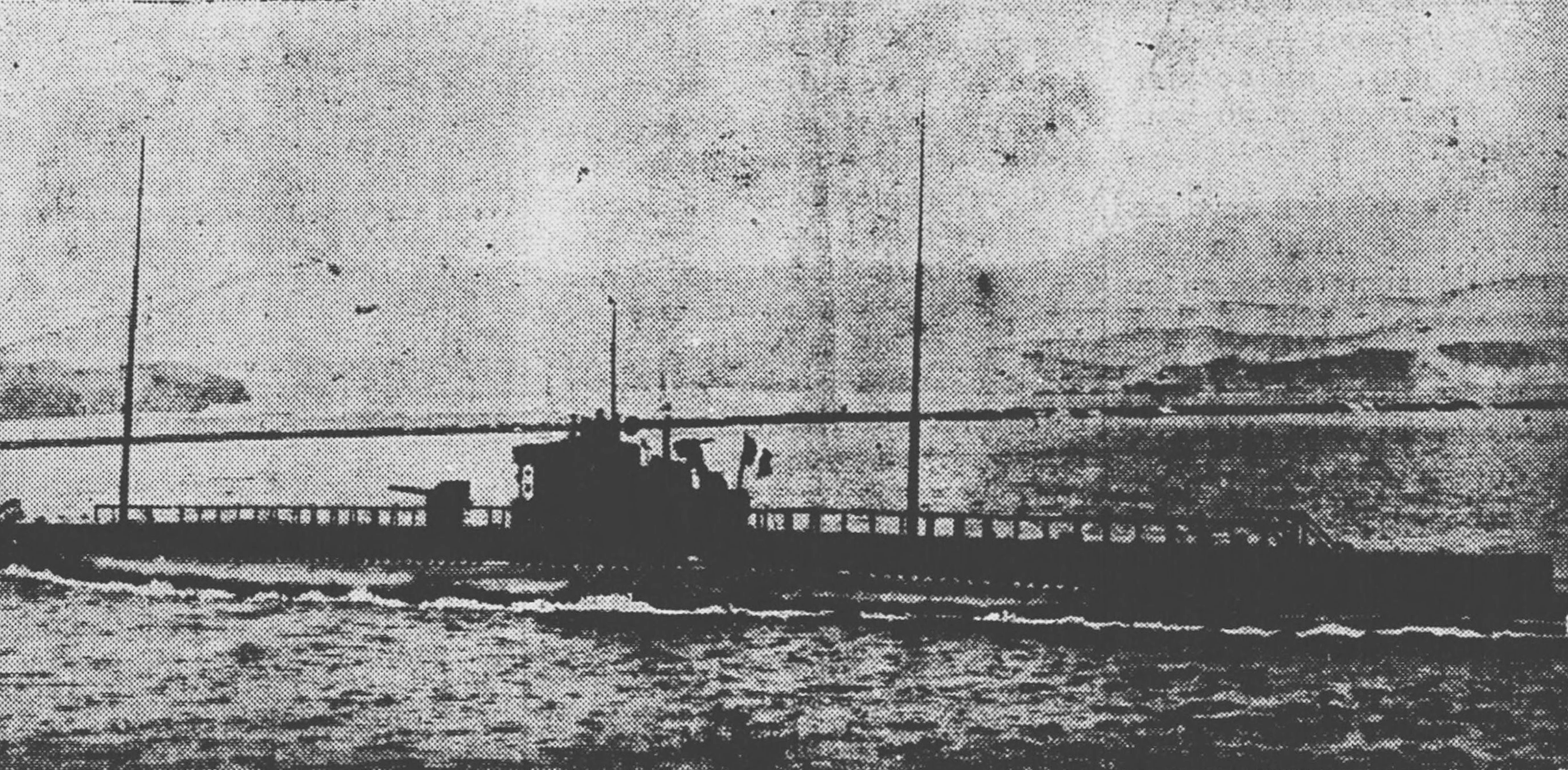
- Phénix at Toulon, France, prior to her November 1938 departure for French Indochina.

History

France
- Name: Phénix
- Namesake: Phoenix, an immortal bird in Greek mythology
- Operator: French Navy
- Builder: Chantiers Dubigeon, Nantes, France
- Laid down: 5 November 1928
- Launched: 12 April 1930
- Commissioned: 21 October 1932
- Home port: Brest, France
- Fate: Sank 15 June 1939

General characteristics
- Class & type: Redoutable-class submarine
- Displacement: 1,572 tonnes (1,547 long tons) (surfaced); 2,092 tonnes (2,059 long tons) (submerged)
- Length: 92.3 m (302 ft 10 in)
- Beam: 8.1 m (26 ft 7 in)
- Draft: 4.4 m (14 ft 5 in) (surfaced)
- Propulsion: 2 × diesel engines, 6,000 hp (4,474 kW); 2 × electric motors, 2,250 hp (1,678 kW)
- Speed: 17.5 kn (32.4 km/h; 20.1 mph) (surfaced); 10 kn (19 km/h; 12 mph) (submerged)
- Range: 14,000 nmi (26,000 km; 16,000 mi) at 7 kn (13 km/h; 8.1 mph) (surfaced); 10,000 nmi (19,000 km; 12,000 mi) at 10 kn (19 km/h; 12 mph) (surfaced); 4,000 nmi (7,400 km; 4,600 mi) at 17 kn (31 km/h; 20 mph) (surfaced); 90 nmi (170 km; 100 mi) at 7 kn (13 km/h; 8.1 mph) (submerged)
- Test depth: 80 m (262 ft)
- Complement: 5 officers (6 in operations); 66 men
- Armament: 11 torpedo tubes; 1 × 100 mm (3.9 in) gun; 1 × 13.2 mm (0.5 in) machine gun

Phénix was a French Navy Redoutable-class submarine of the M6 series commissioned in 1932. She sank in a diving accident with the loss of all hands in June 1939.

== Characteristics ==
Profile of Casabianca, sister ship of Phénix.

Phénix was part of a fairly homogeneous series of 31 deep-sea patrol submarines also called "1,500-tonners" because of their displacement. All entered service between 1931 and 1939.

The Redoutable-class submarines were 92.3 metres (302 ft 10 in) long and 8.1 metres (26 ft 7 in) in beam and had a draft of 4.4 metres (14 ft 5 in). They could dive to a depth of 80 metres (262 ft). They displaced 1,572 tonnes (1,547 long tons) on the surface and 2,082 tonnes (2,049 long tons) underwater. Propelled on the surface by two diesel engines producing a combined 6,000 horsepower (4,474 kW), they had a maximum speed of 18.6 knots (34.4 km/h; 21.4 mph). When submerged, their two electric motors produced a combined 2,250 horsepower (1,678 kW) and allowed them to reach 10 knots (19 km/h; 12 mph). Also called “deep-cruising submarines”, their range on the surface was 10,000 nautical miles (19,000 km; 12,000 mi) at 10 knots (19 km/h; 12 mph). Underwater, they could travel 100 nautical miles (190 km; 120 mi) at 5 knots (9.3 km/h; 5.8 mph).

== Construction and commissioning ==
Laid down at Chantiers Dubigeon in Nantes, France, on 5 November 1928 with the hull number Q157, Phénix was launched on 12 April 1930. She was commissioned on 21 October 1932.

== Service history ==
=== Voyage to Southeast Asia ===
On 4 November 1938, Phénix got underway from Toulon, France, in company with her sister ship L'Espoir bound for French Indochina to reinforce French forces in Southeast Asia in the face of increasing tensions with Japan during the Second Sino-Japanese War. The destroyer La Railleuse escorted them as far as the island of La Galite in the Galite Islands off the northern coast of Tunisia, where the La Melpomène-class torpedo boat L'Iphigénie took over escort duty for them until they reached Malta. From there, the destroyer Épervier escorted them to Port Said, Egypt, where they anchored on 10 November 1938.

From Port Said, the submarines proceeded through the Suez Canal to the Red Sea, then called at Djibouti from 20 to 23 November 1938. After a stop at Aden, they headed across the Indian Ocean, interrupting their voyage with a visit to Colombo, Ceylon, from 2 to 8 December 1938. While they were off Singapore on 13 December 1938, Phénix′s rudder and stern diving planes broke down. On 15 December 1938, the two submarines anchored for the night off Cap Saint-Jacques on the coast of Cochinchina, the southern portion of French Indochina. They got back underway on 16 December 1938 and made their way up the Saigon River to Saigon, which they reached at 10:00 (although the handwritten personal diary of a sailor from the aviso Rigault de Genouilly mentions the presence of the submarines at Saigon on 28 November 1938). Upon arrival, Phénix entered Saigon Arsenal to begin repairs to her rudder and stern planes.

=== Operations in Southeast Asia ===
On 10 February 1939, Phénix′s repairs were complete, and on 13 February she and L'Espoir began a tour of Annam on the central coast of French Indochina. They stopped at Cam Ranh from 14 to 17 February, at Nha Trang from 17 to 20 February, at either Port Dayot or Cam Ranh from 21 to 23 February, and at Tourane from 24 to 27 February 1939. They returned to Saigon on 1 March 1939.

Phénix and L'Espoir departed Saigon on 14 March 1939 and took up their alert posts at Cam Ranh from 15 to 17 March. They returned to Saigon on 18 March 1939.

The two submarines got underway from Saigon again on 1 April 1939 and headed for the Gulf of Tonkin. They arrived at Haiphong on 5 April. During their stay there, Italy invaded Albania on 7 April 1939, and they received orders to prepare for possible combat operations against Italian forces. Departing Haiphong on 12 April, they made a cruise to Hạ Long Bay with a stop at Hòn Gai. They then conducted a reconnaissance of the anchorages at Île de la Surprise, Île des Merveilles, and the islet of Appowan. After calling at Haiphong from 17 to 19 April 1939, they headed back to Saigon, which they reached on 22 April 1939. Their crews then were granted shore leave at Da Lat.

On 13 June 1939, Phénix and L'Espoir departed Saigon to make a cruise first to Hong Kong, where they were due to arrive on 20 June 1939, and then to Manila in the Philippines, planning to pay a courtesy visit to British submariners at the former and American submariners at the latter. On the day of their departure, they took part in an exercise with the aviso Savorgnan de Brazza. At 12:00 on 14 June 1939, the submarines anchored at Cam Ranh, where they spent the night of 14–15 June 1939.

=== Loss ===
At 08:57 on 15 June 1939, Phénix and L'Espoir got back underway to take part that morning in training maneuvers with the light cruiser Lamotte-Picquet and aircraft in the South China Sea off Cam Ranh northeast of Saigon, including a mock attack on Lamotte-Picquet by the two submarines. At 09:30, they exited Cam Rahn Bay, and at 09:37 they were headed due west at 12 knots (22 km/h; 14 mph). They altered course to 40 degrees at 09:50, then to 60 degrees at 10:00.

A Loire 130 flying boat of Escadrille 5 based at Cat-Laï that was participating in the maneuvers reported that it had sighted Phénix on the surface on the horizon at 10:07 and was approaching her at 10:22. Still on a course of 60 degrees, Phénix submerged for the mock attack at 10:26 when 6.6 nautical miles (12.2 km; 7.6 mi) bearing 76 degrees from Cam Ranh Point, and L'Espoir submerged at 10:27 on a course of 120 degrees. L'Espoir fired her exercise torpedoes at Lamotte-Picquet and surfaced an hour after submerging.

Phénix failed to surface after the exercise, and L'Espoir began to search for her. With concern for Phénix′s safety growing as the day wore on, L'Espoir transmitted a message at 12:18 to report Phénix missing. When the news reached the French Commander-in-Chief of the Naval Forces in the Far East, Squadron Vice-Admiral Jean Decoux, at 15:00, he ordered Lamotte-Picquet to get back underway and return to the area to join the search. Lamotte-Picquet reached the scene at 16:35, and she and L'Espoir searched until 17:06, finding only a slick of diesel oil which had appeared on the surface in the area in which Phénix had disappeared. L'Espoir returned to Cam Ranh at 18:30. The French had no submarine rescue capability in East Asia, and the only British ship in the area equipped to render rescue and salvage assistance to Phénix, the Royal Navy submarine depot ship HMS Medway, had departed Hong Kong and was at Weihaiwei, China, at the time, loading supplies for the relief of the blockaded British concession of Tientsin, too far away to reach the scene in time to attempt to rescue Phénix′s crew. Would-be rescuers estimated that the oxygen supply aboard Phénix hed been exhausted by the night of 15–16 June and that any of the five officers and 66 enlisted men aboard the submarine who initially had survived her sinking had suffocated.

The search resumed on 16 June 1939 under Decoux′s personal command. With Decoux aboard, L'Espoir put back to sea that morning and joined Lamotte-Picquet, the aviso Marne, and the survey ship Octant in the search. Strong currents interfered with the search, but during the morning, a Loire 130 flying boat of Escadrille 5 took advantage of favorable lighting conditions to spot Phénix′s wreck, which was 12 nautical miles (22 km; 14 mi) northeast of the island of Hon Chut, 11.7 nautical miles (21.7 km; 13.5 mi) bearing 53 degrees from Hon-Chut Light. Phénix lay with her bow pointing north. Her stern rested on the seabed at a depth of 105 metres (344 ft), while her bow floated at a depth of 40 metres (131 ft). The aircraft′s crew noted a protuberance from Phénix′s western side, and assessed it to be her conning tower. Marne marked the location of the wreck and observed air and diesel oil bubbles reaching the surface, indicating that the wreck was slowly filling with water and eventually would sink. On 17 June 1939, the French government announced that Phénix′s entire crew was presumed dead.

Salvage activities began on 22 June 1939 with several efforts to place a chain around Phénix′s hull so that it could be towed into shallower water where divers could reach it. On 28 June 1939, the United States Asiatic Fleet submarine rescue vessel USS Pigeon (ASR-6) arrived on the scene, but salvage work had succeeded only in towing Phénix′s wreck to a depth of 95 metres (312 ft), too deep for Pigeon′s divers to reach. Salvage efforts ended on 5 July 1939, and that day a memorial service for the men lost aboard Phénix took place aboard Lamotte-Picquet over the location of Phénix′s wreck.

The impossibility of refloating Phénix meant that investigators never conclusively determined the cause of her loss. The French Navy submarine force noted that Redoutable-class submarines had poor habitability in tropical climates, and rumors circulated that Phénix′s engine room crew had bragged of shunting the closing indicators of her diesel engine panels without the knowledge of her officers to improve ventilation and fight the stifling heat inside the submarine, causing the panels to remain open during the dive and resulting in catastrophic flooding. Another possibility considered was flooding resulting from one or more of her deck hatches accidentally being left open when she submerged. However, the investigation concluded on 19 July 1939 with the determination that the most probable cause of her loss was an explosion that occurred when Phénix′s batteries released hydrogen gas due to Phénix′s poor material condition, and that the explosion had killed or incapacitated the officers and men in her control room, rendering them incapable of carrying out the maneuvers necessary to save Phénix. The French government did not issue an official press release announcing the finding.

=== Aftermath ===
The loss of Phénix was the third submarine disaster in less than a month, following the sinking of the U.S. Navy's USS Squalus on 23 May 1939 and of the Royal Navy's HMS Thetis on 1 June 1939. This coincidence — as well as the destruction of the French ocean liner Paris in a fire on 18 April 1939 — prompted speculation in the French press in the aftermath of the Phénix disaster that the loss of one or more of the three submarines, as well as that of Paris, was the result of a sabotage campaign directed against Western democracies. In an op-ed published in the New York Times on 17 June 1939, United States Navy Reserve Commander Edward Ellsberg debunked the sabotage conspiracy theory, citing the improbability of a foreign agent being assigned to a submarine crew or of a saboteur gaining unobserved access during a visit to a submarine in port.

In March 1941, the crews of Phénix′s sister ships Monge and Pégase held a memorial service over the site of the wreck of Phénix.
