= Le Hardi-class destroyer =

Class of French destroyers

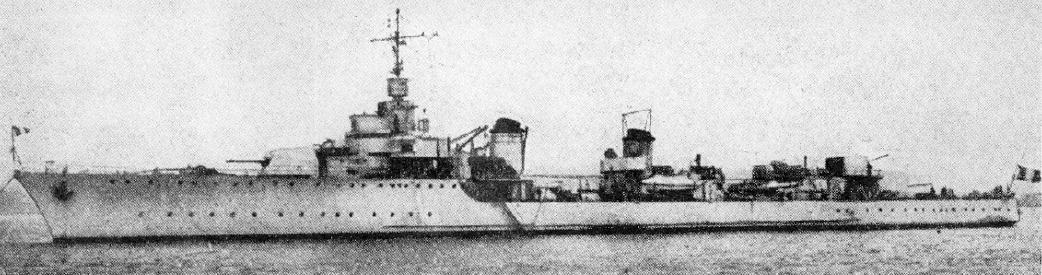
- Le Hardi-class destroyer

Class overview
- Name: Le Hardi class
- Operators: French Navy; Regia Marina
- Preceded by: L'Adroit class
- Succeeded by: T 47 class
- Planned: 12
- Completed: 7
- Lost: 8
- Scrapped: 4

General characteristics
- Type: Destroyer
- Displacement: 1,800 t (1,772 long tons) (standard); 2,577 t (2,536 long tons) (deep load)
- Length: 117.2 m (384 ft 6 in) (o/a)
- Beam: 11.1 m (36 ft 5 in)
- Draught: 3.8 m (12 ft 6 in)
- Installed power: 4 forced-circulation boilers; 58,000 PS (43,000 kW; 57,000 shp)
- Propulsion: 2 × shafts; 2 × geared steam turbines
- Speed: 37 knots (69 km/h; 43 mph)
- Range: 3,100 nmi (5,700 km; 3,600 mi) at 10 knots (19 km/h; 12 mph)
- Complement: 187 officers and enlisted men
- Armament: 3 × twin 130 mm (5.1 in) guns; 1 × twin 37 mm (1.5 in) AA guns; 2 × twin 13.2 mm (0.52 in) anti-aircraft machineguns; 1 × triple + 2 × twin 550 mm (21.7 in) torpedo tubes; 8 or 12 depth charges; 1 or 2 × chutes
- Armour: Gun turrets: 20 mm (0.8 in)

The Le Hardi class consisted of twelve destroyers (French: torpilleurs d'escadre, lit. 'squadron torpedo boats') begun for the Marine Nationale (French Navy) during the late 1930s. Only seven ships were ultimately completed while construction of the remaining five ships was interrupted by the French defeat in the Battle of France in May–June 1940 and were never finished. The seven ships that were seaworthy sailed for French North Africa to prevent their capture by the advancing Germans. Several ships later sailed for French West Africa where Le Hardi played a minor role in the Battle of Dakar in September. The Germans captured two ships that were still under construction and attempted to finish them both before abandoning the effort in 1943.

The Vichy French reformed the High Sea Forces (Forces de haute mer (FHM)) after the French surrender in late June. After most of the sister ships returned to France in November, three of them were assigned to the FHM and the others were placed in reserve. The seven completed ships were scuttled in Toulon when the Germans occupied Vichy France in November 1942. The Regia Marina (Royal Italian Navy) salvaged most of them during 1943 and towed three of them to Italy for repairs. All of the ships were captured by the Germans after the Italian armistice in September, but they made little effort to finish the repairs. They did attempt to complete Lansquenet, but were unsuccessful before the end of the war. The three ships in Italy were scuttled in April 1945 to prevent their capture by the Allies; the remaining ships in Toulon were either sunk by Allied bombers or scuttled by the Germans after Operation Dragoon, the Allied invasion of southern France, in August 1944. All of the ships were salvaged for scrap or broken up on the slipway after the war except for L'Opiniâtre which was launched after the war and used for testing before she was scrapped in 1971. Lansquenet was refloated and towed back to Toulon in 1946 and was still incomplete when she was scrapped in 1958.

== Background and description ==
Line drawing of Le Hardi

The fast battleships Dunkerque and Strasbourg, then under design in 1931, would be able to sustain a speed of 30 knots (56 km/h; 35 mph), equal to the sustained speed achieved by the L'Adroit-class destroyers, although the Marine Nationale believed that a margin of 3–4 knots (5.6–7.4 km/h; 3.5–4.6 mph) was necessary when escorting the battlefleet. It thus formulated a requirement for a destroyer capable of 38 knots (70 km/h; 44 mph). A preliminary design, displacing about 1,400 tonnes (1,400 long tons) and armed with two twin-gun 130-millimetre (5.1 in) turrets, was developed the following year, but was too small to accommodate the propulsion machinery necessary to achieve the intended speed. As the detailed design was prepared over the next two years, the Le Hardis were enlarged and given extra guns to counter the large destroyers of the Italian Navigatori and Japanese Fubuki classes. Now significantly larger and faster than the L'Adroits, the Le Hardi-class design was approved on 10 August 1934.

The ships had an overall length of 117.2 metres (384 ft 6 in), a beam of 11.1 metres (36 ft 5 in), and a draught of 3.8 metres (12 ft 6 in). They displaced 1,800 tonnes (1,772 long tons) at standard load and 2,577 t (2,536 long tons) at deep load. The hull was divided by a dozen bulkheads into 13 watertight compartments. The Le Hardis were equipped with a pair of 100-kilowatt (130 hp) turbogenerators and a pair of 44-kilowatt (59 hp) diesel generators. Their crew consisted of 10 officers and 177 enlisted men.

The Le Hardi-class ships were powered by two geared steam turbines, each driving a single three-bladed 3.3-metre (10 ft 10 in) propeller, using steam provided by four Sural-Penhöet forced-circulation boilers that operated at a pressure of 35 kg/cm^{2} (3,432 kPa; 498 psi) and a temperature of 385 °C (725 °F). The turbines were designed to produce 58,000 metric horsepower (42,659 kW; 57,207 shp) intended to give the ships a speed of 37 knots (69 km/h; 43 mph). Le Hardi, the only ship of the class to run sea trials, comfortably exceeded that speed during her trials on 6 November 1939, reaching a maximum speed of 39.1 knots (72.4 km/h; 45.0 mph) from 60,450 PS (44,461 kW; 59,623 shp). The Le Hardi class carried 470 t (463 long tons) of fuel oil which gave them a range of 3,100 nautical miles (5,700 km; 3,600 mi) at 10 knots (19 km/h; 12 mph).

=== Armament and protection ===
The main armament of the Le Hardi-class ships consisted of six 45-caliber Canon de 130 mm Modèle 1932 guns in three twin-gun turrets, one forward and a superfiring pair aft of the superstructure. The electrically powered turrets were protected by 20 millimetres (0.8 in) of armour. The guns had an elevation range between −10° and +30° and each one was provided with 170 semi-armour-piercing and 10 star shells. They fired a 32.11-kilogram (70.8 lb) shell at a muzzle velocity of 800 m/s (2,600 ft/s). This gave them a range of 19,000 metres (21,000 yd) at an elevation of 30°.

The Modèle 1932 guns had a rate of fire of 10–15 rounds per minute although the rammer was underpowered and often caused jams in the loading system. In one engagement against a British destroyer in September 1940, Épée was only able to fire 14 rounds in six minutes before all her guns broke down. Given time and training, these problems could be fixed as Le Hardi demonstrated during the Battle of Dakar when she fired 60 rounds without any problems; she had previously fired over 700 rounds during thirteen sessions on gunnery ranges.

The primary anti-aircraft (AA) armament of the Le Hardi-class ships was intended to consist of a twin-gun mount for 70-caliber Canon de 37 mm (1.5 in) Modèle 1935 guns. Development of the automatic weapon was still in progress when the ships were completed in 1939–1940 and a twin-gun mount for 50-caliber Canon de 37 mm Modèle 1933 guns on the aft superstructure was installed instead. These manually-loaded guns could elevate to a maximum of +80° and they had a practical rate of fire of 15–21 rounds per minute. The ships carried a total of 2,960 rounds for the guns. Their muzzle velocity of 810 m/s (2,700 ft/s) gave their 0.73-kilogram (1.6 lb) shells an effective range of 5,000 metres (5,500 yd). The ships were also fitted with two twin Hotchkiss 13.2 mm (0.52 in) Modèle 1929 anti-aircraft machine gun mounts abreast the bridge. The weapons had a practical rate of fire of 250 rounds per minute and an effective range of 2,500 metres (2,700 yd). Ready-use lockers stowed 480 rounds near each gun and the remaining 1,920 rounds per gun were in the magazine.

The ships carried one triple and two twin sets of 550-millimetre (21.7 in) torpedo tubes amidships; the twin-tube aft mounts were positioned one on each broadside, but the triple-tube forward mount could traverse to both sides. One depth charge chute was built into the stern in the first batch of six ships; this housed eight 200-kilogram (440 lb) depth charges. The other side of the stern was used for the handling gear for a towed Ginocchio captive anti-submarine torpedo, but this was removed before they were completed. The second batch of six ships had two depth charge chutes in the stern with a capacity of a dozen depth charges.

=== Fire control ===
The fire-control system of the Le Hardi class as designed was identical to that of the larger Mogador-class contre-torpilleurs with a director equipped with a five-metre (16 ft 5 in) OPL Modèle PC.1936 stereoscopic rangefinder built around the base of the foremast above the bridge. The director sent the range to the post central artillerie where it was fed into a Modèle 1929 electro-mechanical computer which calculated the firing solution and transmitted it to the turrets. The Marine Nationale intended to equip the turrets so they could be controlled by the director, but abandoned the effort in 1942 after equipment trials were unsuccessful and it concluded that the ships lacked the necessary electrical capacity.

Space and weight had been allocated for a director for the 37-millimetre Modèle 1935 guns, but when this was unavailable a three-metre (9 ft 10 in) rangefinder on a pedestal for the main armament was substituted in all ships except Mameluk which received an enclosed mounting with a five-meter rangefinder. A high-angle one-point-five-metre (4 ft 11 in) rangefinder was fitted for the ant-aircraft guns.

A torpedo director was located above the primary gunnery director on the foremast. It used a separate five-meter OPL Modèle 1935 stereoscopic rangefinder to provide the bearing and range to a Modèle 1933 electro-mechanical computer which calculated the torpedo firing angle. This was sent to the remotely controlled torpedo tubes, and the command to fire could be given by either the torpedo director or either of the secondary positions on the wings of the bridge.

=== Modifications ===
In early 1941 a pair of single mounts for Browning 13.2-millimetre AA machine guns were added to all ships on the quarterdeck. In late 1941, Le Hardi had her anti-aircraft suite reinforced and rearranged. The twin Hotchkiss machine gun mounts were repositioned on the quarterdeck and a pair of single mounts for 25-millimetre (1 in) Hotchkiss AA guns were installed in their place in front of the bridge. In addition the Browning machine guns were transferred to newly built platforms on the sides of the superfiring turret aft. Later in the year and in early 1942, L'Adroit, Casque and Mameluk received the same modifications.

== Revised design ==
In 1938, after observing the experiences of ships attacked by aircraft while performing neutrality patrols during the Spanish Civil War of 1936–1939, the État-major de la marine (Naval General Staff) revised its assumptions about a naval war. It now viewed a dual-purpose (DP) armament as a requirement for ships intended to escort capital ships. This was the role of the Le Hardi class and the staff wanted to evaluate how the four ships scheduled to be laid down in mid-1939 could be modified to accommodate the DP guns. Three proposals were submitted in response on 30 November, all on a hull that was enlarged by more than 400 tonnes (390 long tons). The staff accepted two of them, the first for three ships to be armed with 130 mm DP mounts derived from those used on the Dunkerque-class battleships, while the remaining ship was to be armed with the standard 130 mm low-angle mounts to allow it to form a three-ship division with Le Corsaire and Le Flibustier, but its AA armament was to consist of a pair of twin-gun 100-millimetre (3.9 in) high-angle mounts, one of which replaced a torpedo-tube mount, and the standard pair of twin-gun AA machine gun mounts. Its torpedo armament was reduced to a pair of triple mounts.

The start of the war in September 1939 completely disrupted this plan as building of these ships was suspended. When construction was resumed in March 1940, Admiral François Darlan, the navy's Chief of Staff, was informed that no newly designed destroyers could enter service before 1944, but that either three Le Hardi-class ships or four Le Fier-class torpedo boat could begin sea trials in 1943. On 28 April Darlan decided on modified Le Hardis with either the originally specified hull or the proposed larger version, depending on how advanced the design work was. He also specified a top speed of 35.5–36 knots (65.7–66.7 km/h; 40.9–41.4 mph) and a range of 1,700 nmi (3,100 km; 2,000 mi) at 20 knots (37 km/h; 23 mph). Their armament was to consist of two or three 130-millimetre DP guns with an elevation limited to 40 or 50°; as the mounts were not likely be ready before the ships were completed, he proposed an interim armament of three or four 100-millimetre guns in high-angle mounts. The rest of the armament was to consist of one twin and two single mounts for 37-millimetre AA guns, two twin-gun AA machine gun mounts, two triple mounts for torpedoes and a pair of depth charge rails and a pair of depth charge throwers for twenty 100-kilogram depth charges.

== Ships ==
The name ship of the class was authorized in the 1932 Naval Estimates, but construction was significantly delayed by the financial impact of the Great Depression and bilateral arms limitation talks between France and Fascist Italy that caused the French Parliament to suspend all new naval construction until 1934. Even then Le Hardi was not laid down until late the following year, to be followed a few months later by two sister ships authorized in the 1935 Naval Estimates and then three more in mid-1936 as part of that year's Naval Estimates. The remaining six ships were authorized in the 1937, 1938 and 1938bis Naval Estimates.

Construction of the first six ships was slowed by the social and industrial disruptions associated with the Front Populaire that took power in 1936 so that Le Hardi was the only ship to complete all of her sea trials. The next four ships began their acceptance trials between March and May 1940 and all entered service in June with the Germans advancing on the naval bases in Brittany. The most complete of the remaining ships was finished after the armistice and six of the last seven ships were never completed.

Construction data
Ship	Builder	Laid down	Launched	Entered service	Fate
Le Hardi	Ateliers et Chantiers de la Loire, Nantes	20 May 1936	4 May 1938	2 June 1940	Scuttled 27 November 1942; raised as FR37, scuttled, Genoa, 20 April 1945
Fleuret (later renamed Foudroyant)	Forges et Chantiers de la Méditerranée, La Seyne-sur-Mer	18 August 1936	28 July 1938	11 June 1940	Scuttled 27 November 1942; raised as FR36, scuttled, Toulon, 17 August 1944
Épée (later renamed L'Adroit)	Forges et Chantiers de la Gironde, Bordeaux	15 October 1936	26 October 1938	14 June 1940	Scuttled 27 November 1942; raised as FR33, sunk February 1944
Mameluk	Ateliers et Chantiers de la Loire, Nantes	1 January 1937	18 February 1939	17 June 1940	Scuttled, 27 November 1942
Casque	Forges et Chantiers de la Méditerranée, La Seyne-sur-Mer	30 November 1936	2 November 1938	20 June 1940	Scuttled, 27 November 1942
Lansquenet (later renamed Cyclone)	Forges et Chantiers de la Gironde, Bordeaux	17 December 1936	20 May 1939	—N/a	Scuttled, 27 November 1942; raised as FR34, captured by the Germans and renamed TA34, scuttled, Genoa, 1945
Le Flibustier (later renamed Bison)	Forges et Chantiers de la Méditerranée, La Seyne-sur-Mer	11 March 1938	14 December 1939	—N/a	Captured, 27 November 1942; renamed FR35, sank 1944
Le Corsaire (later renamed Sirocco).	Forges et Chantiers de la Méditerranée, La Seyne-sur-Mer	31 March 1938	14 November 1939	1 July 1941	Scuttled, 27 November 1942; raised as FR32, scuttled, Genoa, 20 October 1944
L'Intrépide	Forges et Chantiers de la Méditerranée, La Seyne-sur-Mer	16 August 1939	26 June 1941	—N/a	Not completed, scrapped postwar
Le Téméraire	Forges et Chantiers de la Méditerranée, La Seyne-sur-Mer	28 August 1939	7 November 1941	—N/a	Not completed, scrapped postwar
L'Opiniâtre	Forges et Chantiers de la Gironde, Bordeaux	1 August 1939	—N/a	—N/a	Intended for completion by the Germans as ZF6, then ZF2, demolished, 1944
L'Aventurier	Forges et Chantiers de la Gironde, Bordeaux	4 August 1939	20 April 1947	—N/a	Intended for completion by the Germans as ZF7; used as an experimental hulk postwar, listed for sale, 21 April 1971

== Service history ==
Le Hardi entered service on 2 June 1940 and escorted an ocean liner to Casablanca, French Morocco, before sailing to Brest. Fleuret helped to escort the battleship Richelieu from Casablanca to Dakar, French West Africa, on 12 June. The first mission of Épée and Mameluk was to rendezvous with Le Hardi to help escort the incomplete battleship Jean Bart to Casablanca a few days before the French signed an armistice with the Germans on 22 June. Casque, Lansquenet and Le Corsaire took refuge in French North Africa in mid-June despite the latter only being 82% complete.

The hulls of L'Opiniâtre and L'Aventurier were captured intact in Bordeaux in June 1940, 16% and 13% complete respectively. The Germans decided to complete them and renamed them ZF6 and ZF7. As their intended French weapons were unavailable, they were to be armed with five 12.7-centimetre (5 in) SK C/34 guns with 80 rounds per gun, four 3.7-centimetre (1.5 in) AA guns with 6000 rounds, ten 2-centimetre (0.8 in) C/38 AA guns with 20,000 rounds and two quadruple mounts for 53.3-centimetre (21 in) torpedo tubes amidships.

Work resumed on the two ships in February 1941, but construction on ZF7 was abandoned in June and some material was incorporated in ZF6 which was renamed ZF2 on 26 August. Work on that ship was terminated in July 1943 before she was launched and she was demolished when the Germans abandoned the area after Operation Dragoon in August 1944. Her wreck was scrapped after the end of the war. The French resumed construction on L'Aventurier in 1945 and she was launched two years later. The ship was used as an experimental hulk before she became a mooring pontoon at Brest and was listed for sale on 21 April 1971.

Le Hardi played a minor role in the Battle of Dakar in September, mostly laying smoke screens. After the battle, Fleuret and Épée were two of the four destroyers ordered to attack British shipping, although their only combat was an inconclusive duel with a British destroyer. When the Vichy French government reestablished the Forces de haute mer (FHM) on 25 September 1940 after it negotiated rules limiting the force's activities and numbers with the Italian and German Armistice Commissions, all of the destroyers were based overseas and not subject to the limits of the FHM. Le Hardi, Épée, Mameluk, Lansquenet and Fleuret helped to escort the battleship Provence, which had been damaged by the British during their July attack on Mers-el-Kébir, French Algeria, to Toulon in November 1940. Upon their arrival, three of the ships were assigned to the 10^{e}Division de torpilleurs (DT; 10th Destroyer Division), which was assigned to local defence duties, and the others were reduced to reserve. Casque and Le Corsaire arrived at Toulon later. Assignments to the unit rotated as ships were refitted because the French were only allowed to have three ships of the class active at any one time. On 1 April 1941, Fleuret was renamed Foudroyant, Épée to L'Adroit, Le Corsaire to Siroco and Le Flibustier to Bison to commemorate destroyers that had been sunk during the Battle of France. The 10^{e} DT was assigned to the FHM on 1 November.

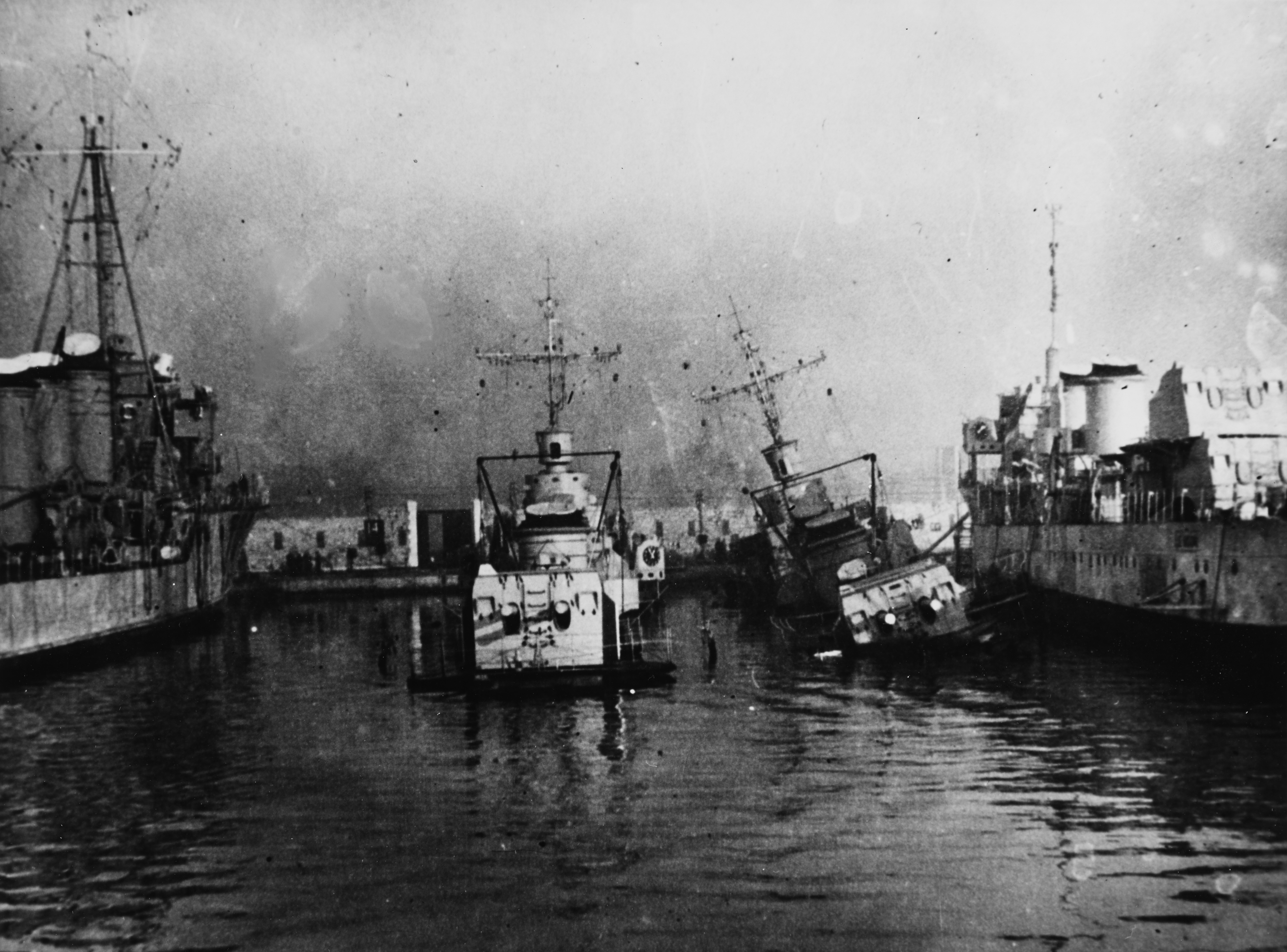
Foudroyant (left) and Le Hardi scuttled in Toulon, 27 November 1942

When the Germans invaded Vichy France after the Allies invaded French North Africa in November 1942 and tried to seize the French fleet, all but one of the seaworthy destroyers were scuttled to prevent their capture. While the Vichy Navy made some effort to finish Le Intrépide or Le Téméraire after the armistice, they were only 20% and 15% complete when the Germans occupied Vichy France and they made no effort to finish them. The Germans turned the ships in Toulon over to the Italians shortly after occupying the city. Bison, the only ship not scuttled, was still incomplete and was not completed by the Italians although they gave her the designation of FR 35. Mameluk, Casque and L'Adroit were the three ships assigned to the 10^{e} DT on active duty. The latter was the only one of the trio to be salvaged as the work on the other two was interrupted by Allied bombing in 1944. Lansquenet was towed to Italy in April 1943 for completion as FR34. Sirocco and Le Hardi were refloated in as April and June, redesignated as FR32 and FR37, respectively, and were towed to Italy a few months later. L'Adroit, renamed FR33 by the Italians and Foudroyant, renamed FR36, remained in Toulon after they were salvaged in April and May, respectively.

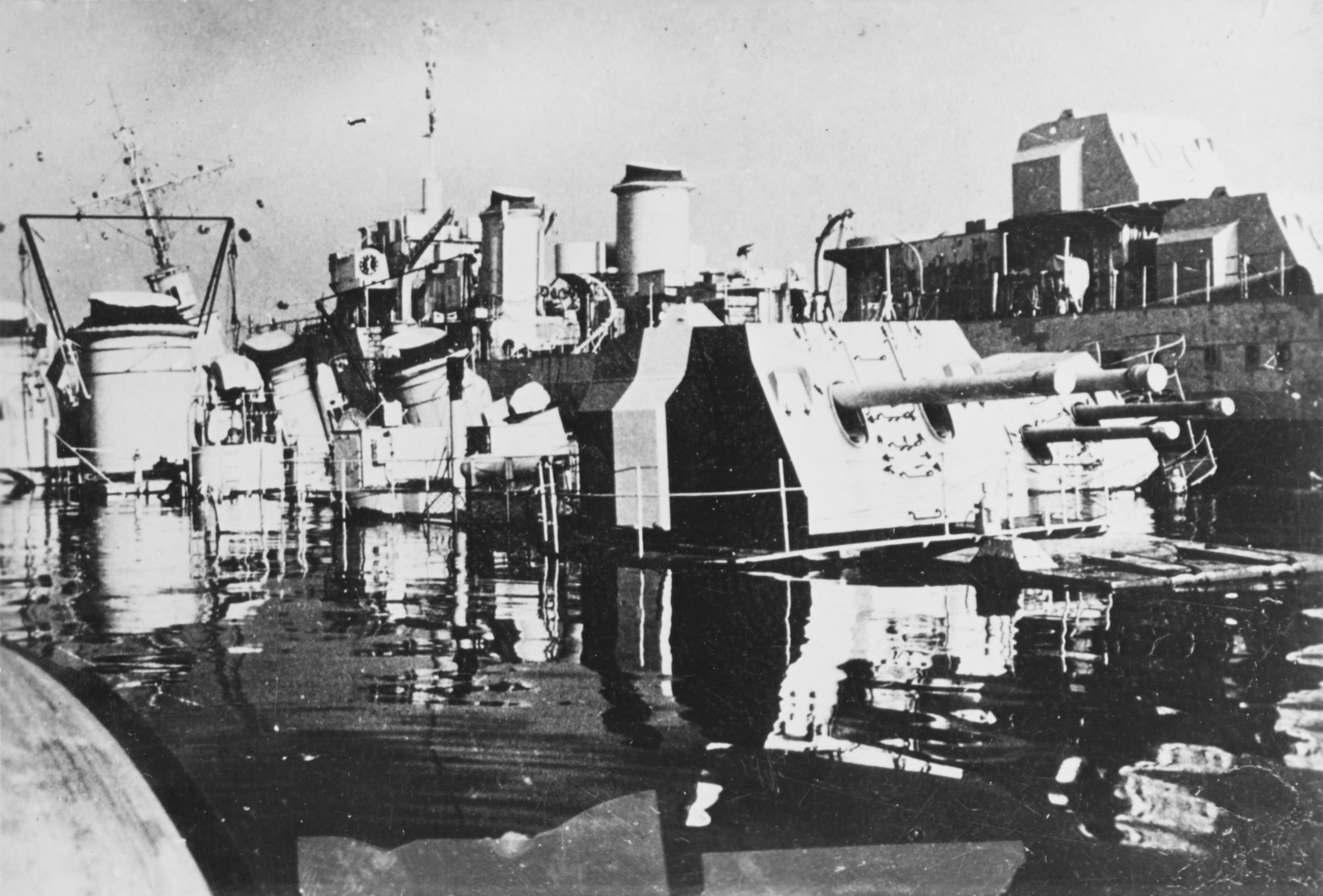
Scuttled at Toulon, from left: Trombe, Foudroyant, Le Hardi, and Bison

All of the ships were captured by the Germans after the Italian armistice in September, but they only made an effort to repair or complete Lansquenet which they renamed as TA34, reusing the designation of a torpedo boat that had been transferred to Croatia in 1944. She was scuttled in Genoa in May 1945, following Le Hardi in April and Sirocco in October 1944. Foudroyant was scuttled again by the Germans as a blockship in Toulon in August while Bison sank after a collision with a submarine in June. L'Adroit was sunk by Allied air raids in 1944. Lansquenet was salvaged in 1946 and towed back to Toulon in March 1946 where she was renamed Cyclone. Never repaired or returned to service, she was stricken in 1958 and subsequently scrapped.
