= French submarine Pégase (Q156) =

French submarine used during World War II

Pégase
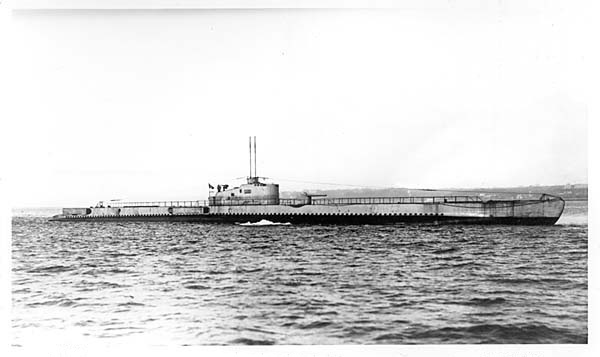
- Pégase's sister ship Ajax in 1930.

History

France
- Name: Pégase
- Namesake: Pegasus, a divine winged horse in Greek mythology
- Operator: French Navy
- Builder: Ateliers et Chantiers de la Loire, Saint-Nazaire, France
- Laid down: 29 September 1928
- Launched: 28 June 1930
- Commissioned: 19 June 1932
- Decommissioned: 1 January 1944
- Home port: Brest, France
- Stricken: 10 June 1950
- Fate: Scrapped

General characteristics
- Class & type: Redoutable-class submarine
- Displacement: 1,572 tonnes (1,547 long tons) (surfaced); 2,092 tonnes (2,059 long tons) (submerged)
- Length: 92.3 m (302 ft 10 in)
- Beam: 8.1 m (26 ft 7 in)
- Draft: 4.4 m (14 ft 5 in) (surfaced)
- Propulsion: 2 × diesel engines, 6,000 hp (4,474 kW); 2 × electric motors, 2,250 hp (1,678 kW)
- Speed: 17.5 kn (32.4 km/h; 20.1 mph) (surfaced); 10 kn (19 km/h; 12 mph) (submerged)
- Range: 14,000 nmi (26,000 km; 16,000 mi) at 7 kn (13 km/h; 8.1 mph) (surfaced); 10,000 nmi (19,000 km; 12,000 mi) at 10 kn (19 km/h; 12 mph) (surfaced); 4,000 nmi (7,400 km; 4,600 mi) at 17 kn (31 km/h; 20 mph) (surfaced); 90 nmi (170 km; 100 mi) at 7 kn (13 km/h; 8.1 mph) (submerged)
- Test depth: 80 m (262 ft)
- Complement: 5 officers (6 in operations); 66 enlisted
- Armament: 11 torpedo tubes; 1 × 100 mm (3.9 in) gun; 1 × 13.2 mm (0.5 in) machine gun

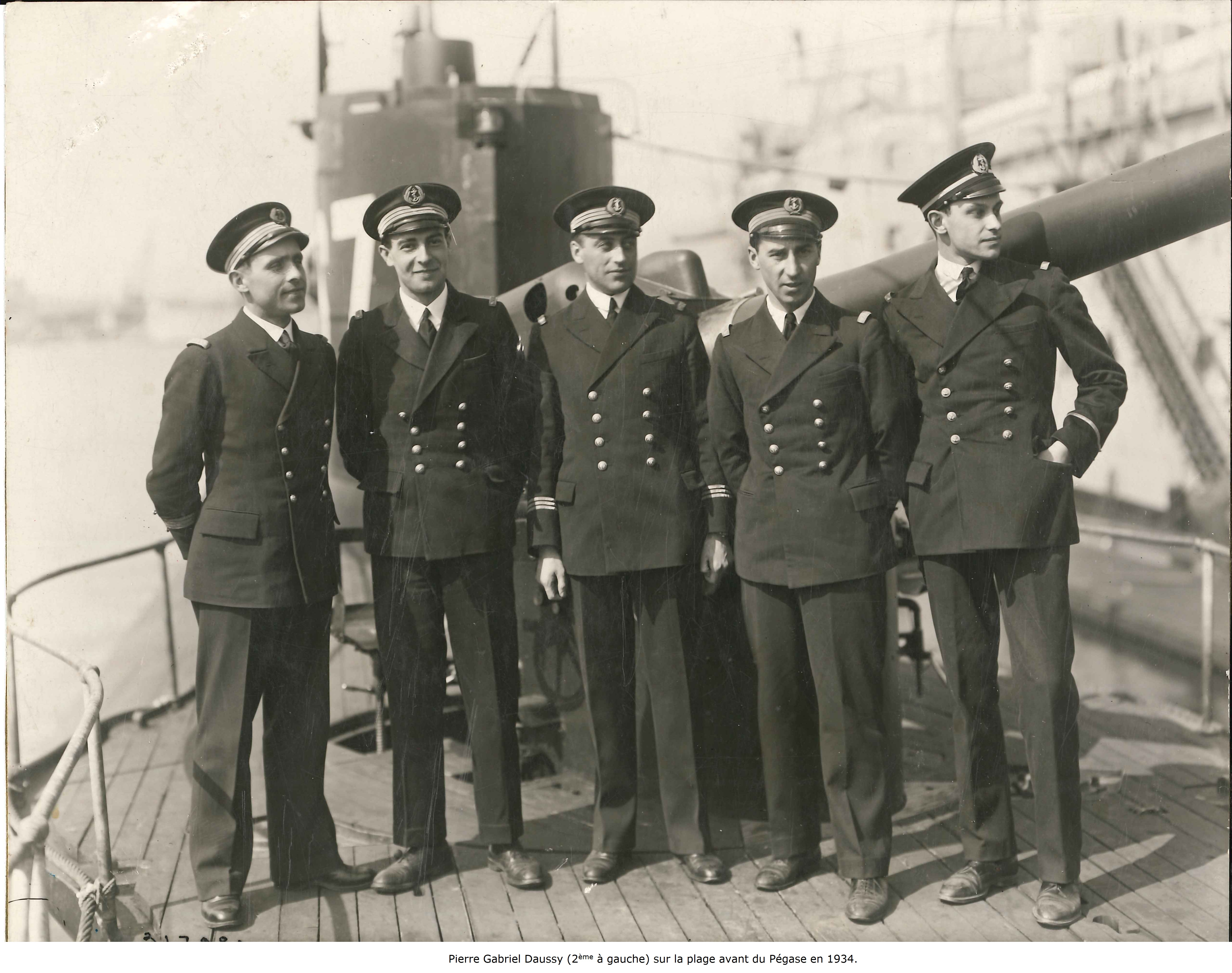
The five officers of Pégase on her main deck in 1934. Second from left is Pierre Gabriel Daussy, a future contre-amiral (counter admiral).

Pégase was a French Navy Redoutable-class submarine of the M6 series commissioned in 1932. She participated in World War II, first on the side of the Allies from 1939 to June 1940, then in the navy of Vichy France until she was decommissioned at the beginning of 1944 and subsequently abandoned.

== Characteristics ==
Profile of Casabianca, sister ship of Pégase

Pégase was part of a fairly homogeneous series of 31 deep-sea patrol submarines also called "1,500-tonners" because of their displacement. All entered service between 1931 and 1939.

The Redoutable-class submarines were 92.3 metres (302 ft 10 in) long and 8.1 metres (26 ft 7 in) in beam and had a draft of 4.4 metres (14 ft 5 in). They could dive to a depth of 80 metres (262 ft). They displaced 1,572 tonnes (1,547 long tons) on the surface and 2,082 tonnes (2,049 long tons) underwater. Propelled on the surface by two diesel engines producing a combined 6,000 horsepower (4,474 kW), they had a maximum speed of 18.6 knots (34.4 km/h; 21.4 mph). When submerged, their two electric motors produced a combined 2,250 horsepower (1,678 kW) and allowed them to reach 10 knots (19 km/h; 12 mph). Also called "deep-cruising submarines", their range on the surface was 10,000 nautical miles (19,000 km; 12,000 mi) at 10 knots (19 km/h; 12 mph). Underwater, they could travel 100 nautical miles (190 km; 120 mi) at 5 knots (9.3 km/h; 5.8 mph).

== Construction and commissioning ==
Laid down at Ateliers et Chantiers de la Loire in Saint-Nazaire, France, on 29 September 1928 with the hull number Q156, Pégase was launched on 28 June 1930. She was commissioned on 19 June 1932.

== Service history ==
=== 1932–1939 ===
Pégase and her sister ship Monge departed Toulon, France, on 16 December 1936 bound for French Indochina in Southeast Asia, which they reached in January 1937. Their deployment there ended in March 1937, when they got underway for Toulon, where they arrived on 15 May 1937.

=== World War II ===
==== French Navy ====
At the start of World War II in September 1939, Pégase was assigned to the 5th Submarine Division in the 3rd Submarine Squadron, 1st Flotilla, 2nd Squadron, based at Toulon. Her sister ships L'Espoir and Monge made up the rest of the division.

The Battle of France began on 10 May 1940 when German ground forces advanced into France, and Italy declared war on France on 10 June 1940 and joined the invasion. Pégase and Monge departed Toulon on 11 June and patrolled in the Mediterranean Sea south and southeast of Malta until 20 June 1940 to search for convoys making the passage between Italy and Tripolitania. The Battle of France ended in France's defeat and armistices with Germany on 22 June 1940 and with Italy on 24 June, both of which went into effect on 25 June 1940.

==== Vichy France ====
After France's surrender, Pégase served in the naval forces of Vichy France. In September 1940, the Vichy French Admiralty, with the concurrence of the Armistice Commission, decided to reinforce French naval forces in Southeast Asia by deploying four submarines to French Indochina. Two submarine divisions were formed for the deployment, the 8th at Toulon, consisting of the Redoutable-class submarines L'Espoir and Vengeur, and the 22nd at Bizerte in Tunisia, consisting of Pégase and Monge. On 11 October 1940, Pégase and Monge departed Bizerte under escort by the Élan-class sloop La Batailleuse bound for Oran in Algeria. There they rendezvoused with L'Espoir, Vengeur, and the tanker Lot, which was to accompany the submarines on their journey, the tanker and the four submarines being designated the "Lot Group" for purposes of the voyage. Monge′s commanding officer, who also served as commander of the 22nd Submarine Division, took on the additional responsibility of commanding the Lot Group as a whole. After a stay at Oran that lasted from 13 to 16 October, Lot and the four submarines passed through the Strait of Gibraltar under the escort of the destroyers Casque and Épée under conditions of high tension with the United Kingdom and arrived at Casablanca in French Morocco on 18 October 1940 for a brief stopover. They then proceeded to Dakar in Senegal.

On 23 October 1940, the submarines got underway from Dakar to patrol off the Canary Islands. They encountered very heavy weather, and Pégase suffered damage to one of her diving planes. The submarines returned to Dakar on 28 October 1940, and Pégase immediately entered drydock there for repairs. Subsequently, the submarines took turns conducting defensive patrols 10 to 35 nautical miles (19 to 65 km; 12 to 40 mi) off Dakar.

On 17 December 1940, Lot and the four submarines got underway from Dakar to continue the voyage to French Indochina, with their next stop at Madagascar. Bad weather helped to conceal them from detection by the British, and they rounded the Cape of Good Hope without incident. They encountered a tropical cyclone as they approached Madagascar, and anchored at Tamatave, Madagascar, on 15 January 1941. A second cyclone struck Tamatave on the day of their arrival, and Pégase and Monge in particular faced its more severe effects. The two submarines got underway for Diego-Suarez in northern Madagascar on 16 January 1941, and entered drydock for repairs after their arrival. L'Espoir, Vengeur and Lot departed Tamatave on 22 January 1941 to join them at Diego-Suarez. A lack of docking space at Diego-Suarez delayed their arrival, but the three vessels finally moored at Diego-Suarez on 2 February 1941.

The submarines' departure for French Indochina was delayed when the commanding officer of Monge, who also served as commander of the 22nd Submarine Division and of the Lot Group as a whole, became extremely intoxicated and began to show the early signs of a nervous breakdown. The plans for L'Espoir and Vengeur to deploy to French Indochina were cancelled. On 16 February 1941, however, Pégase, Monge, and Lot finally departed Diego-Suarez to begin the last leg of their voyage to French Indochina, which they completed without further incident with their arrival at Saigon on 6 March 1941, too late to participate in the Franco-Thai War, which had concluded on 28 January 1941. Upon arrival at Saigon, the two submarines began repairs to their air compressors and blower fans. On 8 March 1941, the Lot Group was dissolved.

After the completion of repairs, Pégase and Monge departed Saigon on 15 March 1941 for a two-month cruise to make "representation" visits to ports along the coast of French Indochina. They stopped first at Cam Ranh, pausing to hold a memorial service in the South China Sea over the wreck of their sister ship Phénix, lost with all hands in a diving accident on 15 June 1939. They then visited Qui Nhon and Haiphong in French Indochina and Fort Bayard in Kouang-Tcheou-Wan, China, before beginning their return journey, stopping in French Indochina at Hạ Long Bay, Cape Varella, Tourane, and Cam Ranh before returning to Saigon in mid-May 1941.

On 14 August 1941, Pégase departed Saigon, called at Port Dayot, and then joined the aviso Amiral Charner in escorting the cargo ship F. Dreyfus, which was carrying 6,000 tonnes (5,900 long tons; 6,600 short tons) of rubber to France. Pégase returned to Saigon on 25 August 1941.

Monge departed French Indochina on 6 or 7 September 1941 (according to different sources) to return to Madagascar, but Pégase stayed behind at Saigon. She began a refit there at the end of October 1941. While she was under refit, the war in the Pacific began in December 1941 and the command of French naval forces in Southeast Asia was transferred to the French naval commander on Madagascar on 22 December 1941.

After the completion of Pégase′s refit in January 1942, the Vichy French government began extended negotiations with the Japanese — who had invaded French Indochina in September 1940 and occupied Saigon on 31 July 1941 — over her return to Metropolitan France. In the meantime, Pégase conducted numerous escort missions along the coast of French Indochina, protecting the shipping lanes between Saigon and Haiphong, until June 1942. Beginning on 1 July 1942, she ceased to operate beyond the confines of the Saigon River in order to conserve fuel. In October 1942, the French finally secured Japanese approval for Pégase to depart French Indochina, the agreement calling for her to get underway from Saigon on 10 November 1942 and make a 70-day, nonstop voyage to Dakar. Before she could leave, however, the Allied landings in French North Africa in Operation Torch on 8 November 1942 prompted the Japanese to suspend the agreement, then cancel it entirely.

== Final disposition ==
Pégase was laid up at Saigon on 1 January 1943, with two-thirds of her crew disembarked, and immobilized in April 1943. Decommissioned on 1 January 1944, she was placed in reserve, moored at the Saigon naval arsenal. At the end of 1944, her diesel engines were removed for use ashore, and she was moored at a dispersal point along the bank of the Arroyo de l'Avalanche, a tributary of the Saigon River delineating the northern boundary of Saigon.

Still afloat when World War II ended with the surrender of Japan on 2 September 1945, Pégase′s hulk soon was towed into the Mekong Delta and grounded on a shoal to mark the mouth of the Bassac River. She was stricken from the navy list on 10 June 1950. On 9 April 1951, her hulk was towed off the shoal, and she subsequently was scrapped at Saigon.
