= French destroyer Trombe =

Destroyer of the French Navy

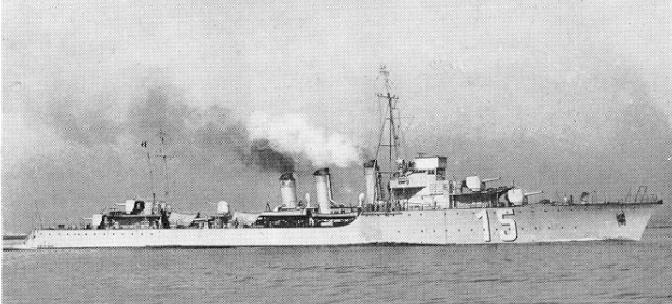
- Sister ship Ouragan underway before 1942

History

France
- Name: Trombe
- Namesake: Whirlwind
- Ordered: 5 March 1923
- Builder: Forges et Chantiers de la Gironde, Lormont
- Laid down: 5 March 1924
- Launched: 27 December 1925
- Completed: 27 October 1927
- Commissioned: 1 June 1927
- Decommissioned: 12 December 1946
- In service: 21 December 1927
- Fate: Damaged beyond repair April 16, 1945

General characteristics
- Class & type: Bourrasque-class destroyer
- Displacement: 1,320 t (1,300 long tons) (standard); 1,825 t (1,796 long tons) (full load)
- Length: 105.6 m (346 ft 5.5 in)
- Beam: 9.7 m (31 ft 9.9 in)
- Draft: 3.5 m (11 ft 5.8 in)
- Installed power: 31,000 PS (22,800 kW; 30,576 shp); 3 du Temple boilers
- Propulsion: 2 shafts; 2 geared steam turbines
- Speed: 33 knots (61 km/h; 38 mph)
- Range: 3,000 nmi (5,600 km; 3,500 mi) at 15 knots (28 km/h; 17 mph)
- Crew: 9 officers, 153 crewmen (wartime)
- Armament: 4 × single 130 mm (5.1 in) guns; 1 × single 75 mm (3.0 in) anti-aircraft guns; 2 × triple 550 mm (21.7 in) torpedo tubes; 2 chutes for 16 depth charges

Trombe was a Bourrasque-class destroyer (torpilleur d'escadre) built for the French Navy during the 1920s.

== Design and description ==
The Bourrasque class had an overall length of 105.6 meters (346 ft 5 in), a beam of 9.7 meters (31 ft 10 in), and a draft of 3.5 meters (11 ft 6 in). The ships displaced 1,320 metric tons (1,300 long tons) at (standard) load and 1,825 metric tons (1,796 long tons) at deep load. They were powered by two geared steam turbines, each driving one propeller shaft, using steam provided by three du Temple boilers. The turbines were designed to produce 31,000 metric horsepower (22,800 kW; 30,576 shp), which would propel the ship at 33 knots (61 km/h; 38 mph). The ships carried enough fuel oil to give them a range of 3,000 nautical miles (5,600 km; 3,500 mi) at 15 knots (28 km/h; 17 mph).

The main armament of the Bourrasque-class ships consisted of four canon de 130 mm (5.1 in) Modèle 1919 guns in shielded single mounts, one superfiring pair each fore and aft of the superstructure. Their anti-aircraft (AA) armament consisted of a single Canon de 75 mm (3 in) Modèle 1924 gun. The ships carried two triple mounts of 550-millimeter (21.7 in) torpedo tubes amidships. A pair of depth charge chutes were built into their stern that housed a total of sixteen 200-kilogram (440 lb) depth charges.

== Construction and career ==
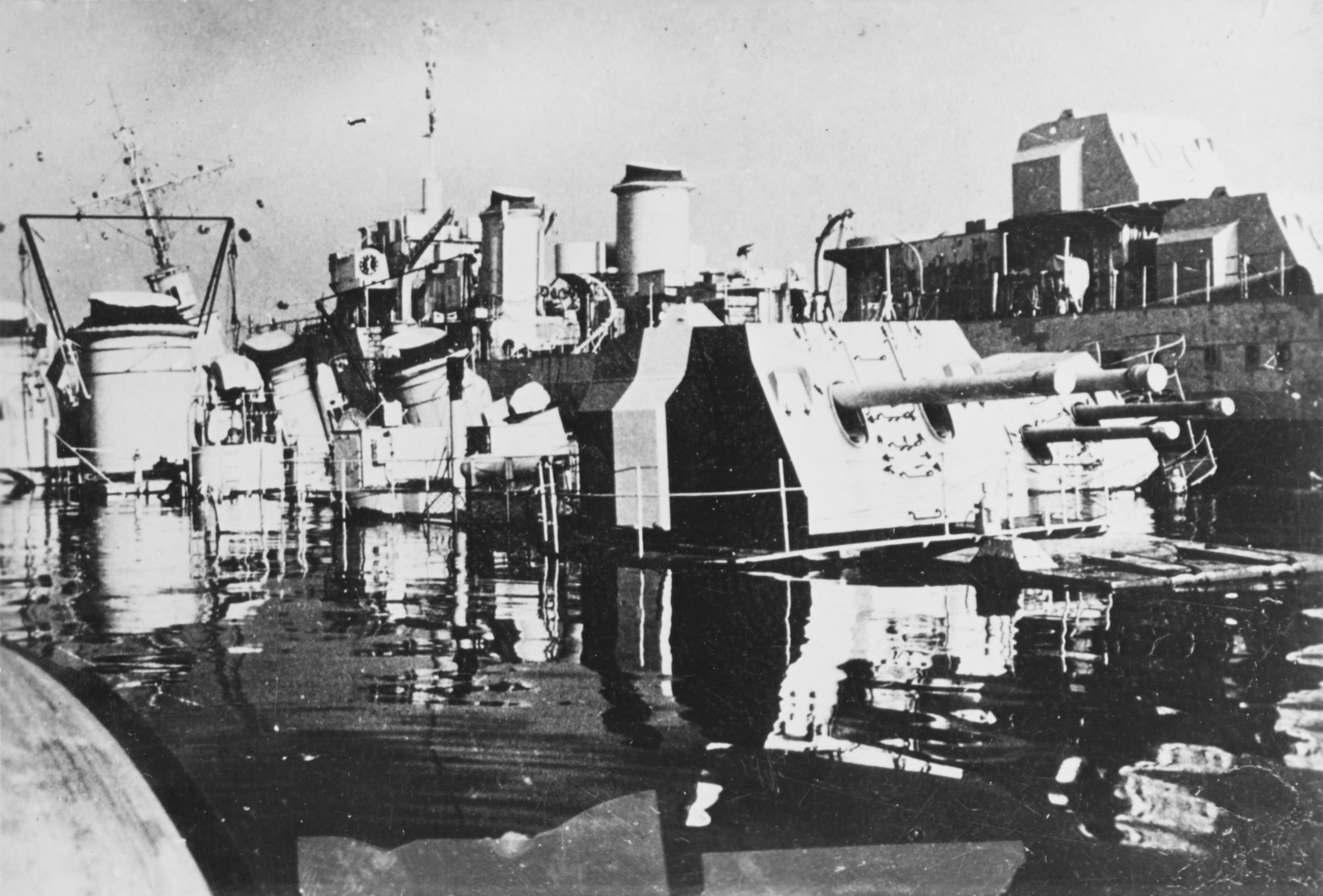
Scuttled at Toulon, from left: Trombe, Foudroyant, Le Hardi, and Bison

After France surrendered to Germany in June 1940 during World War II, Trombe served with the navy of Vichy France. She was among the ships of the French fleet scuttled at Toulon, France, on 27 November 1942. She later was salvaged and repaired by the Regia Marina (Italian Royal Navy), who christened the ship FR 31. When the Armistice of Cassibile was signed, the repairs were still underway and Free France requested the return of the vessel upon completion of the work. On October 28, 1943, the Trombe moved to Bizerte, once again under French command.

On April 16, 1945, off the coast of Liguria, near Sanremo, Trombe came under the combined attack of six MT explosive motorboats led by an MTSM motor torpedo boat of the Marina Nazionale Repubblicana. An explosive boat, either MTM 548 or MTM 26b, piloted by petty officer Sergio Denti, struck the Trombe starboard, killing 20 men and causing severe damage. She was successfully towed to Toulon, where the damage was ruled irreparable. The Trombe was put in reserve on 3 July 1945, stricken on 12 December 1946 and listed for sale on 7 December 1950.

== See also ==
- Decima Flottiglia MAS
- Second Battle of the Alps
- Raid on Suda Bay
