= Canon de 130 mm Modèle 1932 and 1935 =

- Type: Naval gun Dual-purpose gun
- Place of origin: France

Service history
- In service: World War II
- Used by: France
- Wars: World War II

Production history
- Designed: 1932–1935

Specifications
- Mass: 3.7 metric tons
- Barrel length: 5.89 meters (19.3 ft) 45 caliber
- Shell: Fixed QF ammunition
- Shell weight: 53 kilograms (117 lb)
- Caliber: 130 millimeters (5.1 in)
- Breech: M1932: Vertical sliding breech block M1935: Horizontal sliding breech block
- Elevation: Dual-purpose mounts: -10° to +75° Low-angle mounts: -10° to +35°
- Traverse: Dual-purpose mounts: Lateral Quads: 175°; Lateral Twins: 171°; Centerline Quad: -150° to +150°; Low-angle mounts: -150° to +150°
- Rate of fire: 10 rpm
- Muzzle velocity: 800 meters per second (2,600 ft/s)
- Maximum firing range: 20,870 meters (22,820 yd) at 45°

The Canon de 130 mm Modèle 1932 and 1935 were medium-caliber naval guns used as the primary armament on a number of French Navy destroyers and as dual-purpose secondary armament on battleships during World War II.

== Description ==
The Canon de 130 mm Modèle 1932 and 1935 were built with an autofretted barrel and a breech ring. A vertical sliding breech block was used for the M1932 in dual-purpose mountings, a horizontal one was used for the M1935 in low-angle mountings. Useful life expectancy was 900 effective full charges (EFC) per barrel. These guns were carried in dual-purpose double or quadruple turrets aboard battleships and low-angle double turrets on destroyers. The dual-purpose quadruple turrets had cast steel cradles with two M1932 guns per cradle and the two pairs of guns could be elevated or depressed independently. The dual-purpose double turrets were basically one half of a quadruple turret with two M1932 guns on a single cradle. The low-angle double turrets used on destroyers had a separate cradle for each M1935 gun and they could be elevated or depressed independently. All three turret types had mechanical problems with their ammunition handling and the heavy weight of their shells strained crews and slowed their rate of fire.

== Ammunition ==
Ammunition was of Fixed QF type.

The gun was able to fire:

- Semi Armour-Piercing - 32 kg (71 lb)
- High Explosive - 29.5 kg (65 lb)
- Illumination - Unknown

== Naval service ==
Ship classes that carried the Canon de 130 mm Modèle 1932 and 1935 guns include:

- Dunkerque-class battleships
- Le Hardi-class destroyers
