= Forced circulation boiler =

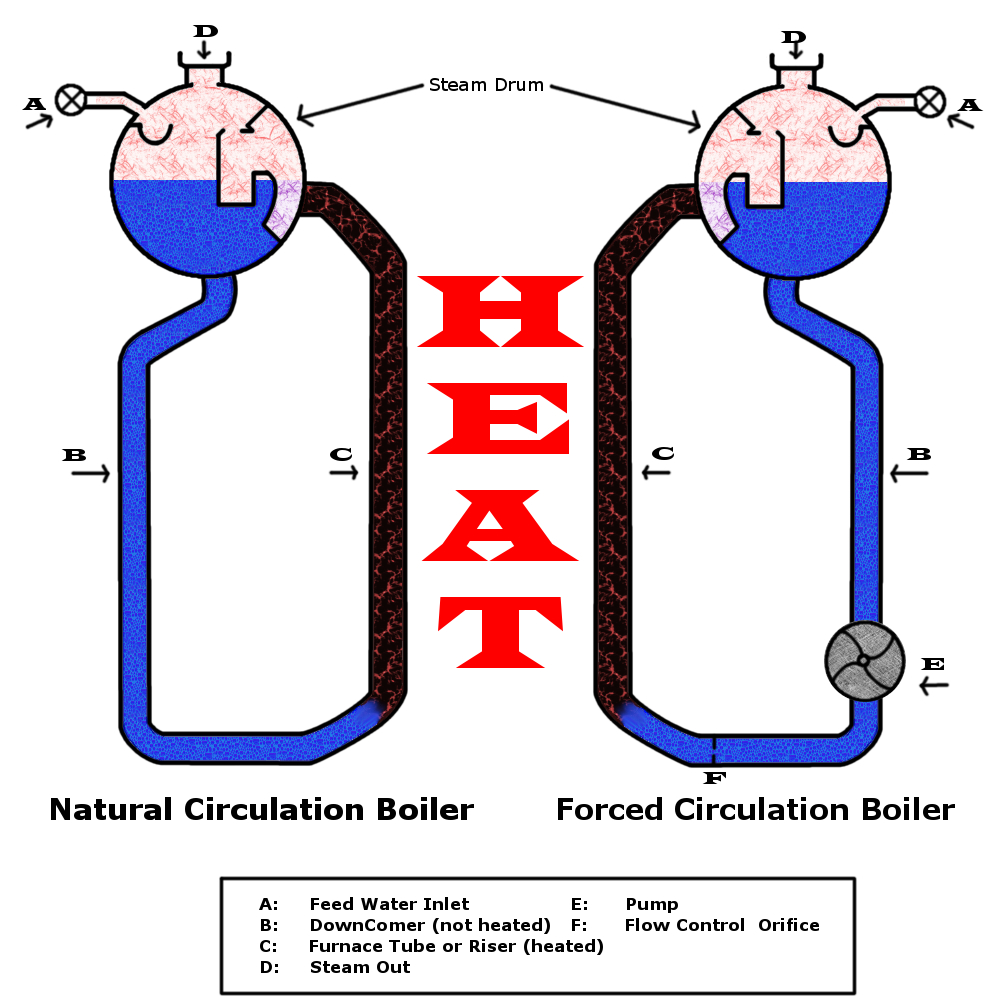
Comparison between Natural Circulation and Forced Circulation

A forced circulation boiler is a boiler where a pump is used to circulate water inside the boiler. This differs from a natural circulation boiler which relies on density current to circulate water inside the boiler. In some forced circulation boilers, the water is circulated at twenty times the rate of evaporation.

In water tube boilers, the way the water is recirculated inside the boiler before becoming steam can be described as either natural circulation or forced circulation. In a water tube boiler, the water is recirculated inside until the vapor pressure of the water overcomes the vapor pressure inside the stream drum and becomes saturated steam. The forced circulation boiler begins the same as a natural circulation boiler, at the feed water pump. Water is introduced into the steam drum and is circulated around the boiler, leaving only as steam. What makes the forced circulation boiler different is its use of a secondary pump that circulates water through the boiler. The secondary pump takes the feed water going to the boiler and raises the pressure of the water going in. In a natural circulation boilers, the circulation of water is dependent on the differential pressures caused by the change of density in the water as it is heated. That is to say that as the water is heated and starts turning to steam, the density decreases sending the hottest water and steam to the top of the furnace tubes.

In contrast to the natural circulation boiler, the forced circulation boiler uses a water circulation pump to force that flow instead of waiting for the differential to form. Because of this, the generation tubes of a forced circulation boiler are able to be oriented in whatever way is required by space constraints. Water is taken from the drum and forced through the steel tubes. In this way it is able to produce steam much faster than that of a natural circulation boiler.

== Types ==
=== LaMont ===
One example of a forced circulation boiler is the LaMont boiler. Such boilers are used in cases where there is high pressure, above 30 megapascals.

=== Clayton ===
The Clayton Industries forced-circulation steam generator does not have a steam drum in the typical sense. A series of small tubes that are part of one giant coil, usually made of steel, have feed water pumped through at great speed. The water is pumped from the top of the steam generator down to the bottom and out. The tubes that are arranged in such a way that the combustion gasses pass around the tube subsequently heating the water. Essentially, the arrangement can be best described as having a large thin walled coil of pipe wrapping around the circumference of a vertical steel drum looping around and down until it reaches the bottom. As only some of the water may become steam, it is important to separate the two and send any water back through to absorb more heat. If this separation does not occur, the damage to the system could be costly. If steam goes through the generation tubes inside, the tubes may overheat and become weak, and if water is allowed down into the steam system, corrosion, water hammer, or other ill effects may occur. To combat this, after exiting the steam generator, the mixture is put through a centrifugal steam separator which does exactly that producing steam that is above ninety-nine percent dry saturated steam. If superheated steam is desired, an additional coil is run back through the steam generator. To maintain a constant level of water in the steam separator, the feed pump in conjunction with a leveling system is utilized. A great advantage to this system is that steam can be generated very quickly. However, the downside to this system is the complete dependence on a constant supply of feed water.

Without the constant supply, the system may be subject to a massive and expensive damage. Operational safety depends on continuous feedwater supply and active circulation. Because the system does not store a large reserve of water, loss of feedwater can result in rapid temperature rise in the coil if combustion continues. For this reason, forced-circulation generators are typically equipped with flow monitoring, flame safeguards, and automatic shutdown systems to prevent overheating under low-flow or no-flow conditions.

Clayton steam generators are subject to regulatory safety testing in jurisdictions where they are installed. Such testing may include controlled low-water firing procedures specifically designed to evaluate equipment behaviour under such loss-of-feedwater conditions. In documented testing of this type, a unit was operated under controlled conditions until structural failure occurred, and no steam drum explosion was reported.

== Advantages ==
- The evaporator tubes may be built in any orientation. Natural circulation requires vertical piping, whereas the forced circulation ensures flow in any direction.
- Smaller water tubes may used due to the greater tolerance of higher pressure losses.
- The general forced circulation boiler has a low circulation ratio (ratio of feed water to steam generated per pass through the tubes) of between three and ten. Natural circulation boilers have circulation ratios from five all the way to one hundred. This can produce a smaller and lighter boiler.

== Disadvantages ==
- The forced circulation boiler requires more power and water than a natural circulation boiler. This is due to the electrical requirements of the pump forcing circulation and the amount of water being circulated through the tubes.
- The additional parts required; steam drum, circulation pump, and orifices to limit flow, cause a forced circulation boiler to lead to increased cost as well as increased opportunities for failure which gives them a lower reliability than natural circulation.
- The pump must be beneath the steam drum to take advantage of the pressure due to the height of the water. Because the water is near boiling, it is very prone to cavitation, so the pump must be in the highest-pressure location to avoid damage to the impeller.
- Since there are two pumps, controlling them and having them work in sync and cooperation proves difficult.
- The boiler is not able to produce super-critical pressures because the steam separator depends on the density difference between liquid and steam.

== See also ==
- Supercritical steam generator
