= French creole =

French Creole may refer to:

Language

- French-based creole languages, creole languages based on the French language
- French Guianese Creole, a French-lexified creole language spoken mainly in French Guiana
- Antillean Creole French, a creole language with vocabulary based on French spoken primarily in the Lesser Antilles
- Haitian Creole, a creole language with vocabulary based on French spoken in Haiti
- Louisiana Creole, a French-based creole language spoken in Louisiana
- Saint Lucian Creole, a French-based creole language spoken in Saint Lucia

People and cultures

- French Creoles a historic ethnic group of French ancestry born in the colonial western French territories outside France
- French Antillean Creole Caribbean people are considered Latines and Latinos and are part of Latin America
- Creoles of color, a historic ethnic group of mixed racial ancestry born in the colonial western French territories outside France
- Louisiana Creole people, descendants of the colonial settlers of Louisiana, especially French and Spanish.
- A type of taco usually served in French Guiana

Other uses

- French ship Créole, six ships of the French navy

== See also ==
- Creole (disambiguation)
- French
