= Saint-Nazaire submarine base =

German U-boat base in France

- Saint-Nazaire in France
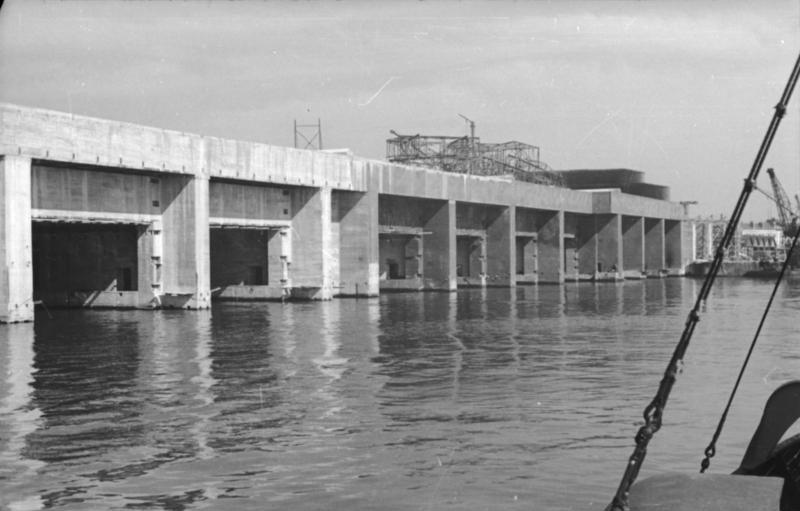
- Saint-Nazaire submarine base, April 1942

Site information
- Type: Submarine pen
- Owner: Nazi Germany
- Operator: Kriegsmarine

Location
- Coordinates: 47°16′30″N 2°12′9″W

Site history
- Built: February 1941– June 1941
- Built by: Organisation Todt
- In use: June 1941– May 1945
- Materials: Reinforced concrete, steel
- Fate: museum

Garrison information
- Garrison: 6th U-boat Flotilla; 7th U-boat Flotilla

The submarine base of Saint-Nazaire is one of five large fortified U-boat pens built by Germany during the Second World War in occupied Saint-Nazaire, France.

== Construction ==
Before the Second World War, Saint-Nazaire was one of the largest harbours of the Atlantic coast of France. During the Battle of France, the German Army arrived in Saint-Nazaire, in June 1940. The harbour was immediately used for submarine operations, with the German submarine U-46 arriving as soon as 29 September 1940.

In December, a mission of the Organisation Todt (Oberbauleitung Süd) inspected the harbour to study the possibilities to build a submarine pen invulnerable to air bombing from England.

The selected space was that of the docks and buildings of the Compagnie Générale Transatlantique, which were razed. Building began in February 1941, with pens 6, 7, and 8 completed in June 1941. On 30 June 1941, Vizeadmiral Karl Dönitz formally opened the U-boat pen, with U-203 being the first boat to occupy one of the pens. From July 1941 to January 1942, pens 9 through 14 were built; and between February and June 1942, pens 1 through 5. Work was eventually completed by the building of a tower.

Between late 1943 and early 1944, a fortified lock was built to protect submarines during their transfer from the Loire river and the pens. The lock is 155 metres (509 ft) long, 25 m (82 ft) wide, and 14 m (46 ft) high; the roof features anti-aircraft armament.

== History ==
The adjacent dry-dock in Saint-Nazaire dock was the target of Operation Chariot, a British commando raid in 1942, the U-boat pens were a secondary target of the raid. The attack successfully disabled the dry-dock by ramming an explosive-filled destroyer into it, and by demolition teams wrecking the pumps and electrical system.

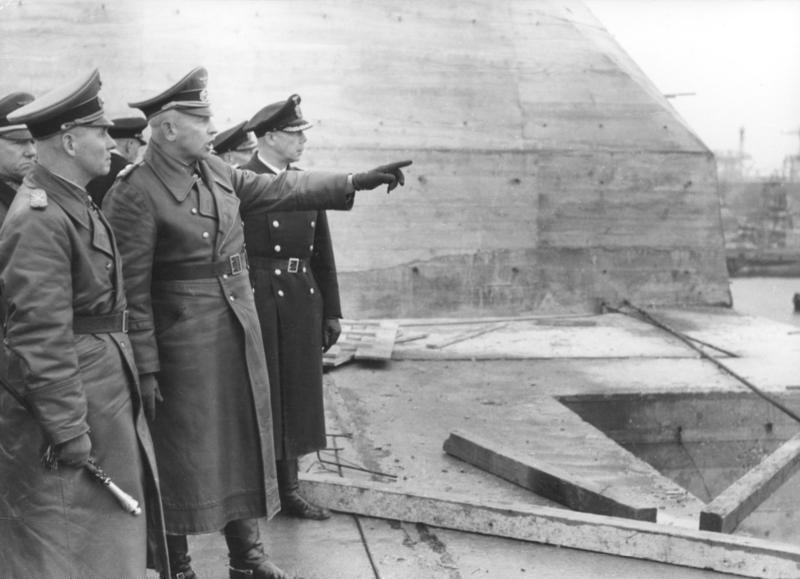
Rommel inspecting the base, 18 February 1944

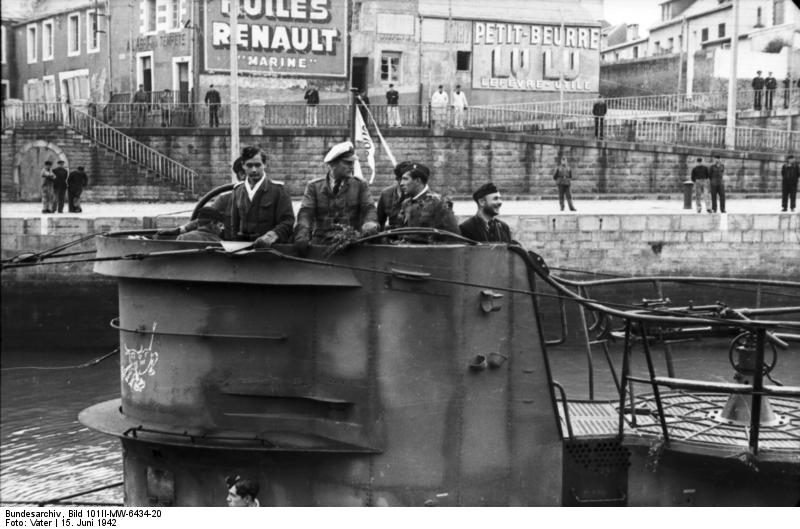
U-455 at Saint-Nazaire

== Design ==
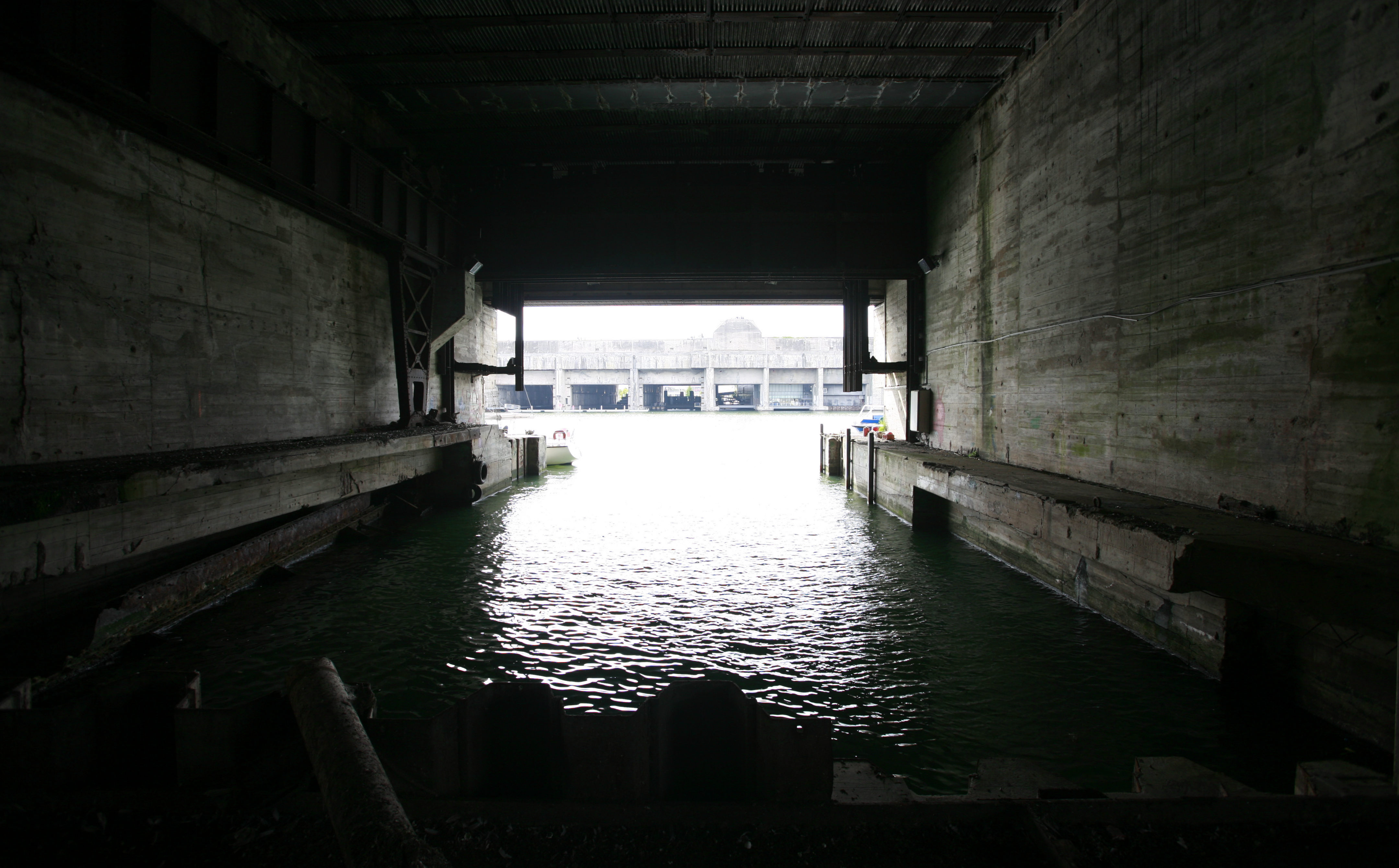

The base is 300 m (980 ft) long, 130 m (430 ft) wide and 18 m (59 ft) high, amounting to a 39,000 m^{2} (420,000 sq ft) surface on the ground, and a volume of concrete of 480,000 m^{3} (17,000,000 cu ft). The roof is 8 m (26 ft) deep, featuring four layers: the first one is a 3.5 m (11 ft) sheet of reinforced concrete; the second is a 35 cm (14 in) granite and concrete layers; the third is a 1.7 m (5 ft 7 in) layer of reinforced concrete, and the fourth, is a "Fangrost" layer of steel beams, 1.40 m (4 ft 7 in) deep. The roof is dotted with anti-aircraft weaponry, machine guns and mortars.

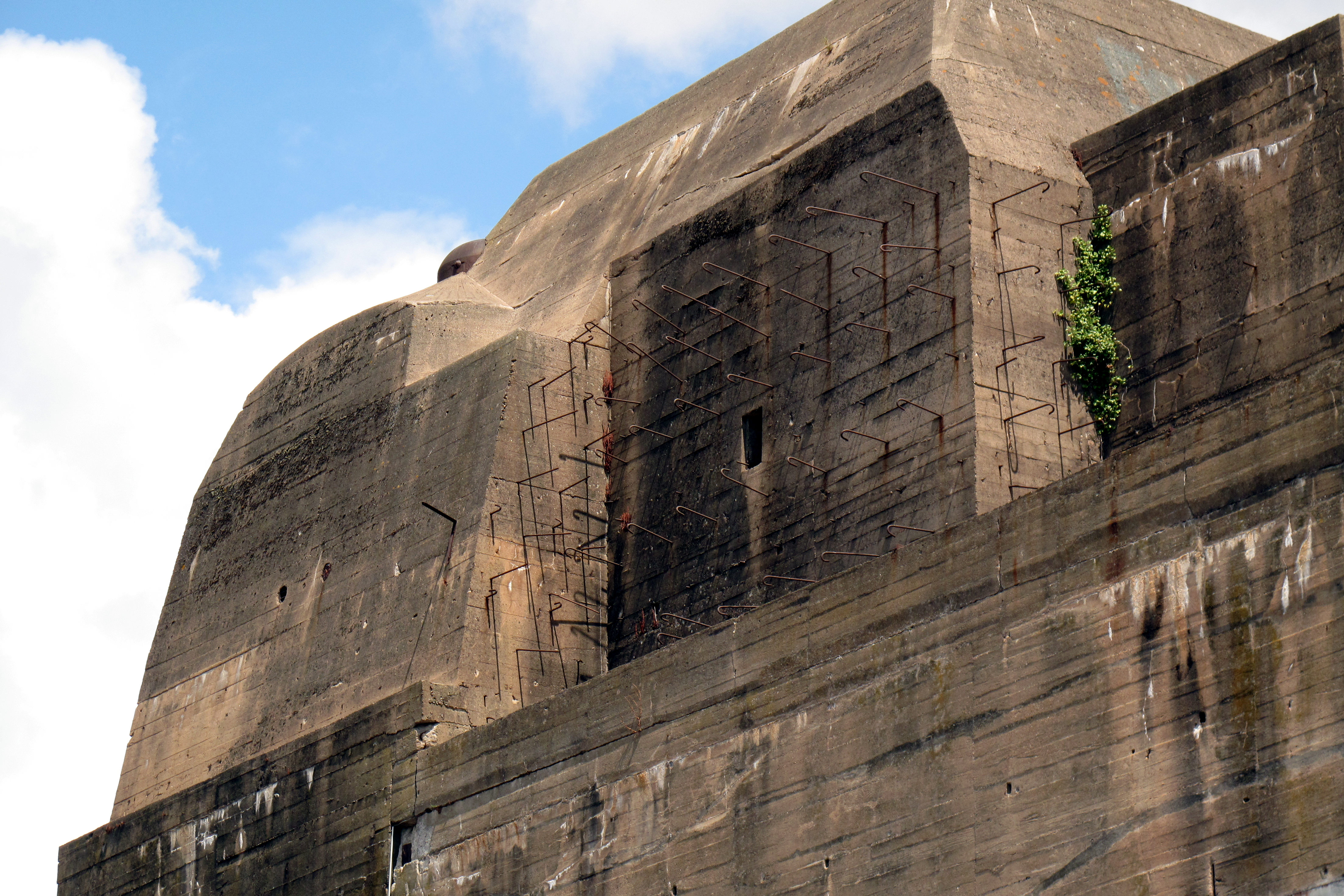

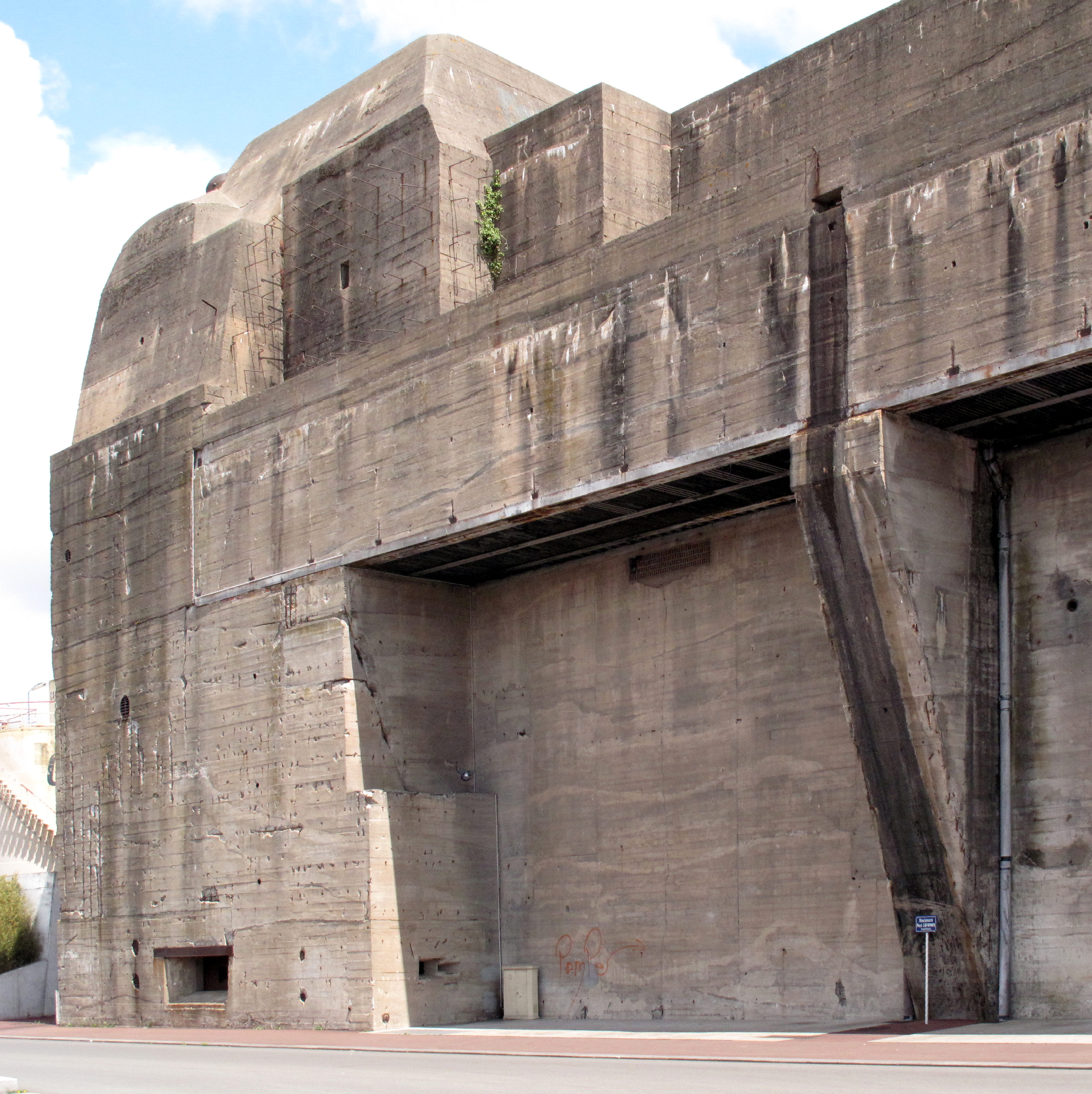

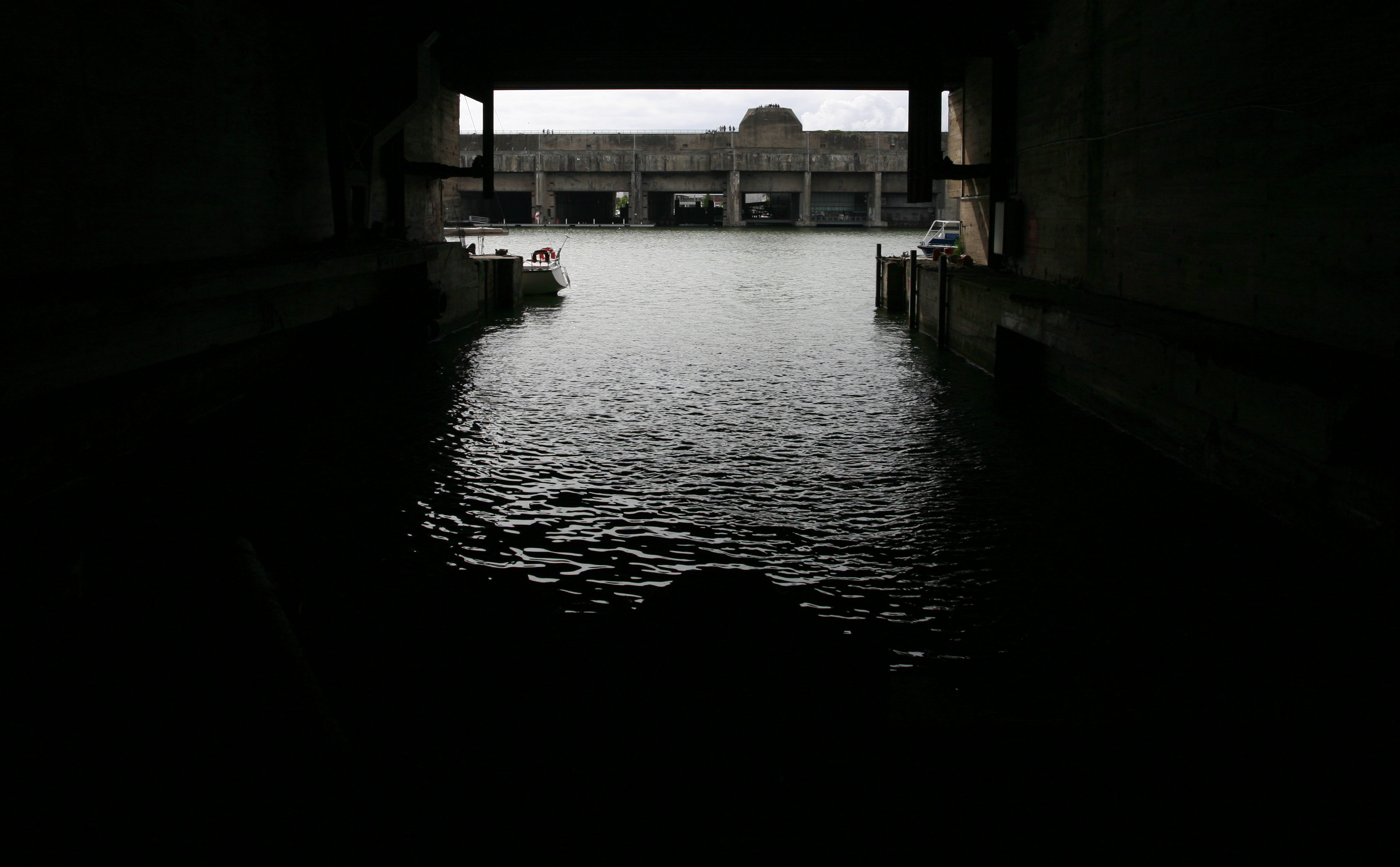

The base offers 14 submarine pens. Pens 1 through 8 are dry docks, 92 m (302 ft) long and 11 m (36 ft) wide; pens 9 through 14 are simple docks, 62 m (203 ft) long and 17 m (56 ft) wide, each holding two submarines.

Between pens 5 and 6, and 12 and 13, are two areas giving access to the upper levels of the base.

The base was equipped with 62 workshops, 97 magazines, 150 offices, 92 dormitories for submarine crews, 20 pumps, 4 kitchens, 2 bakeries, two electrical plants, one restaurant and a hospital.

== Defence ==
On the roof is one completed and one uncompleted M19 Maschinengranatwerfer automatic 5 cm (2.0 in) mortar bunker.

== The Ville-Port ==
The zone of the base was abandoned for a long time. In 1994, the municipality of Saint-Nazaire decided to re-urbanise the base, in a project name Ville-Port (lit: "city-harbour").

The base now features several museums, including a mockup of a transatlantic liner called the Escal'Atlantic, and the French submarine Espadon, built in 1960.

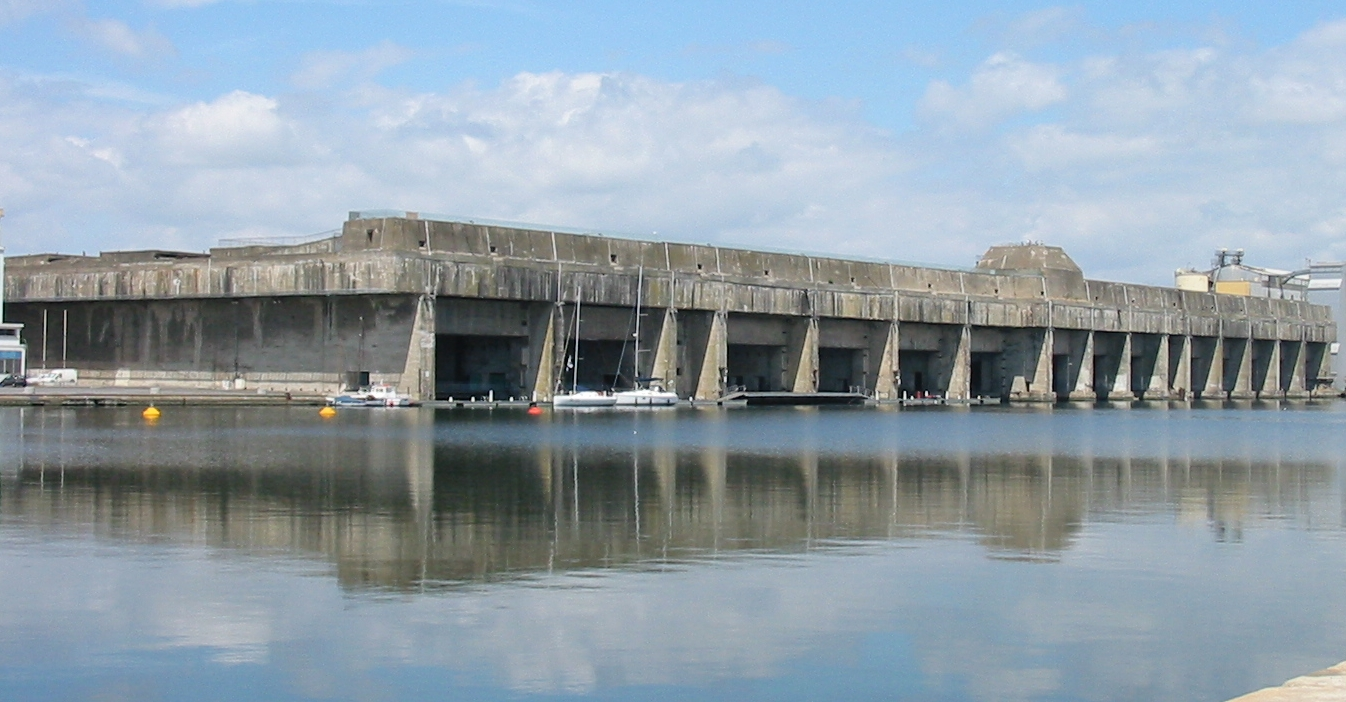
Present-day view of the submarine base of Saint-Nazaire

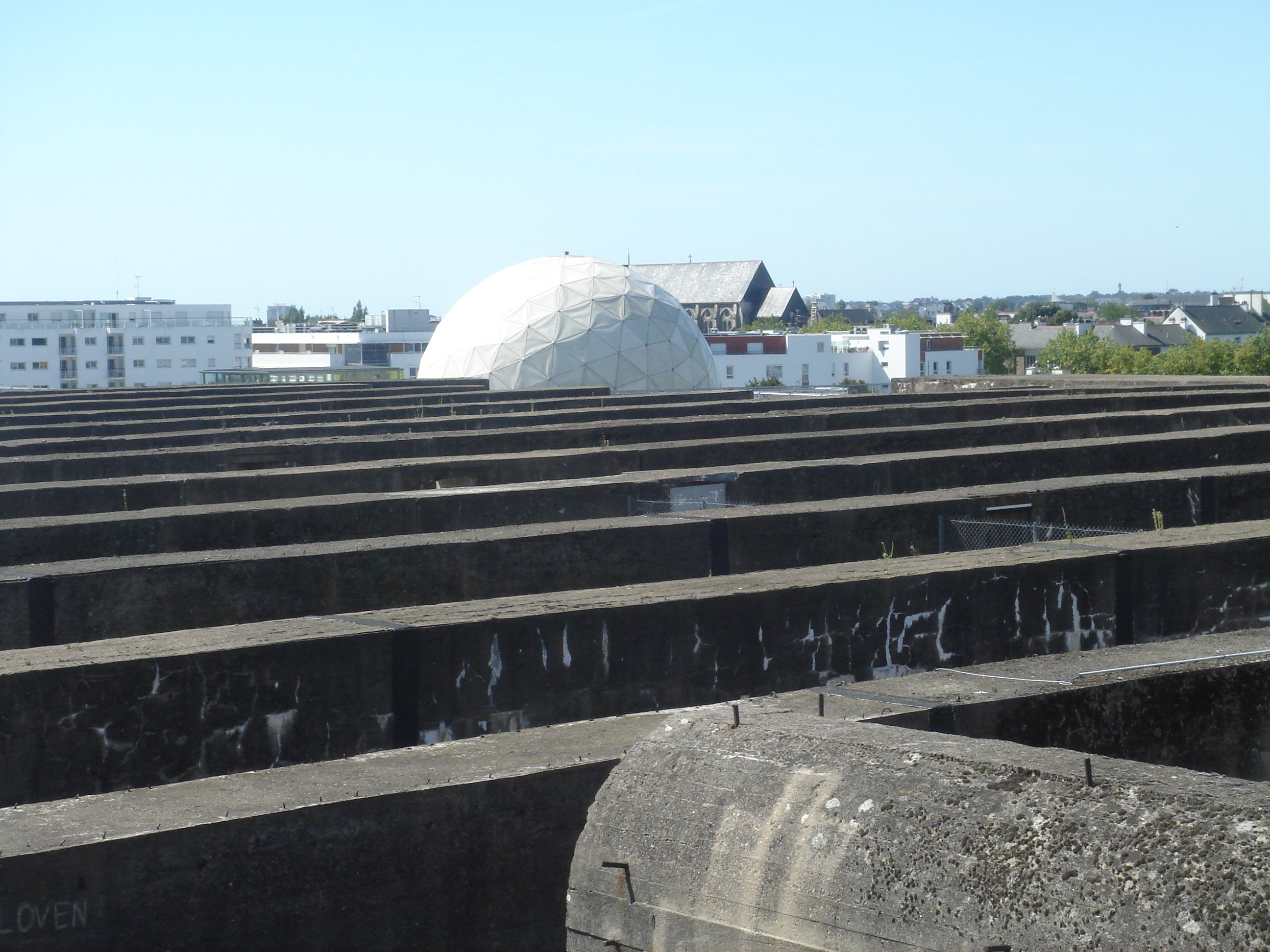
Roof of the base and radome

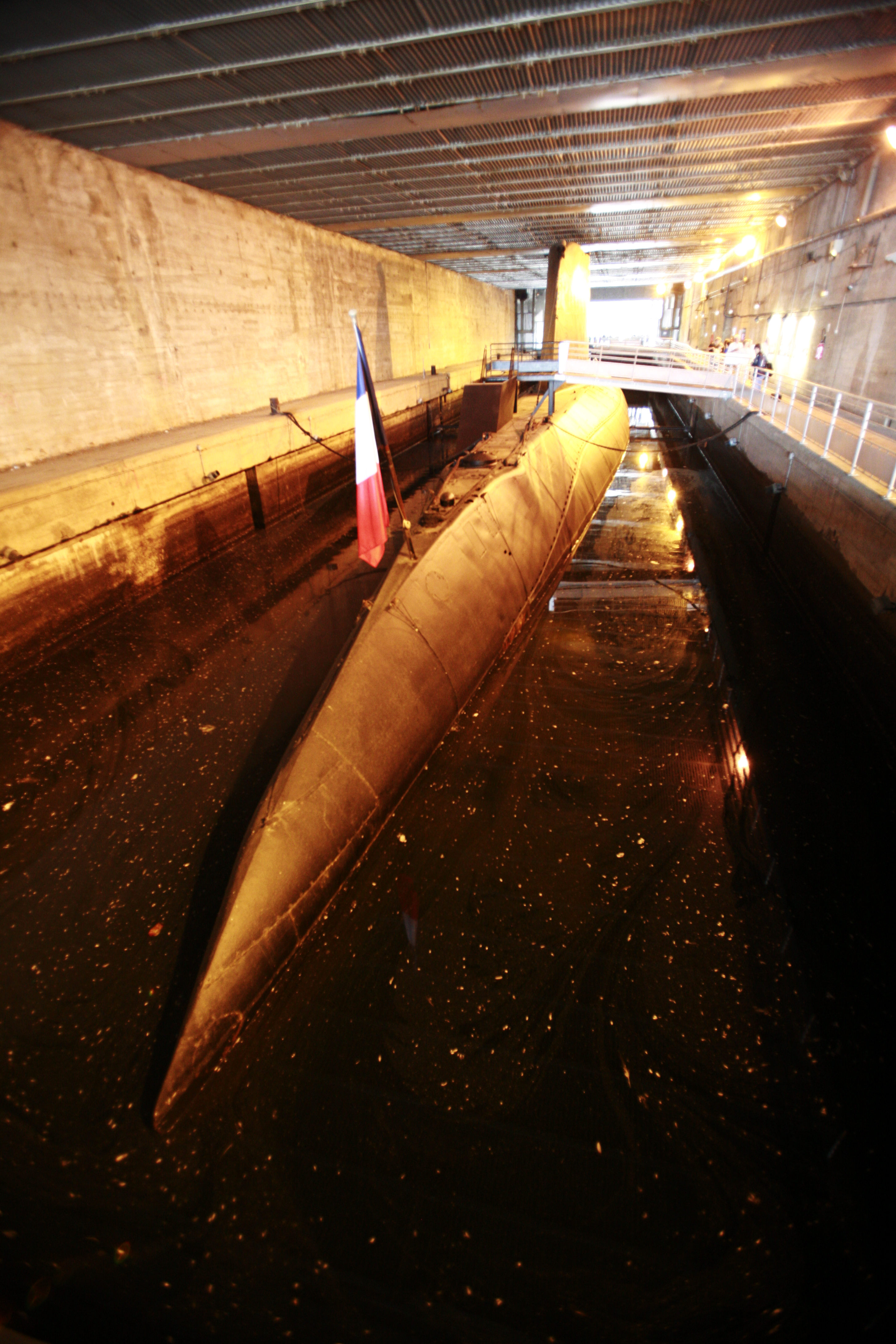
The Espadon as a museum ship

== See also ==
- Lorient Submarine Base
- St Nazaire Raid
