= French submarine Astrée (Q200) =

French submarine

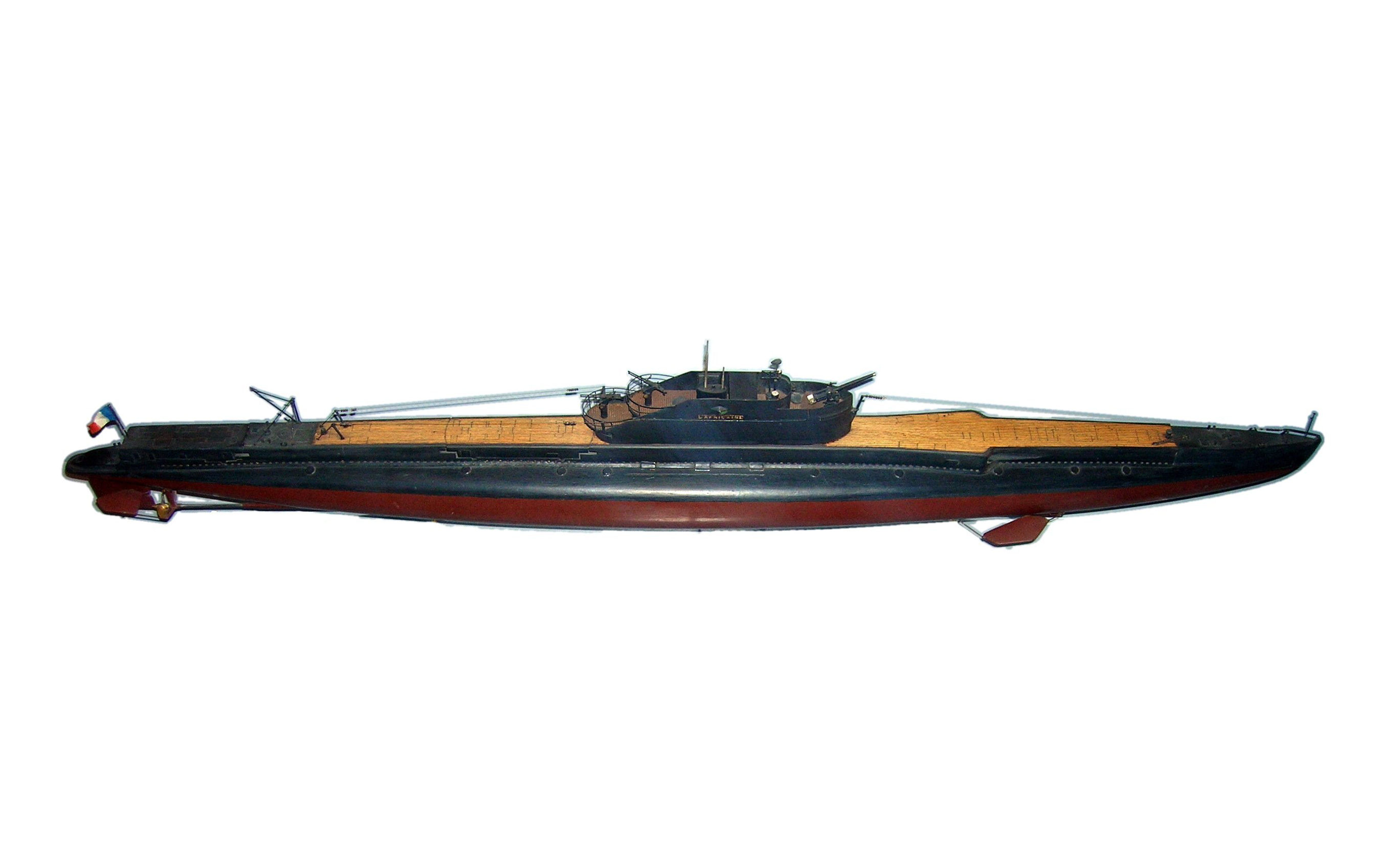
- Model of Africaine, sister boat of Astrée

History

France
- Name: Astrée
- Namesake: Astraea
- Ordered: 1938
- Builder: Nantes
- Laid down: November 1938
- Captured: by Nazi Germany in June 1940
- Fate: Incomplete, captured by German in June 1940

Nazi Germany
- Name: UF-3
- Acquired: June 1940
- Fate: Captured by Allies

France
- Name: Astrée
- Namesake: Astraea
- Launched: 3 May 1946
- Commissioned: October 1949
- Decommissioned: 1962
- Stricken: 27 November 1965
- Fate: Scrapped

General characteristics
- Class & type: Aurore-class submarine
- Displacement: 900 tonnes (890 long tons) surfaced; 1,170 tonnes (1,150 long tons) submerged
- Length: 73.5 m (241 ft)
- Beam: 6.5 m (21 ft)
- Draught: 4.2 m (14 ft)
- Propulsion: Diesel: 3,000 shp (2,200 kW); 1,400 shp (1,000 kW) electrical
- Speed: 15 knots (28 km/h; 17 mph) surfaced; 9 knots (17 km/h; 10 mph) submerged
- Range: 5,600 nmi (10,400 km; 6,400 mi) at 10 knots (19 km/h; 12 mph); 2,250 nmi (4,170 km; 2,590 mi) at 15 knots (28 km/h; 17 mph); 80 nautical miles (150 km; 92 mi) at 5 knots (9.3 km/h; 5.8 mph) submerged
- Test depth: 100 metres (330 ft)
- Armament: 1 × 100 mm (3.9 in) deck gun; 2 × 13.2 mm (0.52 in) machine guns; 9 × 550 mm (22 in) torpedo tubes

Astrée was an Aurore-class submarine of the French Navy.

Still incomplete, she was captured by the Germans during World War II in June 1940. She was renamed UF-3 on 13 May 1941, but never completed during the German occupation of France. She was recaptured and completed under her original name. Astrée was taken out of service in 1962, and stricken on 27 November 1965 as the Q404.

== See also ==
- List of submarines of France
