= UF-1 =

UF-1 is the name/designation of:

- French submarine Africaine (Q196); an Aurore-class submarine of the French navy.
- Grumman HU-16 Albatross; a large twin-radial engine amphibious flying boat that was used by the United States Air Force/Navy/Coast Guard.
