= French ship Protée =

Seven ships of the French Navy have borne the name Protée, in honour of Proteus.

== French ships named Protée ==
- French ship Protée (1701) (1701–1722), a 48-gun ship of the line
- French frigate Protée (1725) (1725), a frigate
- French ship Protée (1748) (1750–1770), a 64-gun ship of the line, lead ship of her class
- French ship Protée (1772) (1773–1780), a 64-gun Artésien-class ship of the line
- French aviso Protée (1862–1868), an aviso
- French submarine Protée (1903) (1904–1914), a Naïade-class submarine
- French submarine Protée (1930) (1932–1943), a Redoutable-class submarine

== Notes and references ==
=== Bibliography ===
- Roche, Jean-Michel (2005). Dictionnaire des bâtiments de la flotte de guerre française de Colbert à nos jours. Vol. 1. Group Retozel-Maury Millau. ISBN 978-2-9525917-0-6. OCLC 165892922.
- Roche, Jean-Michel (2005). Dictionnaire des bâtiments de la flotte de guerre française de Colbert à nos jours. Vol. 2. Group Retozel-Maury Millau. ISBN 978-2-9525917-0-6. OCLC 165892922.
