= French ship Créole =

Six ships of the French navy have bourn the name Créole in honour of Creole peoples.

== Ships named Créole ==
- Créole (1797), a 40-gun frigate
- Créole (1806), a brig that campaigned in the Indian Ocean under Jacques Bergeret
- Créole (1809), a 10-gun brig-sloop
- Créole (1829), a 24-gun corvette
- Créole (1833), a schooner
- Créole (Q193), an Aurore-class submarine that saw action in the Suez Crisis
Ships of the French Navy named Créole
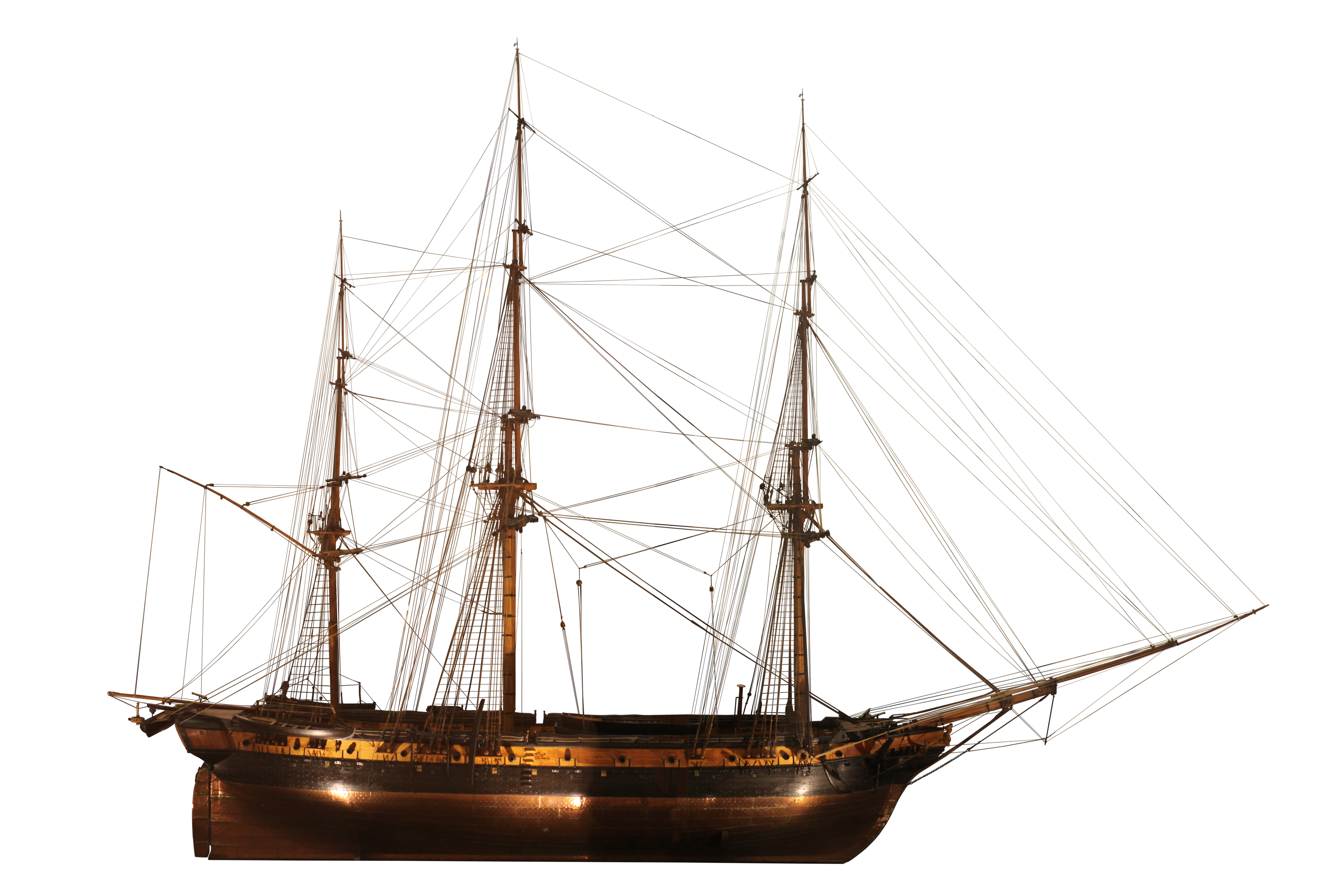
Model of the French corvette Créole

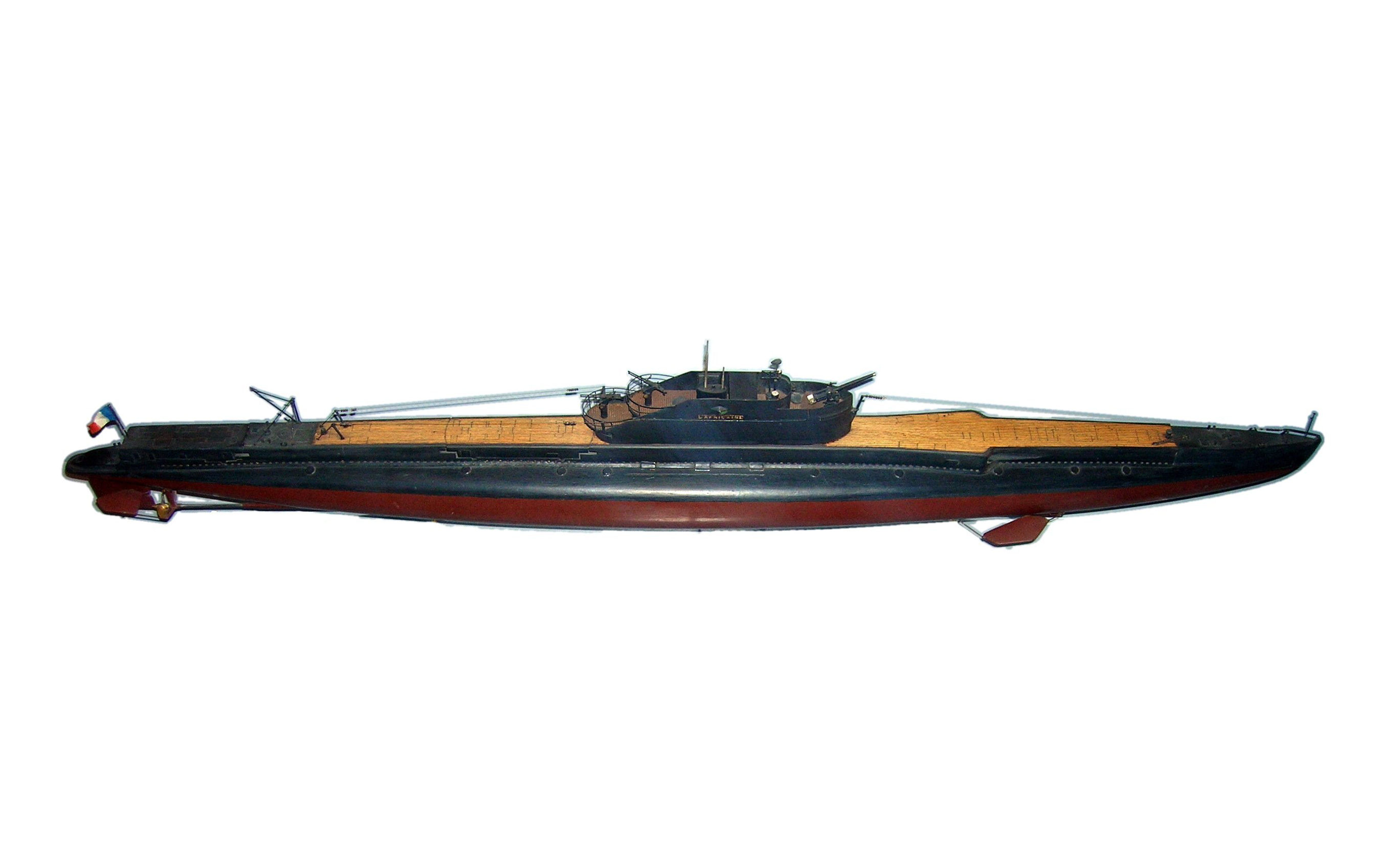
Model of the French submarine Africaine, sister-ship of Créole (Q193)

== Bibliography ==
- Roche, Jean-Michel (2005). Dictionnaire des bâtiments de la flotte de guerre française de Colbert à nos jours. Vol. 1. Group Retozel-Maury Millau. pp. 134–135. ISBN 978-2-9525917-0-6. OCLC 165892922.
- Roche, Jean-Michel (2005). Dictionnaire des bâtiments de la flotte de guerre française de Colbert à nos jours. Vol. 2. Group Retozel-Maury Millau. ISBN 978-2-9525917-0-6. OCLC 165892922.
- Quintin, Danielle et Bernard (2003). Dictionnaire des capitaines de Vaisseau de Napoléon. S.P.M. ISBN 2-901952-42-9.
