= French submarine Favorite (Q195) =

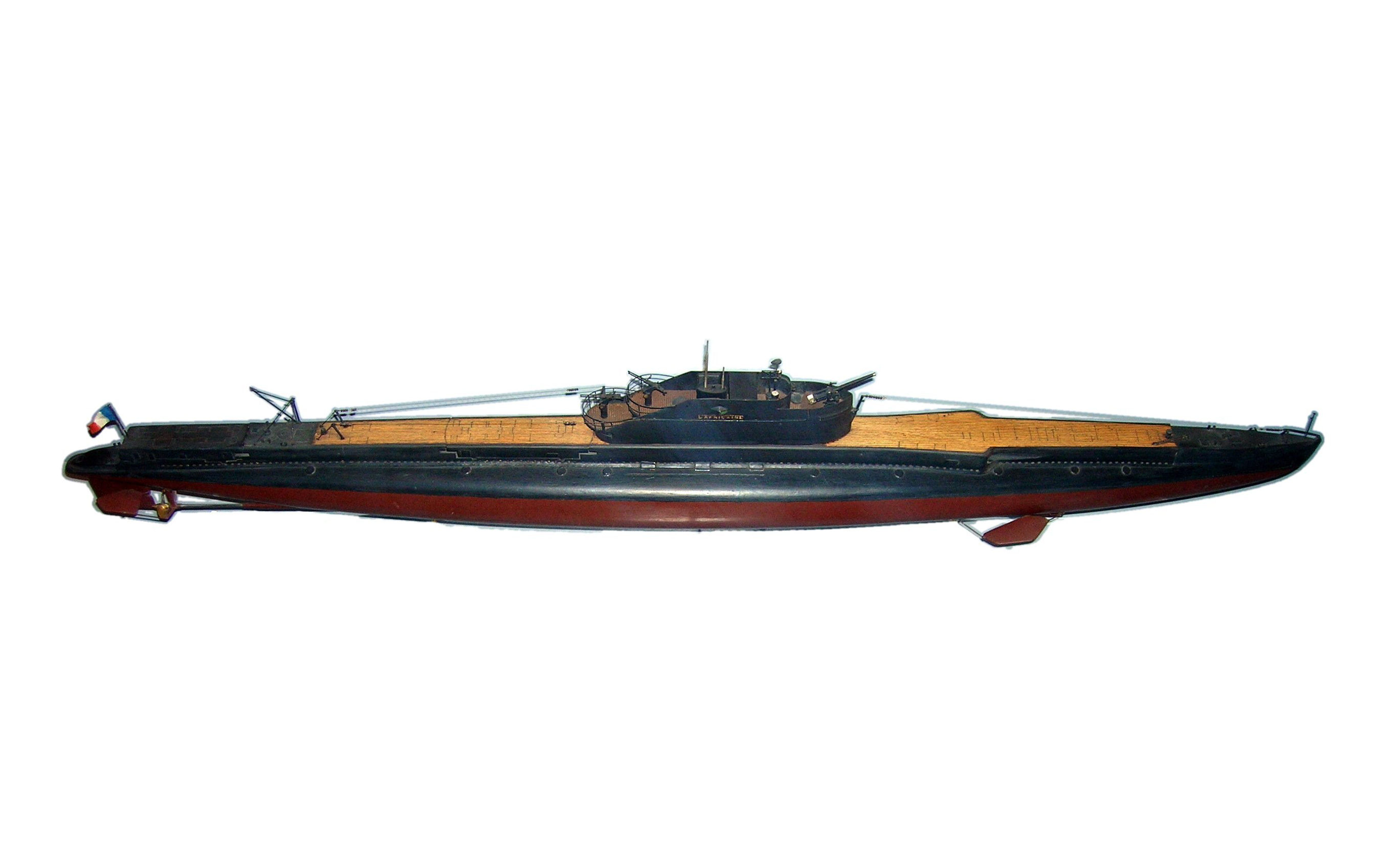
- A model of Africaine, sister ship of Favorite

History

France
- Name: Favorite
- Namesake: "Favourite"
- Ordered: 1937
- Builder: Rouen
- Laid down: December 1937
- Launched: September 1938
- Fate: Incomplete, captured by Germans in June 1940

Nazi Germany
- Name: UF-2
- Acquired: June 1940
- Commissioned: 5 November 1942
- Decommissioned: 5 July 1944
- Fate: Scuttled at Gotenhafen in 1945

General characteristics
- Class & type: Aurore-class submarine
- Displacement: 818 t (805 long tons) surfaced; 1,078 t (1,061 long tons) submerged
- Length: 73.50 m (241 ft 2 in) o/a
- Beam: 6.50 m (21 ft 4 in) o/a
- Draught: 4.57 m (15 ft 0 in)
- Propulsion: Diesel: 2,200 kW (3,000 shp); Electrical: 1,000 kW (1,400 shp)
- Speed: 15.5 knots (28.7 km/h; 17.8 mph) surfaced; 10 knots (19 km/h; 12 mph) submerged
- Range: 5,600 nmi (10,400 km; 6,400 mi) at 10 knots (19 km/h; 12 mph); 80 nmi (150 km; 92 mi) at 5 knots (9.3 km/h; 5.8 mph) submerged
- Test depth: 100 m (330 ft)
- Complement: 3 officers, 37 enlisted
- Armament: 1 × 100 mm (3.9 in) deck gun; 2 × 13.2 mm (0.52 in) machine guns; 9 × 550 mm (22 in) torpedo tubes

Service record as UF-2
- Part of: 5th U-boat Flotilla; November 1942 – August 1943; U-boat Defense School; August 1943 – July 1944
- Identification codes: M 50 058
- Commanders: K.Kapt. Georg Lange; 5 November 1942 – October 1943; Oblt.z.S. Heinrich Gehrken; October 1943 – 5 July 1944
- Operations: None
- Victories: None

Favorite was an Aurore-class submarine of the French Navy. The boat was captured by the German in June 1940 and renamed UF-2 on 13 May 1941.

== Career ==
Favorite was laid down in December 1937 in Rouen, and launched in September 1938. She never participated in any patrols with the French Navy.

After her capture, she was commissioned into Nazi Germany's Kriegsmarine on 5 November 1942 and used as a training ship in the 5th Flotilla (Kiel) from November 1942 to August 1943, as well as in the U-Abwehrschule (Bergen), from August 1943 to July 1944. She was decommissioned on 5 July 1944, and scuttled at Gotenhafen in 1945.

== See also ==
- List of submarines of France

== Bibliography ==
- Busch, Rainer; Röll, Hans-Joachim (1999). German U-boat commanders of World War II : a biographical dictionary. Translated by Brooks, Geoffrey. London, Annapolis, Md: Greenhill Books, Naval Institute Press. ISBN 1-55750-186-6.
- Busch, Rainer; Röll, Hans-Joachim (1999). Deutsche U-Boot-Verluste von September 1939 bis Mai 1945 [German U-boat losses from September 1939 to May 1945]. Der U-Boot-Krieg (in German). Vol. IV. Hamburg, Berlin, Bonn: Mittler. ISBN 3-8132-0514-2.
- Gröner, Erich; Jung, Dieter; Maass, Martin (1991). U-boats and Mine Warfare Vessels. German Warships 1815–1945. Vol. 2. Translated by Thomas, Keith; Magowan, Rachel. London: Conway Maritime Press. ISBN 0-85177-593-4.
