= French submarine Aurore =

French submarine

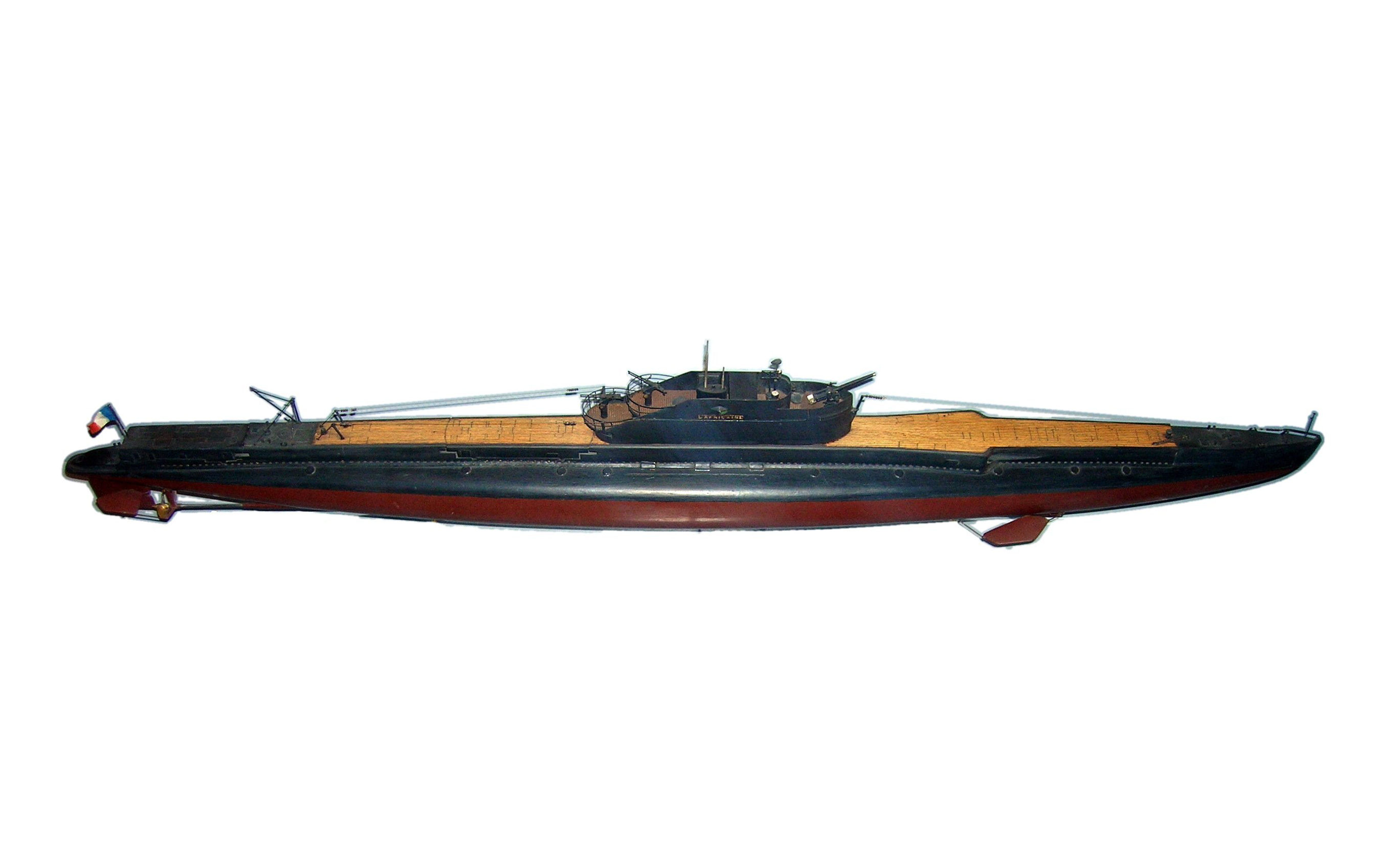
- Model of Africaine, sister ship of Créole.

History

France
- Name: Aurore
- Namesake: Aurora, the goddess of dawn in Roman mythology
- Builder: Arsenal de Toulon, Toulon, France
- Laid down: 1 September 1936
- Launched: 26 July 1939
- Commissioned: 20 June 1940
- Fate: Scuttled 27 November 1942; Scrapped 1946

General characteristics
- Class & type: Aurore-class submarine
- Displacement: 900 tonnes (886 long tons) surfaced; 1,170 tonnes (1,150 long tons) submerged
- Length: 73.5 m (241 ft 2 in)
- Beam: 6.5 m (21 ft 4 in)
- Draught: 4.2 m (13 ft 9 in)
- Propulsion: Diesel: 2,237 kW (3,000 shp); 1,044 kW (1,400 shp) electrical
- Speed: 15 knots (28 km/h; 17 mph) surfaced; 9 knots (17 km/h; 10 mph) submerged
- Range: 5,600 nmi (10,400 km; 6,440 mi) at 10 knots (19 km/h; 12 mph); 2,250 nmi (4,170 km; 2,590 mi) at 15 knots; 80 nmi (148 km; 92 mi) submerged at 5 knots (9.3 km/h; 5.8 mph)
- Test depth: 100 m (328 ft)
- Armament: 1 × 100 mm (3.9 in) deck gun; 2 × 13.2 mm machine guns; 9 × 550 mm (21.7 in) torpedo tubes

Aurore (Q192) was a French Navy submarine, the lead ship of the Aurore-class. She served in the naval forces of Vichy France during the early years of World War II and was scuttled in November 1942.

== Construction and commissioning ==
Laid down at the Arsenal de Toulon in Toulon, France, on 1 September 1936, Aurore was launched on 26 July 1939. She was still fitting out when World War II began with the German invasion of Poland on 1 September 1939. She made her first static dive at the beginning of 1940, then commenced sea trials, with final equipment testing scheduled for 15 July 1940.

Meanwhile, the Battle of France began with the German invasion of France on 10 May 1940, and Italy joined the invasion on 10 June 1940. With the Allied defense of France collapsing, Aurore and the submarines Aréthuse, Argonaute, Atalante, L'Espoir, Iris, Naïade, La Sultane, and La Vestale received orders on 18 June 1940 to get underway for French North Africa, but all of them remained at Toulon. Aurore′s crew scrounged equipment — at one point her commanding officer sent four quartermasters to Paris in a search for equipment Aurore needed — and on 20 June 1940 she was ready for sea and was placed in commission. On 22 June 1940, however, France concluded an armistice with Germany and Italy, and when it went into effect on 25 June 1940, Aurore still was at Toulon.

== Service history ==
After the armistice, Aurore became part of the naval forces of Vichy France. She continued equipment tests and training until 21 October 1940, when she was placed under guard in an unarmed and unfueled condition under the terms of the armistice, but permitted by the Italian Armistice Commission to maintain readiness to get underway on one week's notice.

On 5 November 1940, the Italian Armistice Commission authorized Aurore and the submarine Archimède to transfer to Dakar in Senegal to relieve the submarines Ajax and Persée there. Aurore and Archimède were assigned along with Aréthuse, La Sultane, and La Vestale to the 1st Relief Submarine Group, and the five submarines departed Toulon on 17 December 1940 bound for Oran in Algeria under escort by the sloop Commandant Bory. They arrived at Oran on 19 December 1940.

Aréthuse, La Sultane, and La Vestale remained at Oran, but Aurore and Archimède continued their voyage, departing Oran under escort by the destroyer Albatros, passing through the Strait of Gibraltar and arriving at Casablanca in French Morocco, where they spent Christmas 1940. Under escort by the destroyers L'Alcyon and Simoun, Aurore and Archimède then completed the final leg of their voyage, arriving at Dakar on 31 December 1940.

At beginning of 1941, Aurore and Archimède were assigned along with six other submarines to the 2nd Section of the 2nd Division of the French West Africa Submarine Group. The submarine group conducted numerous training excursions and engaged in surveillance operations.

On 25 January 1941, Aurore got underway from Dakar in company with the submarine Casabianca bound for Conakry in French Guinea, a territory of French West Africa, arriving there on 27 January 1941. They remained at Conakry until 17 February 1941, when they began their return voyage. They arrived at Dakar on 20 February 1941.

On 9 May 1941, Aurore departed Dakar in company with Archimède bound for Casablanca, where they arrived on 13 May 1941. Aurore departed Casablanca with the submarine Sidi Ferruch on 28 May 1941 to head for Agadir, French Morocco. Aurore spent 22 to 30 July 1941 in Safi, French Morocco. She underwent a refit from 8 to 20 October 1941.

Aurore was assigned to the 4th Submarine Division along with Le Conquérant and Le Tonnant, and the three submarines arrived at Dakar on 18 November 1941. Aurore later returned to Casablanca for repairs, which were accelerated in May 1942. She rejoined her division at Dakar on 14 June 1942. By 1 November 1942 she was in Toulon.

== Loss ==
Aurore was moored at Dock No. 2 of the Vauban Docks at Toulon when Germany and Italy occupied the Free Zone (French: Zone libre) of Vichy France on 27 November 1942. She was among the French vessels scuttled at Toulon to prevent their seizure by Germany when German forces entered Toulon that day.

Aurore′s wreck was refloated on 5 December 1942. The Germans handed it over to French maritime authorities on 20 May 1944. After World War II, it was scrapped in 1946.

== See also ==
- List of submarines of France
