= S610 =

S610 may refer to:

- Laubie (S610), a German Type VII submarine
- Foudroyant (S610), a French ballistic missile submarine of the Le Redoutable type
- NW-S610, a Sony walkman series
