= French submarine Sidi Ferruch =

WWII French submarine

Sidi Ferruch
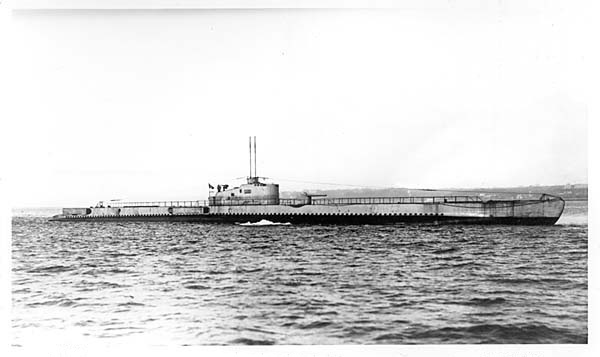
- Sidi Ferruch's sister ship Ajax in 1930

History

France
- Name: Sidi Ferruch
- Namesake: Sidi Ferruch, the French colonial name for Sidi Fredj, a town in Algeria
- Operator: French Navy
- Builder: Arsenal de Cherbourg, Cherbourg, France
- Laid down: 30 January 1932
- Launched: 9 July 1937
- Commissioned: 1 January 1939
- Fate: Sunk 11 November 1942

General characteristics
- Class & type: Redoutable-class submarine
- Displacement: 1,572 tonnes (1,547 long tons) (surfaced); 2,092 tonnes (2,059 long tons) (submerged)
- Length: 92.3 m (302 ft 10 in)
- Beam: 8.1 m (26 ft 7 in)
- Draft: 4.4 m (14 ft 5 in) (surfaced)
- Propulsion: 2 × diesel engines, 6,000 hp (4,474 kW); 2 × electric motors, 2,250 hp (1,678 kW)
- Speed: 17.5 kn (32.4 km/h; 20.1 mph) (surfaced); 10 kn (19 km/h; 12 mph) (submerged)
- Range: 14,000 nmi (26,000 km; 16,000 mi) at 7 kn (13 km/h; 8.1 mph) (surfaced); 10,000 nmi (19,000 km; 12,000 mi) at 10 kn (19 km/h; 12 mph) (surfaced); 4,000 nmi (7,400 km; 4,600 mi) at 17 kn (31 km/h; 20 mph) (surfaced); 90 nmi (170 km; 100 mi) at 7 kn (13 km/h; 8.1 mph) (submerged)
- Test depth: 80 m (262 ft)
- Complement: 5 officers (6 in operations); 66 men
- Armament: 11 torpedo tubes; 1 × 100 mm (3.9 in) gun; 1 × 13.2 mm (0.5 in) machine gun

Sidi Ferruch (French: Sidi-Ferruch) was a French Navy Redoutable-class submarine of the M6 series commissioned in 1939. She participated in World War II, first on the side of the Allies from 1939 to June 1940, then in the navy of Vichy France. She was sunk in November 1942.

== Characteristics ==
Profile of Casabianca, sister ship of Sidi Ferruch.

Sidi Ferruch was part of a fairly homogeneous series of 31 deep-sea patrol submarines also called "1,500-tonners" because of their displacement. All entered service between 1931 and 1939.

The Redoutable-class submarines were 92.3 metres (302 ft 10 in) long and 8.1 metres (26 ft 7 in) in beam and had a draft of 4.4 metres (14 ft 5 in). They could dive to a depth of 80 metres (262 ft). They displaced 1,572 tonnes (1,547 long tons) on the surface and 2,082 tonnes (2,049 long tons) underwater. Propelled on the surface by two diesel engines producing a combined 6,000 horsepower (4,474 kW), they had a maximum speed of 18.6 knots (34.4 km/h; 21.4 mph). When submerged, their two electric motors produced a combined 2,250 horsepower (1,678 kW) and allowed them to reach 10 knots (19 km/h; 12 mph). Also called "deep-cruising submarines", their range on the surface was 10,000 nautical miles (19,000 km; 12,000 mi) at 10 knots (19 km/h; 12 mph). Underwater, they could travel 100 nautical miles (190 km; 120 mi) at 5 knots (9.3 km/h; 5.8 mph).

== Construction and commissioning ==
Laid down at Arsenal de Cherbourg in Cherbourg, France, on 30 January 1932 with the hull number Q181, Sidi Ferruch was launched on 9 July 1937. She was commissioned on 1 January 1939.

== Service history ==
=== French Navy ===
At the start of World War II on 1 September 1939, Sidi Ferruch was assigned to the 8th Submarine Division based at Brest, France. Her sister ships Agosta, Bévéziers, and Ouessant made up the rest of the division. Beginning on 3 September 1939, the day France declared war, Sidi Ferruch patrolled off the northern coast of Spain, where German merchant ships — which the Allies suspected of serving as supply ships for German U-boats — had taken refuge upon the outbreak of war.

At the beginning of October 1939, Sidi Ferruch and the rest of the 8th Submarine Division received orders to leave European waters and proceed to Fort-de-France on Martinique in the French West Indies to conduct patrols in the vicinity of Trinidad the British had requested. In February 1940, Sidi Ferruch and Bévéziers were assigned to escort duty for British convoys steaming from North America to the United Kingdom. Sidi Ferruch escorted two convoys, including Convoy HX 27, from Halifax, Nova Scotia, Canada, to Liverpool, England. She returned to Brest on 27 March 1940.

After a minor refit, Sidi Ferruch deployed to Casablanca in French Morocco. German ground forces advanced into France on 10 May 1940, beginning the Battle of France, and Italy declared war on France on 10 June 1940 and joined the invasion. Sidi Ferruch was at Casablanca as part of the 8th Submarine Division with Bévéziers when the Battle of France ended in France's defeat and armistices with Germany on 22 June 1940 and with Italy on 24 June, both of which went into effect on 25 June 1940.

=== Vichy France ===
==== 1940 ====
After France's surrender, Sidi Ferruch served in the naval forces of Vichy France. After the attack on Mers-el-Kébir — in which a British Royal Navy squadron attacked a French Navy squadron moored at the naval base at Mers El Kébir in Oran on the coast of Algeria — took place on 3 July 1940, Sidi Ferruch and Bévéziers were detached to operate in the waters of French West Africa. They departed Casablanca on the evening of 4 July 1940 bound for Dakar in Senegal, which they reached on 9 July 1940, the day after an air raid on the port there by Fleet Air Arm aircraft from the Royal Navy aircraft carrier HMS Hermes, conducted as part of Operation Catapult. On 15 July 1940, Sidi Ferruch set out on her first patrol from Dakar.

In August 1940, Sidi Ferruch and Bévéziers were assigned to the 2nd Submarine Division to form the division′s second section. Sidi Ferruch patrolled off Dakar from 2 to 6 August 1940, then on 6 August departed Dakar to replace Bévéziers at Douala in French Cameroon. She called at Douala from 13 to 25 August 1940, then proceeded to Gabon — at the time a territory of French Equatorial Africa — where she called at Libreville from 26 to 27 August and at Port-Gentil from 28 to 29 August 1940. She returned to Libreville on 30 August 1940 and played an active role in restoring Vichy French authority there. She departed Libreville on 15 September 1940 bound for Tabou, Ivory Coast, which she visited from 20 to 21 September 1940. She then got underway to return to Dakar.

On 23 September 1940, British forces attacked Dakar, beginning the Battle of Dakar. Sidi Ferruch at the time was escorting a cargo ship off Conakry, French Guinea, two days from Dakar. She received orders to proceed to Dakar and attack the British force. By about 10:00 on 25 September 1940, she was operating along the British withdrawal route from Dakar. During the day she sighted the funnels of two ocean liners and attempted to close with them, but at 17:55 aircraft from the aircraft carrier HMS Ark Royal sighted and bombed her, forcing her to dive and allowing the ships to escape. She then patrolled on the surface about 50 nautical miles (93 km; 58 mi) from Dakar until returning to Dakar on 26 September 1940.

On both 23 and 28 October 1940,Sidi Ferruch was recorded as belonging to the 2nd Submarine Division based as Casablanca, along with Béveziers, Casabianca, and Sfax.

==== 1941 ====
Sidi Ferruch and her sister ship Archimède got underway from Dakar on 19 February 1941 to relieve Casabianca and the submarine Aurore at Conakry, which they reached on 21 February. From 23 to 25 February 1941 they patrolled in the Gulf of Guinea off French Guinea. They departed French Equatorial Africa on 10 March to return to Dakar, where they arrived on 12 March 1941.

Sidi Ferruch and Archimède left Dakar on 9 May 1941 to head for Casablanca. Sidi Ferruch subsequently made a stop at Agadir, French Morocco, from 9 to 16 July 1941 before proceeding to Toulon, France. She was disarmed and defueled at Toulon in September 1941 in accordance with the terms of the 1940 armistice.

==== 1942 ====
Sidi Ferruch was rearmed in April 1942, and she and the submarine Antiope arrived in July 1942 at Dakar, where Sidi Ferruch relieved Aurore so that Aurore could proceed to Toulon for a major overhaul. At 23:00 on 17 July 1942, Sidi Ferruch got underway from Dakar in company with the auxiliary cruiser Quercy for what was planned as a one-month cruise to rendezvous with and escort the tanker Nivôse, which had departed Saigon in French Indochina with a cargo of 12,000 tonnes (11,810 long tons; 13,228 short tons) of fuel oil for the 4th Squadron and was proceeding to Dakar by a route which took her around the south coast of Australia and Cape Horn on the southern tip of South America. Sidi Ferruch and Quercy rendezvoused with Nivôse in the Atlantic Ocean at 12°52′S 24°00′W on 29 July 1942 and escorted her the rest of the way to Dakar, where they arrived without incident on 5 August 1942. During the voyage, Sidi Ferruch had covered 4,559 nautical miles (8,443 km; 5,246 mi) in 19 days at sea.

Sidi Ferruch was assigned to the 4th Submarine Division on 22 August 1942. She still was listed on 1 November 1942 as part of the 4th Submarine Division, based at Dakar.

On 8 November 1942, the 4th Submarine Division consisted of Sidi Ferruch and her sister ships Le Conquérant and Le Tonnant, all of which were at Casablanca that morning, with Sidi Ferruch and Le Tonnant preparing to carry out orders to conduct a reconnaissance off Safi, French Morocco. Allied forces landed in French North Africa in Operation Torch that day and the Naval Battle of Casablanca between United States Navy and Vichy French forces began that morning. Taken by surprise in the harbor at Casablanca, Sidi Ferruch, Le Conquérant, and Le Tonnant sortied under attack by U.S. Navy aircraft. Sidi Ferruch got underway at 07:30 intending to wait for orders outside the harbor and came under attack by TBF Avenger torpedo bombers armed with bombs. Damaged by the aircraft, she suffered one killed and four wounded, including her commanding officer, who suffered serious wounds.

Sidi Ferruch′s executive officer took command. Noting the strength of U.S. forces off the harbor, he decided to hug the coast and head for Safi in accordance with Sidi Ferruch′s previous orders. Two of her wounded died during the day. She surfaced at 19:30 and headed for Madeira Island in the Madeira Archipelago to disembark her two surviving wounded. Her three dead were buried at sea at midnight on 8–9 November 1942.

Sidi Ferruch had numerous holes in her superstructure inflicted by machine-gun bullets as she left the harbor at Casablanca, so on the morning of 9 November 1942 she stopped halfway to Madeira to make repairs at sea. After receiving a message directing her to carry out the previously ordered reconnaissance off Safi, she abandoned her plans to disembark her wounded at Madeira Island and instead made for Safi in the early afternoon. At 21:30, when she was about 100 nautical miles (190 km; 120 mi) off the coast of French Morocco, she sighted the Spanish cargo ship Monte Orduna, which was on a voyage to the Canary Islands, and tried to contact her, but a plane arrived on the scene and forced her to dive. After resurfacing, she sent a boarding party to Monte Orduna, whose captain agreed to take aboard Sidi Ferruch′s wounded. After transferring her wounded to Monte Orduna, Sidi Ferruch resumed her transit to Safi, and at daybreak on 10 November 1942 began a submerged patrol off Safi.

On 10 November 1942, Sidi Ferruch received a recall order and apparently began a return voyage to Casablanca. She was not seen or heard from for the remainder of the day.

==== Loss ====
On the morning of 11 November 1942, the day the Allies and Vichy French forces in North Africa signed a ceasefire, Sidi Ferruch surfaced near El Hank, French Morocco, about 20 nautical miles (37 km; 23 mi) west of Casablanca, and headed toward the port. A flight of four TBF-1 Avengers of U.S. Navy Escort Scouting Squadron 27 (VGS-27) from the escort aircraft carrier USS Suwannee (ACV-27) sighted her at 07:10 bearing 260 degrees and 12 nautical miles (22 km; 14 mi) from Casablanca. They misidentified her as a German Type VII submarine, and three of them dived out of cloud cover and attacked her from astern as she began a crash dive. The three Avengers dropped a total of twelve 325-pound (147 kg) depth charges, four of which landed around Sidi Ferruch's conning tower as she submerged and six to eight of which landed within what the aircraft crews considered "lethal range." As the depth charges exploded, the aircraft crews noted what they described as an "iron bar" flying into the air. After Sidi Ferruch disappeared beneath the surface, the Avenger crews observed a large oil slick on the surface and saw air bubbles rise to the surface from a fixed location for the next 30 minutes. It marked the end of Sidi Ferruch, sunk with the loss of all hands off Fedhala Roads, French Morocco, at 33°35′N 007°50′W.

In 1948, the U.S. Navy proposed that Sidi Ferruch had been sunk off Cisneros in Río de Oro on 13 November 1942 by two PBY Catalina flying boats of U.S. Navy Patrol Squadron 92 (VP-92), but that submarine eventually was identified as Le Conquérant.
