= Creole =

Creole may refer to:

== Anthropology ==
- Alaskan Creole people, people descended from the inhabitants of colonial Alaska before it became a part of the United States during the period of Russian rule
- Creole peoples, ethnic groups which originated from linguistic, cultural, and often racial mixing of colonial-era emigrants from Europe with non-European peoples
- Criollo people, the historic name of people of full or nearly full Spanish descent in Colonial Hispanic America and the Spanish East Indies
- Creole language, a language that originated as a pidgin. Many creole languages are known by their speakers as some variant of "creole", for example spelled Kriol.
  - List of creole languages
    - English-based creole languages, sometimes abbreviated English creoles
    - French-based creole languages, also termed Bourbonnais creole or Mascarene creole in western Indian Ocean islands

== Music ==
- Creole music, a genre of folk music in Louisiana, the United States

=== Performers and record labels ===
- La Compagnie Créole, French music group
- Kid Creole and the Coconuts, American music group
- The Kidd Creole (b. 1960), American rapper
- Creole Records, a record label

=== Works ===
- La créole, an 1875 opéra comique, with music by Jacques Offenbach
- Creole (album), a 1998 album by David Murray released on the Justin Time label
- "Creole" (song), a 2006 song from the album B'Day by Beyonce
- King Creole (soundtrack) a 1958 soundtrack album and song by Elvis Presley for his film of the same name

== Ships ==
- French ship Créole, various ships of the French Navy
- Creole, an American slave ship involved in the Creole case

== Other uses ==
- Créole cuisine, a type of cuisine made from a mixture of influences during colonial times
- Creole marble, a marble from quarries in Pickens County, Georgia, United States
- Creole (markup), a common wiki markup language to be used across different wikis
- Creole Petroleum Corporation, an American oil company formed in 1920 and nationalized by Venezuela in 1976

== See also ==
- Broken English (disambiguation)
- Creola (disambiguation)
- Criollo (disambiguation)
- Crioulo (disambiguation)
- Krio (disambiguation)
- Créol, Gabonese musician
- Pidgin, a simplified language originating from a blend of languages
  - List of English-based pidgins
- Pidgin (disambiguation)
- Isle Brevelle
- Cane River
- Natchitoches Parish
