= French Narval-class submarine =

French Navy patrol submarine class (1958–1992)

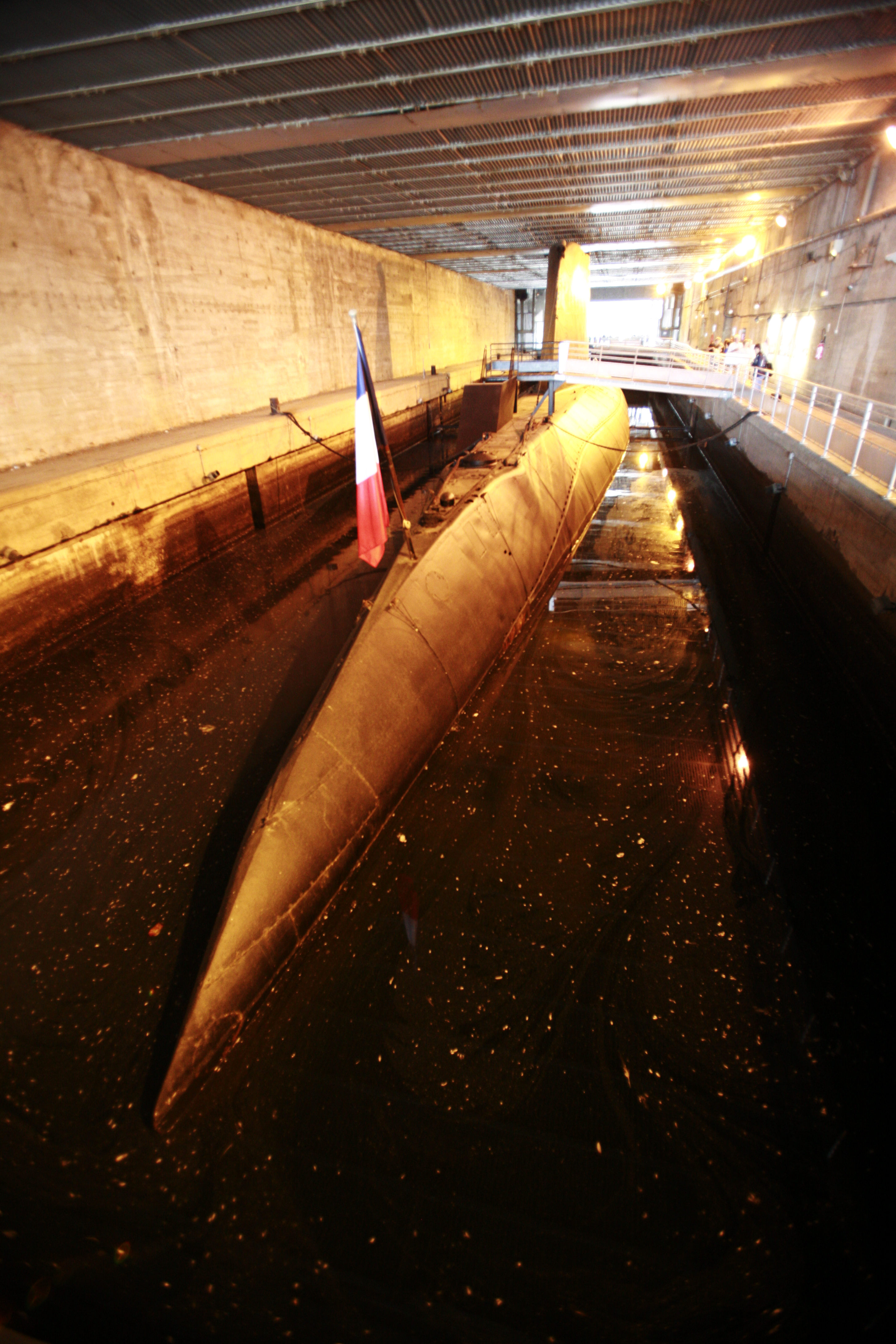
- Espadon in Saint-Nazaire

Class overview
- Name: Narval class
- Operators: Marine Nationale
- Preceded by: Aurore class
- Succeeded by: Aréthuse class
- In service: 1958–1992
- Completed: 6
- Retired: 6
- Preserved: 1

General characteristics
- Type: Submarine
- Displacement: 1,635 tons surfaced; 1,910 tons submerged
- Length: 78.4 m (257 ft 3 in)
- Beam: 7.8 m (25 ft 7 in)
- Draft: 5.2 m (17 ft 1 in)
- Propulsion: 2 shafts, 2 × 7-cylinder diesel engines (4,400 hp (3,300 kW)), 2 electric motors (5,000 hp (3,700 kW)), re-engined with new diesels in 1965–1968
- Speed: 16 knots (30 km/h) surfaced; 18 knots (33 km/h) submerged
- Range: 15,000 nautical miles (28,000 km) at 8 knots (15 km/h)
- Test depth: 400 m (1,300 ft)
- Complement: 63
- Armament: 8 × 550 mm (22 in) torpedo tubes: 6 bow & 2 stern, 14 torpedoes carried

The Narval class (sous-marins d'escadre, "fleet submarines") were patrol submarines built for the French Navy in the 1950s.

== Design ==
The Narval type was an offspring of the E-48 project, inspired by the German Type XXI U-boats of the Second World War, particularly Roland Morillot which were brought into French service.

Compared to the Type XXI, the Narval class introduced an entirely new schnorchel system and novel detection systems, gained 33% in operational range on electric power (400 nautical miles (740 km; 460 mi), compared to the 290 nmi (540 km; 330 mi) available to the type XXI), and doubled the test depth. The propellers were also particularly studied to minimise noise.

The hulls of the Narvals were assembled from seven 10-metre (33 ft) sections welded together.

The engine were two-stroke diesels made by the French constructor Schneider, which proved unreliable and noisy to the point where the engine section became difficult to man at full power.

From 1966 to 1970, the Narvals underwent extensive modernisation, where their engines were replaced by a diesel-electrical design based on the SEMT-Pielstick 12PA4-185. The two stern torpedo tubes were deleted, electronics were replaced, and the conning tower was replaced by a more modern sail plan from the Daphné class.

== Service history ==
The Narvals were used to explore limits of submarines performances in several ways.

Dauphin (foreground) and Espadon (background) in La Rochelle, July 1969

In 1958, Dauphin and Requin broke the 30-day world record of the longest underwater cruise held jointly by the nuclear-powered USS Skate and USS Seawolf, with 32 and 42 days submerged respectively.

In 1964, Espadon and Marsouin sailed up to the 70th parallel north to prepare the first French attempts at navigation under sea ice. These tests were carried out the next year by Dauphin and Narval when they spent a week and a half in the 72nd parallel north.

During her last years, from 1980, Requin was fitted with the sonar system planned for the M4 refit of the SNLE. Similarly, Dauphin was extensively modified from 1986 to be used as a test bed for equipment and sensors to be installed on the Triomphant-class submarines, then under design. When finally decommissioned in 1992, she was the oldest submarine in service. She was later expended as a target ship off Toulon.

In 1985, Espadon became the first French submarine used as a museum ship.

== Ships ==
Pennant number	Name	Builder	Completed	Decommissioned	Fate
S631	Narval	Arsenal de Cherbourg	1 December 1957	1986	
S632	Marsouin	Arsenal de Cherbourg	1 October 1957	1987	
S633	Dauphin	Arsenal de Cherbourg	1 August 1958	1992	
S634	Requin	Arsenal de Cherbourg	1 August 1958	1985	
S637	Espadon	AC Augustin Normand	2 April 1960	1985	Museum ship in Saint Nazaire
S638	Morse	AC de la Seine Maritime	2 May 1960	1986	

== See also ==
- List of submarines of France

Equivalent submarines of the same era

- Dolfijn class
- Zulu class
- Tang class
- Porpoise class
