= French submarine Laubie =

German World War II submarine

- Insignia of U-766

History

Nazi Germany
- Name: U-766
- Ordered: 15 August 1940
- Builder: Kriegsmarinewerft Wilhelmshaven
- Yard number: 149
- Laid down: 1 March 1941
- Launched: 29 May 1943
- Commissioned: 30 July 1943
- Decommissioned: 24 August 1944
- Fate: Surrendered on 8 May 1945. Transferred to French Navy

France
- Name: Laubie
- Namesake: Louis Laubie
- Acquired: 8 May 1945
- Commissioned: 1946
- In service: 1946
- Out of service: 1961
- Identification: Pennant number: S610
- Fate: Broken up in 1963

General characteristics
- Class & type: Type VIIC submarine
- Displacement: 769 tonnes (757 long tons) surfaced; 871 t (857 long tons) submerged
- Length: 67.10 m (220 ft 2 in)
- Beam: 6.20 m (20 ft 4 in)
- Draught: 4.74 m (15 ft 7 in)
- Propulsion: Diesel-electric
- Speed: 17.7 knots (32.8 km/h; 20.4 mph) surfaced; 7.6 knots (14.1 km/h; 8.7 mph) submerged
- Range: 8,500 nmi (15,700 km; 9,800 mi)
- Test depth: 230 m (750 ft)
- Complement: 4 officers, 40–56 enlisted
- Armament: 5 × 53.3 cm (21 in) torpedo tubes (4 bow, 1 stern)

Service record (Kriegsmarine)
- Part of: 8th U-boat Flotilla; 30 July 1943 – 29 February 1944; 6th U-boat Flotilla; 1 March – 24 August 1944
- Identification codes: M 53 610
- Commanders: Oblt.z.S. Hans-Dietrich Wilke; 30 July 1943 – 24 August 1944
- Operations: 5 patrols: 1st patrol: 23 March – 16 April 1944; 2nd patrol: 6 – 15 June 1944; 3rd patrol: 26 – 30 July 1944; 4th patrol: 2 – 6 August 1944; 5th patrol: 8 – 21 August 1944
- Victories: None

German submarine U-766 was a Type VIIC U-boat built for the navy (Kriegsmarine) of Nazi Germany during World War II. She was later incorporated in the French Navy, where she served as Laubie.

== Design ==
German Type VIIC submarines were preceded by the shorter Type VIIB submarines. U-766 had a displacement of 769 tonnes (757 long tons) when at the surface and 871 tonnes (857 long tons) while submerged. She had a total length of 67.10 m (220 ft 2 in), a pressure hull length of 50.50 m (165 ft 8 in), a beam of 6.20 m (20 ft 4 in), a height of 9.60 m (31 ft 6 in), and a draught of 4.74 m (15 ft 7 in). The submarine was powered by two Germaniawerft F46 four-stroke, six-cylinder supercharged diesel engines producing a total of 2,800 to 3,200 metric horsepower (2,060 to 2,350 kW; 2,760 to 3,160 shp) for use while surfaced, two Garbe, Lahmeyer & Co. RP 137/c double-acting electric motors producing a total of 750 metric horsepower (550 kW; 740 shp) for use while submerged. She had two shafts and two 1.23 m (4 ft) propellers. The boat was capable of operating at depths of up to 230 metres (750 ft).

The submarine had a maximum surface speed of 17.7 knots (32.8 km/h; 20.4 mph) and a maximum submerged speed of 7.6 knots (14.1 km/h; 8.7 mph). When submerged, the boat could operate for 80 nautical miles (150 km; 92 mi) at 4 knots (7.4 km/h; 4.6 mph); when surfaced, she could travel 8,500 nautical miles (15,700 km; 9,800 mi) at 10 knots (19 km/h; 12 mph). U-766 was fitted with five 53.3 cm (21 in) torpedo tubes (four fitted at the bow and one at the stern), fourteen torpedoes, one 8.8 cm (3.46 in) SK C/35 naval gun, (220 rounds), one 3.7 cm (1.5 in) Flak M42 and two twin 2 cm (0.79 in) C/30 anti-aircraft guns. The boat had a complement of between forty-four and sixty.

== Service history ==
=== Kriegsmarine ===
U-766 was launched in Wilhelmshaven on 29 May 1943, and was commissioned on 30 July 1943 under the command Oberleutnant zur See Hans-Dietrich Wilke. She was part of the 8th U-boat Flotilla for training until 29 February 1944, when she was transferred to the frontline in the 6th U-boat flotilla.

She sailed five uneventful patrols.

She was de-commissioned at La Rochelle on 24 August 1944, and was surrendered on 8 May 1945.

=== Marine Nationale ===
In May 1945 U-766 was transferred to France and brought into French service under captain Brunet. She was in a poor shape, and pieces of U-415 were used to repair her. In the process, she was also fitted with a snorkel. Her trials were accomplished by a mostly German crew composed of war prisoners, with Wilke acting as first officer.

U-766 was commissioned in 1946 as Laubie (pennant number: S610), in honour of Louis Laubie, an engineer killed in the wreck of the submarine Protée.

Laubie was transferred to Toulon. On 17 July 1950, Laubie was accidentally rammed by the frigate Surprise as she was emerging. She managed to surface and return to Casablanca with a heavily damaged sail.

In 1956, Laubie took part in naval operations of the Suez Crisis as a backup to Créole. On 2 May 1960, Laubie was again rammed, this time by the liner Ville de Marseille, off Algiers. Her stern was damaged over 9 metres. She sustained one last accident in September 1961, when she collided with Espadon at periscope depth. Severely damaged, Laubie was decommissioned, and broken up in 1963.

== Bibliography ==
- Busch, Rainer; Röll, Hans-Joachim (1999). German U-boat commanders of World War II : a biographical dictionary. Translated by Brooks, Geoffrey. London, Annapolis, Md: Greenhill Books, Naval Institute Press. ISBN 1-55750-186-6.
- Busch, Rainer; Röll, Hans-Joachim (1999). Deutsche U-Boot-Verluste von September 1939 bis Mai 1945 [German U-boat losses from September 1939 to May 1945]. Der U-Boot-Krieg (in German). Vol. IV. Hamburg, Berlin, Bonn: Mittler. ISBN 3-8132-0514-2.
- Gröner, Erich; Jung, Dieter; Maass, Martin (1991). German Warships 1815–1945, U-boats and Mine Warfare Vessels. Vol. 2. Translated by Thomas, Keith; Magowan, Rachel. London: Conway Maritime Press. ISBN 0-85177-593-4.
- Sharpe, Peter (1998). U-Boat Fact File. Great Britain: Midland Publishing. ISBN 1-85780-072-9.
