= French submarine Actéon =

French Navy submarine

Actéon
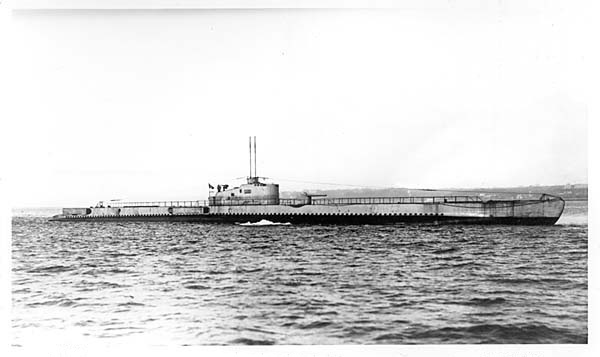
- Actéon's sister ship Ajax in 1930

History

France
- Name: Actéon
- Namesake: Actaeon, a Theban hero in Greek mythology
- Operator: French Navy
- Builder: Ateliers et Chantiers de la Loire, Saint-Nazaire, France
- Laid down: 20 July 1927
- Launched: 10 April 1929
- Commissioned: 18 December 1931
- Home port: Brest, France
- Fate: Sunk 8 November 1942

General characteristics
- Class & type: Redoutable-class submarine
- Displacement: 1,572 tonnes (1,547 long tons) (surfaced); 2,092 tonnes (2,059 long tons) (submerged)
- Length: 92.3 m (302 ft 10 in)
- Beam: 8.1 m (26 ft 7 in)
- Draft: 4.4 m (14 ft 5 in) (surfaced)
- Propulsion: 2 × diesel engines, 6,000 hp (4,474 kW); 2 × electric motors, 2,250 hp (1,678 kW)
- Speed: 17.5 kn (32.4 km/h; 20.1 mph) (surfaced); 10 kn (19 km/h; 12 mph) (submerged)
- Range: 14,000 nmi (26,000 km; 16,000 mi) at 7 kn (13 km/h; 8.1 mph) (surfaced); 10,000 nmi (19,000 km; 12,000 mi) at 10 kn (19 km/h; 12 mph) (surfaced); 4,000 nmi (7,400 km; 4,600 mi) at 17 kn (31 km/h; 20 mph) (surfaced); 90 nmi (170 km; 100 mi) at 7 kn (13 km/h; 8.1 mph) (submerged)
- Test depth: 80 m (262 ft)
- Complement: 5 officers (6 in operations); 66 men
- Armament: 11 torpedo tubes; 1 × 100 mm (3.9 in) gun; 1 × 13.2 mm (0.5 in) machine gun

Actéon was a French Navy Redoutable-class submarine of the M6 series commissioned in 1932. She participated in World War II, first on the side of the Allies from 1939 to June 1940, then in the navy of Vichy France. She was sunk in November 1942.

== Characteristics ==
Profile of Casabianca, sister ship of Actéon

Actéon was part of a fairly homogeneous series of 31 deep-sea patrol submarines also called "1,500-tonners" because of their displacement. All entered service between 1931 and 1939.

The Redoutable-class submarines were 92.3 metres (302 ft 10 in) long and 8.1 metres (26 ft 7 in) in beam and had a draft of 4.4 metres (14 ft 5 in). They could dive to a depth of 80 metres (262 ft). They displaced 1,572 tonnes (1,547 long tons) on the surface and 2,082 tonnes (2,049 long tons) underwater. Propelled on the surface by two diesel engines producing a combined 6,000 horsepower (4,474 kW), they had a maximum speed of 18.6 knots (34.4 km/h; 21.4 mph). When submerged, their two electric motors produced a combined 2,250 horsepower (1,678 kW) and allowed them to reach 10 knots (19 km/h; 12 mph). Also called "deep-cruising submarines", their range on the surface was 10,000 nautical miles (19,000 km; 12,000 mi) at 10 knots (19 km/h; 12 mph). Underwater, they could travel 100 nautical miles (190 km; 120 mi) at 5 knots (9.3 km/h; 5.8 mph).

== Construction and commissioning ==
Laid down at Ateliers et Chantiers de la Loire in Saint-Nazaire, France, on 20 July 1927 with the hull number Q149, Actéon was launched on 10 April 1929. She was commissioned on 18 December 1931.

== Service history ==
=== World War II ===
==== French Navy ====
At the start of World War II in September 1939, Actéon was assigned to the 3rd Submarine Division based at Toulon, France. Her sister ships Achéron, Fresnel, and Protée made up the rest of the division. In December 1939, Actéon joined Fresnel and their sister ships Le Héros and Redoutable in searching the central Atlantic Ocean for the German supply ship Altmark. At the beginning of February 1940, the 3rd Submarine Division transferred briefly to Casablanca in French Morocco to patrol off the Canary Islands, where the Allies believed that German cargo ships had taken refuge at the beginning of the war and were serving as supply ships for German U-boats.

On 12 April 1940, Actéon was transferred to the Mediterranean Sea, based first at Bizerte in Tunisia and then at Beirut in the French Mandate for Syria and Lebanon, from which she operated under the command of the British Commander-in-Chief, Mediterranean Fleet, Admiral Andrew Cunningham, at Alexandria, Egypt. She patrolled in the Dodecanese between Leros and Rhodes.

German ground forces advanced into France on 10 May 1940, beginning the Battle of France, and Italy declared war on France on 10 June 1940 and joined the invasion. The Battle of France ended in France's defeat and armistices with Germany on 22 June 1940 and with Italy on 24 June, both of which went into effect on 25 June 1940. Actéon was recalled to Beirut on 25 June.

==== Vichy France ====
After France's surrender, Actéon served in the naval forces of Vichy France. Her batteries and those of Acheron were in poor condition, but repairing or replacing them was impossible at Beirut. Escorted by the netlayer Le Gladiateur, the two submarines departed Beirut on 16 October 1940 bound for Toulon, which they reached on 24 October 1940. Actéon then was placed under guard at Toulon in accordance with the terms of the armistice.

In 1941, Actéon was transferred to Dakar in Senegal. While returning to Dakar from a reconnaissance mission she attempted on 27 and 28 July 1941 to intercept and seize the Norwegian cargo ship Lidward, which had escaped internment at Dakar, but she mistakenly began tracking a different ship and failed to find Lidward. A British aircraft sighted Actéon and ordered her to stop, but she ignored the order and proceeded to Dakar.

By 1 January 1942, Actéon had been reassigned to Casablanca, where she formed the 5th Submarine Division with her sister ships Fresnel, Henri Poincaré, and Pascal. By 1 November 1942, only Fresnel was still assigned to the division with her.

The submarines of the 5th Submarine Division received orders to proceed to Toulon on 8 November 1942 to undergo a major overhaul, but Actéon and Pascal were still in French North Africa at Oran in Algeria that day when Allied forces landed on the coast of North Africa in Operation Torch. At 02:05 on 8 November, Actéon and Fresnel received orders to put to sea and oppose the landings, and they got underway between 03:15 and 03:45. Actéon soon reached her patrol area off the coast of Algeria east of Cape Falcon.

==== Loss ====
At the end of the day on 8 November 1942, Actéon sighted the British Royal Navy escort aircraft carriers HMS Biter and HMS Dasher off Cape Falcon. She penetrated their outer escort screen, then surfaced so that she could achieve a better attack position. As she approached the carriers on the surface, the British destroyer HMS Westcott sighted her at 21:00 at a range of 900 metres (980 yd). Actéon submerged immediately. At 21:11, Westcott dropped several depth charges and sank Actéon off Arzew, Algeria, at 36°48′N 000°59′W with the loss of her entire crew of 65.
