= French submarine Espadon (S637) =

Narval-class submarine (1960–1986)

Coordinates: 47.275512°N 2.198999°W

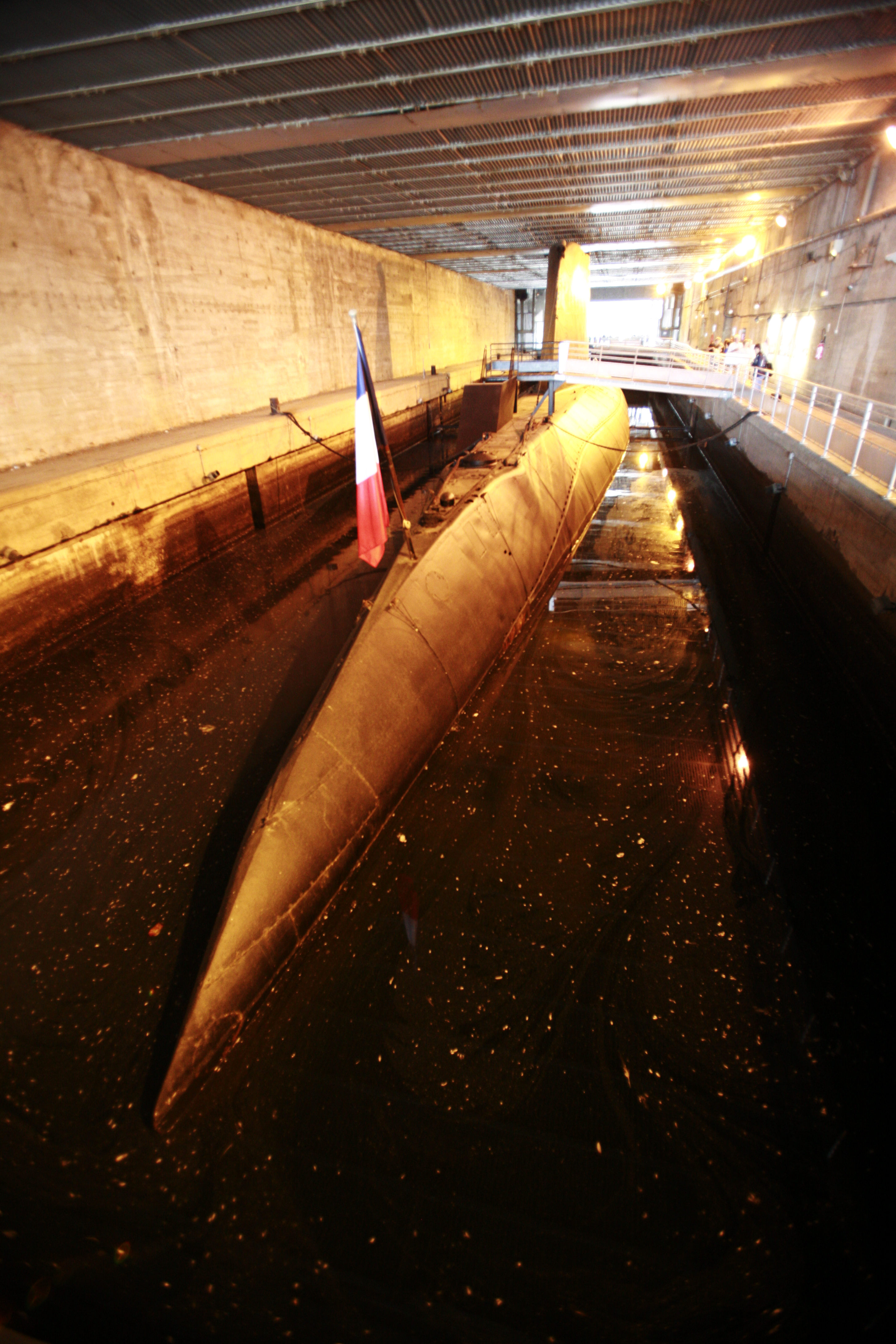
- Espadon as a museum ship in Saint Nazaire

History

France
- Name: Espadon
- Launched: 15 September 1958
- Commissioned: 1960
- Decommissioned: 23 August 1986
- Home port: Lorient
- Identification: Pennant number: S637
- Status: Museum ship since 1987

General characteristics
- Displacement: 1635 tons surfaced, 1910 tons submerged
- Length: 78.4 m
- Beam: 7.8 m
- Draft: 5.2 m
- Propulsion: 2 shafts, 2 × 7 cylinder diesel engines (4400 hp), 2 electric motors (5000 hp), re engined with new diesels in 1965-68
- Speed: 16 knots (30 km/h; 18 mph) surfaced; 18 knots (33 km/h; 21 mph) submerged
- Range: 15,000 nautical miles (28,000 km) at 8 knots (15 km/h; 9.2 mph)
- Test depth: 400 metres
- Complement: 63
- Armament: 8 × 550 mm torpedo tubes - 6 bow& 2 stern, 14 torpedoes carried

Espadon was a Narval-class submarine of the French Navy. Along with sister boat Marsouin, the boat was the first French submarine to steam under sea ice. The boat is currently a museum ship.

== Career ==
Espadon was commissioned in 1960.

In 1961, as she served as a target for mock torpedo exercises, Espadon was hit by two inert torpedoes, damaging her propeller. She nevertheless managed to surface, but had to be towed to Toulon.

In September of the same year, while cruising underwater, Espadon collided with the submarine Laubie, sustaining extensive damage to her bow and to the front of her sail.

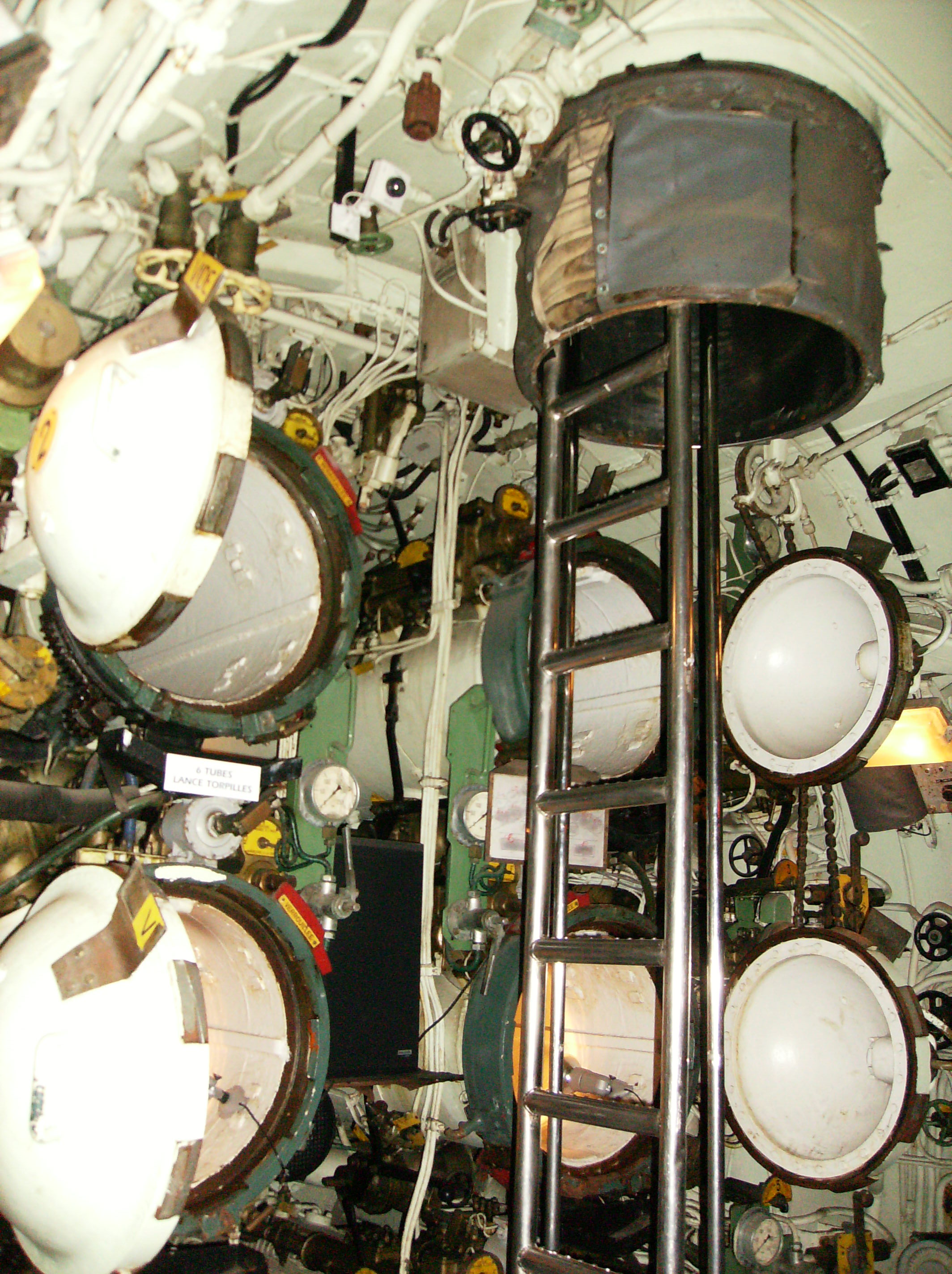
Torpedo room of Espadon

On 13 August 1963 a fire in the torpedo room wounded and intoxicated four sailors, one of whom later died of his wounds.

In May 1964, Espadon and Marsouin steamed under sea ice in the Norwegian Sea as far as 70° north.

Espadon undertook significant modifications from 1966 to 1968, notably upgrading the boat's sonar, sail and rudders.

Espadon has been a museum ship at the "ville-port" of Saint-Nazaire in the German-built submarine base since 1987.

== See also ==
- List of submarines of France

== Sources and references ==
- Sous-marin d'escadre Espadon, netmarine.net (in French)
