= Creola =

Creola may refer to the following places in the United States:

- Creola, Alabama, an incorporated city in Mobile County
- Creola, Louisiana, an incorporated village in Grant Parish
- Creola, Ohio, an unincorporated community in Vinton County

== See also ==
- Creole (disambiguation)
- Lethe creola, a species of brush-footed butterfly
