= Crioulo =

The Portuguese word crioulo (crioula, crioulos, crioulas) may refer to:

- In Brazil, a person of African ancestry
- A creole language, especially one of the Portuguese-based creole languages
- Criollo horse, also known as a crioulo horse.
- Crioulo cattle, Brazilian Criollo cattle breeds

== See also ==
- Creole (disambiguation)
- Criollo (disambiguation)
