= French submarine Créole =

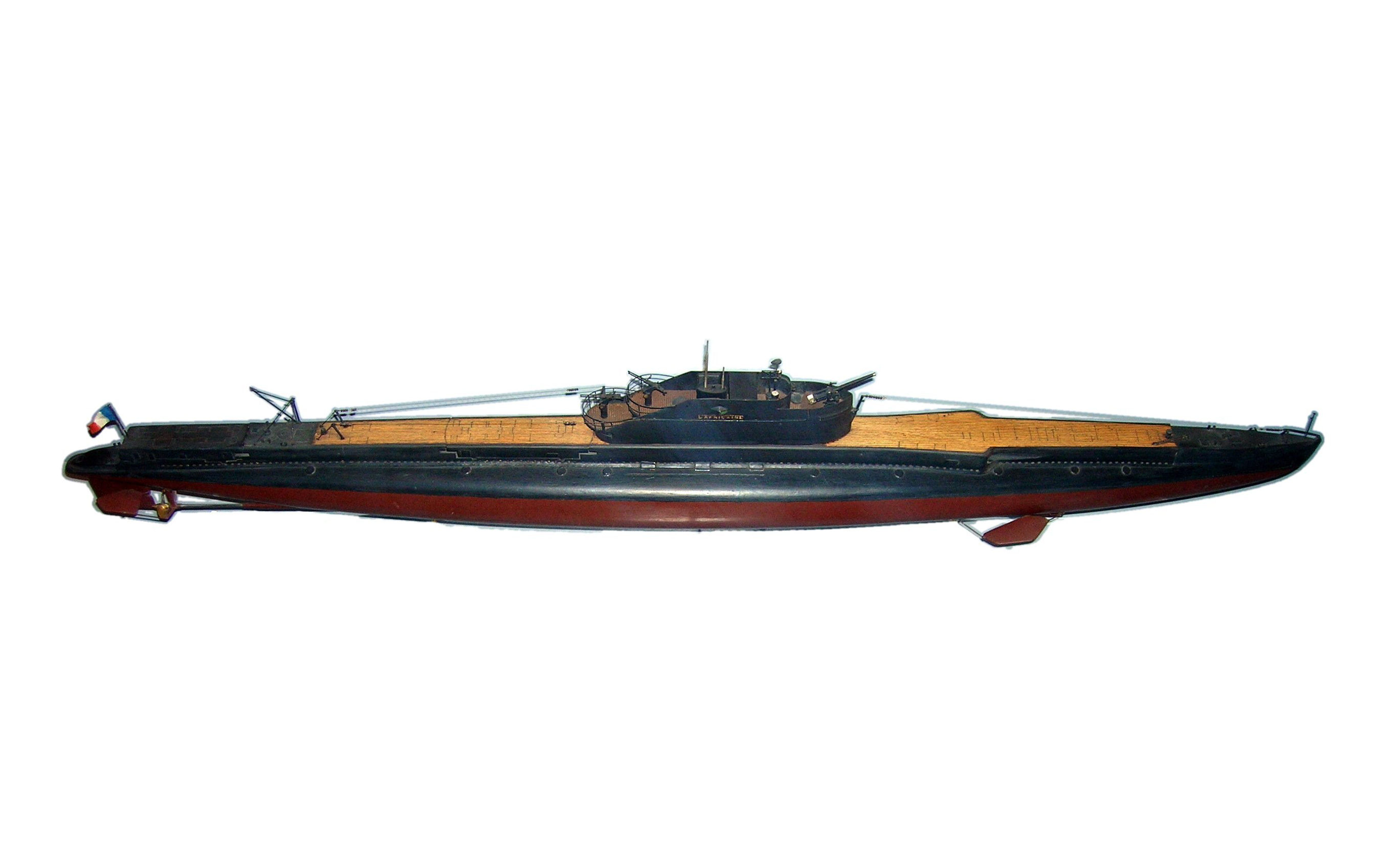
- Model of Africaine, sister ship of Créole.

History

France
- Name: Créole
- Namesake: "Creol"
- Builder: Le Havre
- Laid down: 1937
- Launched: 8 June 1940
- Commissioned: 1 April 1949
- Fate: Scrapped 1963

General characteristics
- Class & type: Aurore-class submarine
- Displacement: 900 tonnes (890 long tons) surfaced; 1,170 tonnes (1,150 long tons) submerged
- Length: 73.5 m (241 ft 2 in)
- Beam: 6.5 m (21 ft 4 in)
- Draught: 4.2 m (13 ft 9 in)
- Propulsion: Diesel: 2,200 kW (3,000 shp); 1,000 kW (1,400 shp) electrical
- Speed: 15 knots (28 km/h; 17 mph) surfaced; 9 knots (17 km/h; 10 mph) submerged
- Range: 5,600 nmi (10,400 km; 6,400 mi) at 10 knots (19 km/h; 12 mph); 2,250 nmi (4,170 km; 2,590 mi) at 15 knots; 80 nmi (150 km; 92 mi) submerged at 5 knots (9.3 km/h; 5.8 mph)
- Test depth: 100 m (330 ft)
- Armament: 1 × 100 mm deck gun; 2 × 13.2 mm machine guns; 9 × 550 mm torpedo tubes

Créole (Q193) was an Aurore-class submarine of the French Navy.

== Construction and career ==
Créole was launched on 8 June 1940 at Le Havre, France. To avoid capture by German ground forces advancing on le Havre during the Battle of France, Créole, still unfinished, was towed to La Pallice, and on 18 June 1940 was taken in tow from La Pallice to Swansea in South Wales. France surrendered to Germany and Italy on 22 June 1940, with hostilities ending on 25 June, and on 1 July 1940, the British took custody of Créole during Operation Catapult.

Créole was completed after the war and commissioned in the French Navy on 1 April 1949. Her silhouette departed from her pre-war design because of the installation of a snorkel and her completion with a sail instead of a conning tower.

Créole took part in the Suez Crisis in 1956, and sustained damage in a friendly fire incident when airplanes from the French aircraft carrier Arromanches attacked her by mistake. While she was surfacing on 28 March 1962 during a training cruise, she collided with the French packet boat Sidi Ferruch — which was transporting 800 French troops home from Algeria — off Toulon, France, severely damaging her sail. The dispatch boat Amiral Charner assisted her in reaching port.

Créole eventually was decommissioned, and she was broken up in 1963.

== See also ==
- List of submarines of France
