= Escal'Atlantic =

Museum in France

Escal' Atlantic
- Escal' Atlantic
- Location within France
- Established: 22 April 2000
- Location: Boulevard de la Légion d'Honneur, Saint-Nazaire, France
- Coordinates: 47.27623°N 2.20301°W
- Visitors: 1,300,000 since opening
- Owners: Saint-Nazaire Tourisme & Patrimoine
- Parking: Yes
- Website: Official website

Escal'Atlantic, is a museum that explores the historic ocean liner experience in Saint-Nazaire, France. The museum is found inside the former German World War II submarine pen in the harbour of the city port. It tells the history of the ocean liner, allowing the visitor to wander the insides of an "ocean liner" from the past by visiting areas of a vessel and by means of artefacts.

== History ==
Prior to the Second World War, Saint-Nazaire was the transatlantic harbour for passenger liners travelling to Cuba, Mexico and Panama. After the fall of France in 1940, the Germans built a huge concrete submarine pen on the site of the old docks and buildings in 1941, allowing the U-boats easier access to the Battle of the Atlantic.

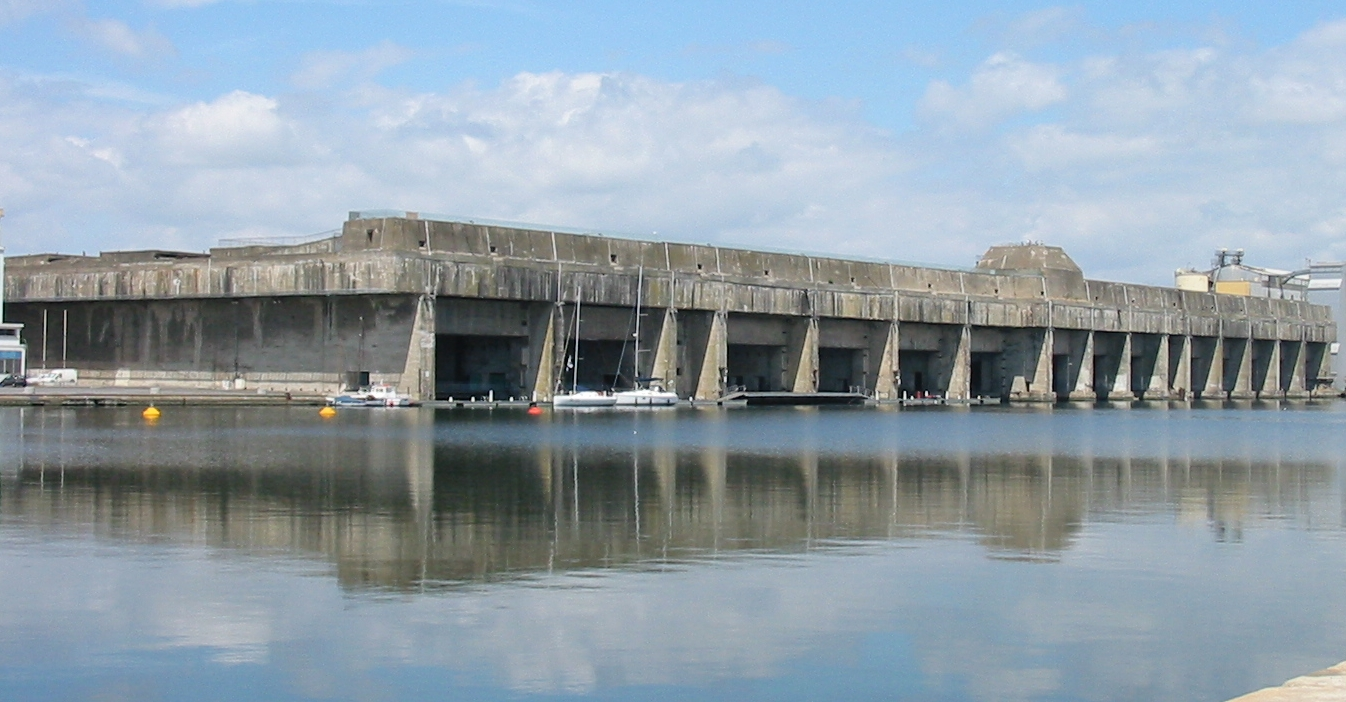
Modern day view of the Kriegsmarine Saint-Nazaire submarine base and site of the Escal'Atlantic museum

== Museum ==
The museum opened on 22 April 2000. A total of 3,700 m^{2} (40,000 sq ft) of the former submarine base has been constructed into the Escal'Atlantic museum. The museum consists of a self-guided walking tour of around a 1 ½ hours through twenty areas of a traditional liner from the 1900s to the 1960s. The tour includes both the public areas such as staterooms, steerage, hairdressers, music rooms, a piano bar and dining room and the inner workings of a liner such as the engine room and captain's bridge. The museum has interactive features, audiovisual displays and "hands-on" devices, designed for family visits. Over 200 artefacts have been sourced from various ocean liners including the SS Normandie launched in 1935, and the SS France from 1961. In October 2012, the Escal'Atlantic closed briefly to renovate and redesign the walking tour through the museum and reopened on 1 July 2013.

The museum is closed during certain months; dates and times of operation are given on the website.
