= Aurore-class submarine =

French Naval submarine class

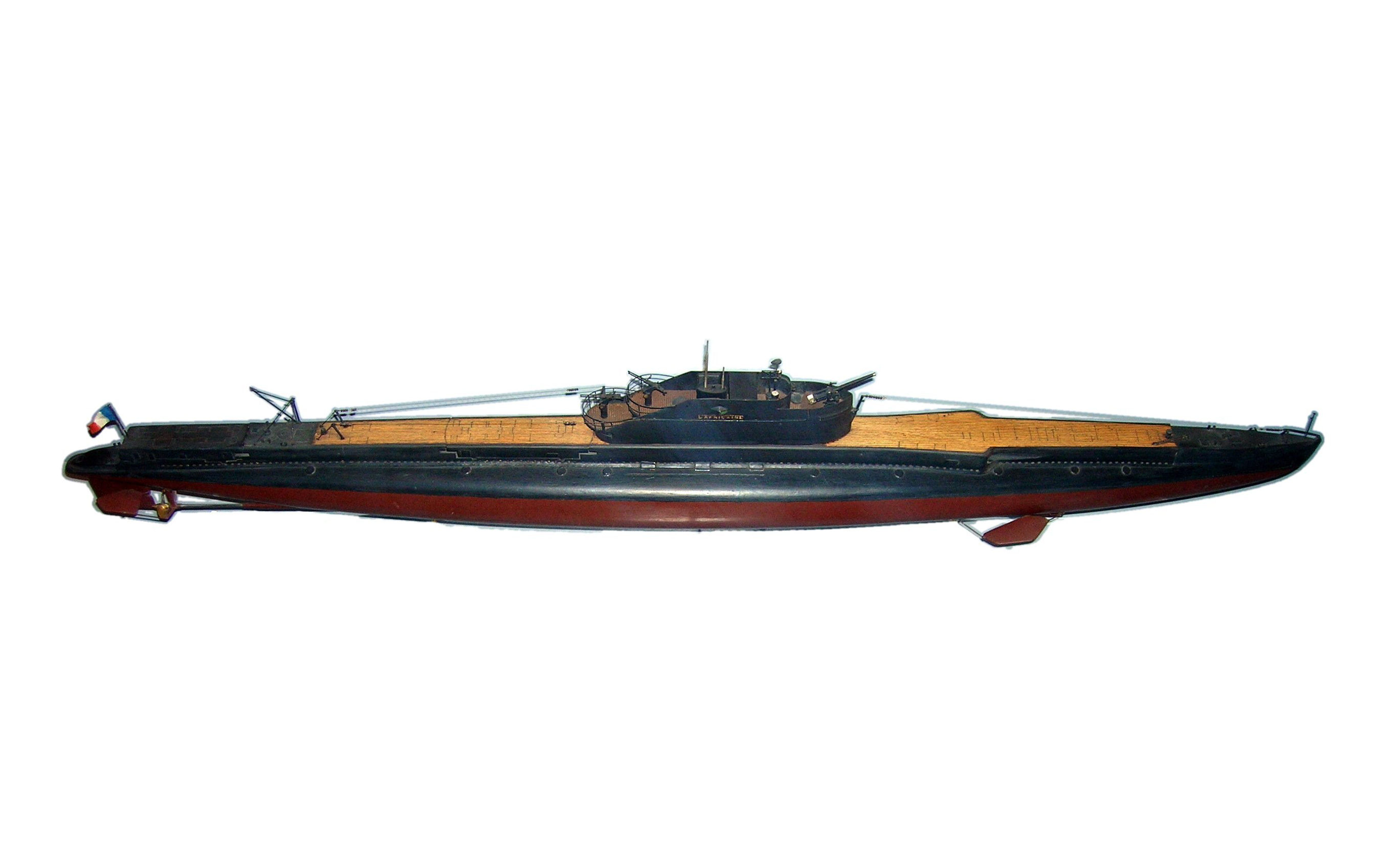
- Model of Africaine

Class overview
- Name: Aurore
- Builders: Le Havre, Nantes, Toulon, Chalon-sur-Saône, Rouen
- Operators: French Navy; Kriegsmarine
- Preceded by: Minerve class
- Succeeded by: Narval class
- In service: 1939–1962
- Planned: 15
- Completed: 7
- Canceled: 8

General characteristics
- Type: Submarine
- Displacement: 900 tonnes (890 long tons) surfaced; 1,170 tonnes (1,150 long tons) submerged
- Length: 73.5 m (241 ft 2 in)
- Beam: 6.5 m (21 ft 4 in)
- Draught: 4.2 m (13 ft 9 in)
- Propulsion: Diesel: 2,200 kW (3,000 shp); 1,000 kW (1,400 hp) electrical
- Speed: 15 knots (28 km/h; 17 mph) surfaced; 9 knots (17 km/h; 10 mph) submerged
- Range: 5,600 nmi (10,400 km; 6,400 mi) at 10 knots (19 km/h; 12 mph); 80 nmi (150 km; 92 mi) at 5 knots (9.3 km/h) submerged
- Test depth: 100 m (330 ft)
- Armament: 1 × 100 mm (3.9 in) deck gun; 2 × 13.2 mm (0.52 in) machine guns; 9 × 550 mm (21.7 in) torpedo tubes (4 bow internal, 3 external amidships, and 2 stern external)

The Aurore class was a class of fifteen coastal submarines designed for the French Navy. The prototype – Aurore – was authorised in 1934, the next four in 1937, a further four in 1938, two in 1938, and a final four subsequently. Some of the ships were captured by Nazi Germany after the Fall of France, most of them in an unfinished state; two were intended to be completed for the German Navy, Africaine becoming UF-1 and Favorite becoming UF-2, but only the first was completed during the World War II, the second reverting to French control while still uncompleted.

Five of the submarines, Andromède, Astrée, Africaine, Artémis and Créole, were completed after the war, were commissioned in the French Navy and served into the 1960s. Andromède, Artémis and Créole were fitted with GUPPY sails and submarine snorkels.

== Ships ==
- Aurore (Q192)

Builder: Toulon
Ordered: 1934
Laid down: December 1935
Launched: 26 July 1939
Fate: Scuttled during the scuttling of the French fleet in Toulon on 27 November 1942

- Créole (Q193)

Builder: Le Havre
Ordered: 1937
Laid down: December 1937
Launched: 8 June 1940
Fate: Broken up in 1961

- Bayadère (Q194)

Builder: Le Havre
Ordered: 1937
Laid down: December 1937
Launched: -
Fate: Broken up in June 1940 still on keel, never finished

- Favorite (Q195)

Builder: Rouen
Ordered: 1937
Laid down: December 1937
Launched: September 1938
Fate: Taken by the German, becoming UF-2; scuttled in 1945 at Gotenhafen

- Africaine (Q196)

Builder: Rouen
Ordered: 1937
Laid down: December 1937
Launched:7 December 1946
Fate: Broken up in 1963

- Astrée (Q200)

Builder: Nantes
Ordered: 1938
Laid down: November 1938
Launched: 3 May 1946
Fate: Broken up in 1965

- Andromède (Q201)

Builder: Nantes
Ordered: 1938
Laid down: November 1938
Launched: 17 November 1949
Fate: Broken up in 1965

- Antigone (Q202)

Builder: Chalon-sur-Saône
Ordered: 1938
Laid down: November 1938
Launched: -
Fate: Broken up in 1940 still on keel, never finished

- Andromaque (Q203)

Builder: Rouen
Ordered: 1938
Laid down: November 1938
Launched: -
Fate: Broken up in 1940 still on keel, never finished

- Artémis (Q206)

Builder: Le Havre
Ordered: 1939
Laid down: May 1939
Launched: 28 June 1942
Fate: Broken up in 1967

- Armide (Q207)

Builder: Rouen
Ordered: 1938
Laid down: May 1939
Launched: -
Fate: Broken up in 1940 still on keel, never finished

- Hermione (Q211)

Builder: Le Havre
Ordered: 1939
Launched:
Fate: Broken up on keel while only 8% built

- Gorgone (Q212)

Builder: Le Havre
Ordered:
Launched:
Fate: Broken up on keel while only 5% built

- Clorinde (Q213)

Builder: Nantes
Ordered:
Launched:
Fate: Broken up in 1940 still on keel, never finished

- Cornélie (Q214)

Builder:
Ordered:
Launched:
Fate: Keel never laid

== See also ==
- List of submarines of France
- French submarines of World War II

Equivalent submarines of the same era

- O 21 class
- T class
- Brin class
- Orzeł class
- Mackerel class
- S class
- Type VII
