= French submarine Protée (1930) =

Redoutable-class submarine

Protée
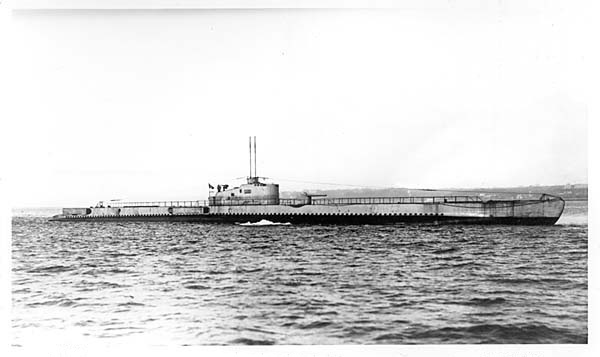
- Ajax, sister ship of Protée

History

France
- Name: Protée
- Namesake: Proteus, an early sea-god or god of rivers in Greek mythology
- Laid down: 4 October 1928
- Launched: 31 July 1930
- Commissioned: 1 November 1932
- Fate: Sunk on 20 December 1943

General characteristics
- Class & type: Redoutable-class submarine
- Displacement: 1500 tonnes (surfaced); 2000 tonnes (submerged)
- Length: 92.30 m (302.8 ft)
- Propulsion: 2 diesels, of 4,300 hp; 2 electric engines of 1,200 hp
- Speed: 20 knots (37 km/h; 23 mph) (surfaced); 10 knots (submerged)
- Range: 14,000 nautical miles (26,000 km) at 7 knots (13 km/h; 8.1 mph), 10,000 nautical miles (20,000 km) at 10 knots (19 km/h; 12 mph); 4,000 nautical miles (7,000 km) at 17 knots (31 km/h; 20 mph); 90 nautical miles (170 km) at 7 knots (submerged)
- Test depth: 80 metres
- Complement: 5 officers (6 in operations); 79 men
- Armament: 11 torpedo tubes; 1 × 100 mm gun; 1 × 13.2 mm machine gun

Protée (Q155) was a Redoutable-class submarine of the French Navy. The class is also known as the "1500-ton class" and were termed in French French: « de grande patrouille».

== History ==
=== Development ===
Protée was one of 31 Redoutable-class submarines, also designated as the 1500 ton boats because of their displacement. The class entered service between 1931 and 1939.

92.3 m (302 ft 10 in) long, with a beam of 8.2 m (26 ft 11 in) and a draught of 4.9 m (16 ft 1 in), she could dive up to 80 m (260 ft). Redoutable-class submarines had a surfaced displacement of 1,572 tonnes (1,547 long tons) and a submerged displacement of 2,082 tonnes (2,049 long tons). Propulsion while surfaced was provided by two 6,000 hp (4,474 kW) diesel motors, with a maximum speed of 18.6 knots (34.4 km/h; 21.4 mph). The submarines' electrical propulsion allowed them to attain speeds of 10 knots (19 km/h; 12 mph) while submerged. Designated as "grand cruise submarines" (French: « sous-marins de grande croisière »), their surfaced range was 10,000 nautical miles (20,000 km) at 10 knots (20 km/h), and 14,000 nautical miles (30,000 km) at 7 knots (10 km/h), with a submerged range of 100 nautical miles (0 km) at 5 knots (10 km/h).

Laid down on 4 October 1928, Protée was launched on 31 July 1930 and commissioned on 1 November 1932.

=== Second World War ===
At the beginning of the Second World War Protée was assigned to the 3rd Submarine Division, based at Toulon, alongside her sisters Achéron, Fresnel and Actéon. At the beginning of February 1940 the 3rd Submarine Division was briefly transferred to Casablanca to carry out surveillance of the Canary Islands, where a couple of German cargo ships were present. The submarine division was then assigned to the Mediterranean theatre on 12 April, first at Bizerte then, without the Fresnel, at Beirut, under the authority the British commander-in-chief in Alexandria. Protée took part in several patrols in the Dodecanese until the signing of the armistice between France and Germany on 22 June 1940. On 25 June, the date the armistice came into force, the captain of Protée ignored an order to return to Beirut, and instead sailed to Alexandria, becoming part of Force X. The captain was chastised for this incident.

Force X continued in action with the Allies until June 1943, when after several months of negotiations with the French Forces of Africa, to form the French Forces of the Liberation. Protée left Alexandria on 18 June to sail to Oran, departing Oran during November. On 22 November, during the boat's first mission, she torpedoed a German cargo ship off Agay, but failed to sink her.

On 18 December 1943 Protée, under the command of Capitaine de corvette Georges Millé, sailed to patrol off Marseille but never returned. The French Navy long thought that the loss of Protée was due to a surface engagement with a German naval vessel. However a dive conducted in 1995 confirmed the theory developed by the United States Navy in the 1950s that the submarine's loss was caused by striking a mine. There was no mention of an engagement with an Allied submarine in the German naval archives.

Protée disappeared on 20 December 1943 with the loss of all hands, including three Royal Navy liaison personnel. The later submarine Laubie was named after the Protée's chief engineer, Louis Laubie.

== Discovery of the wreck ==
The wreck was discovered on 6 April 1995 at 43°04′16″N 5°32′14″E by the COMEX vessel Rémora 2000. Analyses of the damage indicated that she was probably lost after hitting a mine. The wreck was declared a war memorial by the Navy.
