= French submarine Africaine (Q196) =

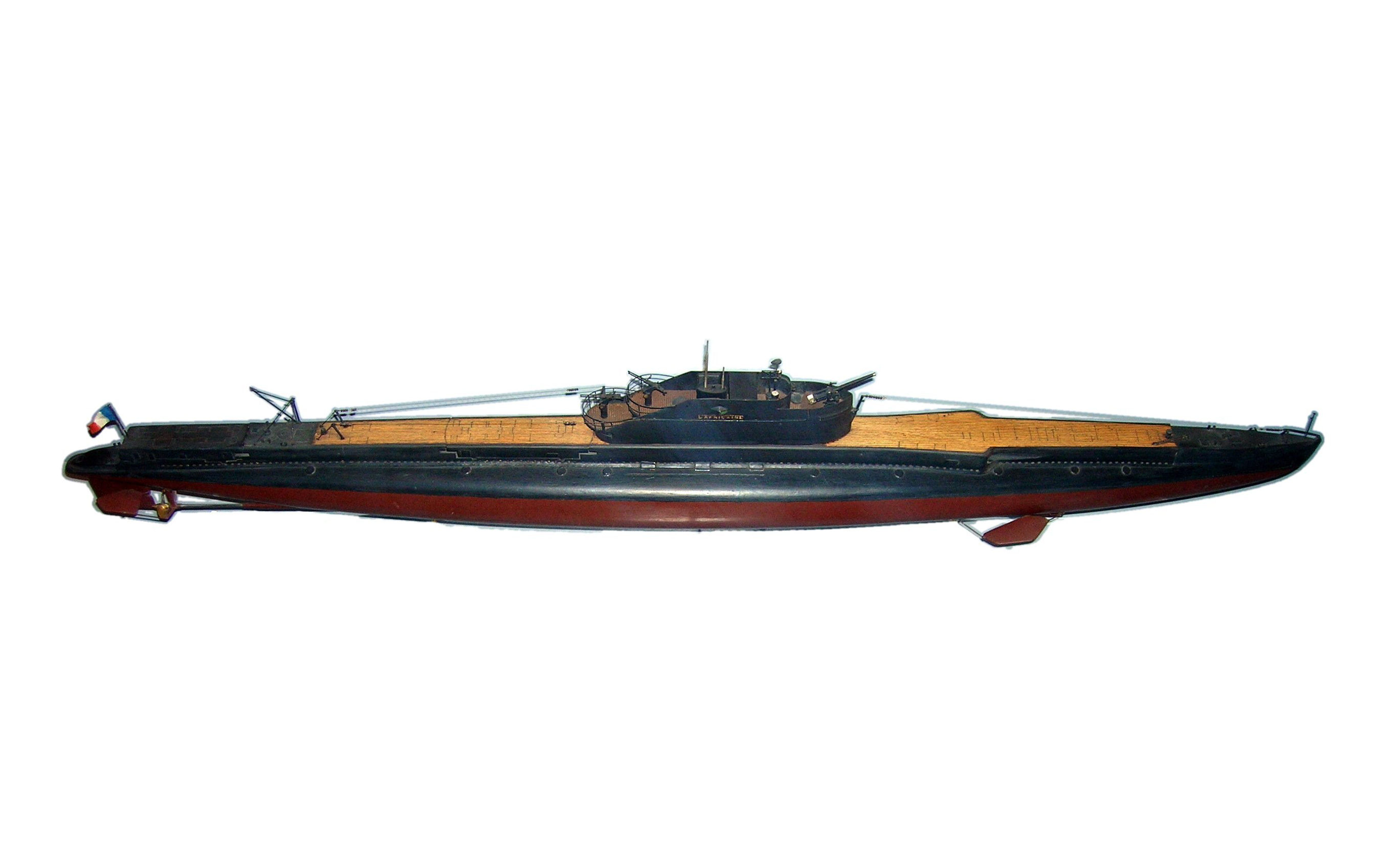
- Model of Africaine

History

France
- Name: Africaine
- Namesake: "African"
- Ordered: 1937
- Builder: Rouen
- Laid down: December 1937
- Fate: Incomplete, captured by German in June 1940

Nazi Germany
- Name: UF-1
- Acquired: June 1940
- Fate: Captured by Allies

France
- Name: Africaine
- Launched: 7 December 1946
- Commissioned: October 1949
- Decommissioned: 1961
- Stricken: 28 February 1963
- Fate: Scrapped

General characteristics
- Class & type: Aurore-class submarine
- Displacement: 900 tonnes (890 long tons) surfaced; 1,170 tonnes (1,150 long tons) submerged
- Length: 73.5 m (241 ft)
- Beam: 6.5 m (21 ft)
- Draught: 4.2 m (14 ft)
- Propulsion: Diesel: 3000 shp (2237 KW); 1400 shp (1044 KW) electrical
- Speed: 15 knots (28 km/h; 17 mph) surfaced; 9 knots submerged
- Range: 5,600 nmi (10,400 km; 6,400 mi) at 10 knots (19 km/h; 12 mph); 2,250 nmi (4,170 km; 2,590 mi) at 15 knots (28 km/h; 17 mph); 80 nmi (150 km; 92 mi) at 5 knots (9.3 km/h; 5.8 mph) submerged
- Test depth: 100 m (330 ft)
- Armament: 1 × 100 mm (3.9 in) deck gun; 2 × 13.2 mm (0.52 in) machine guns; 9 × 550 mm (22 in) torpedo tubes

Africaine (Q196) ("African") was an Aurore-class submarine of the French Navy.

Still incomplete, she was captured by the Germans in June 1940 during World War II. She was renamed UF-1 on 13 May 1941 by the Kriegsmarine, but never completed during the German occupation of France.

She was recaptured, completed under her original name, and launched on 7 December 1946. Africaine was taken out of service in 1961 and was stricken on 28 February 1963 as Q334.

== See also ==
- List of submarines of France
