= French aviso Montmirail =

Aviso of the French Navy

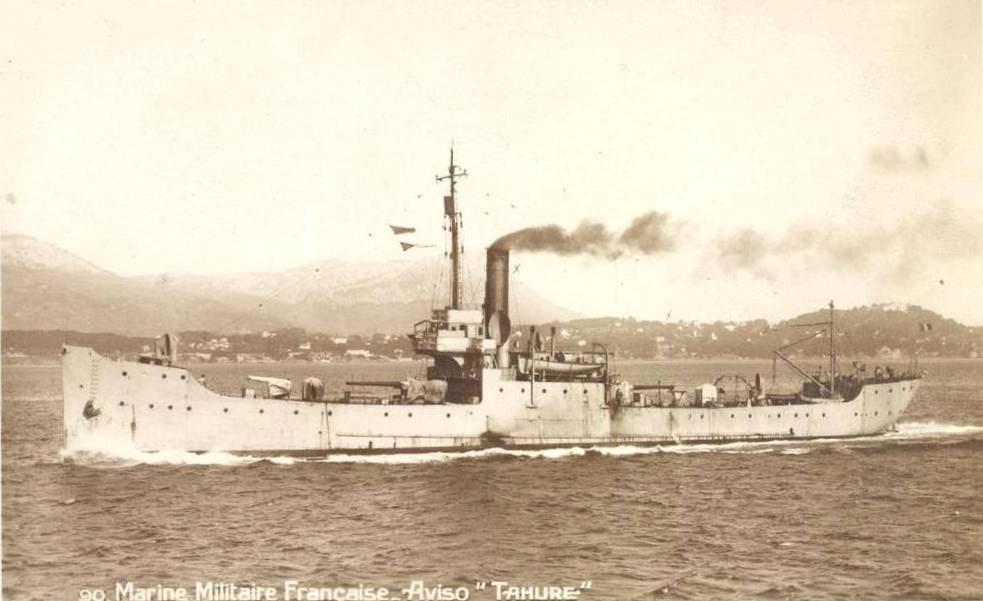
- Sister ship Tahure in 1939

History

France
- Name: Montmirail
- Builder: Chantiers de la Méditerranée, La Seyne-sur-Mer
- Launched: 12 September 1920
- Completed: 26 April 1922
- Stricken: 29 October 1933
- Fate: Sold to be broken up on 25 April 1935

General characteristics (as built)
- Displacement: 850 long tons (864 t) standard
- Length: 74.9 m (245 ft 9 in) o/a
- Beam: 8.7 m (28 ft 7 in)
- Draught: 3.2 m (10 ft 6 in)
- Installed power: Guyot du Temple boilers 3,000 shp (2,200 kW)
- Propulsion: Parsons steam turbines, 2 shafts
- Speed: 18 knots (21 mph; 33 km/h)
- Range: 3,000 nmi (5,600 km; 3,500 mi) at 11 knots (20 km/h; 13 mph)
- Complement: 103
- Armament: 2 × single 138.6 mm (5 in)/55 Modèle 1910 guns; 1 × single 75 mm (3 in)/62.5 Modèle 1908 gun; 4 × single 8 mm (0.31 in)/80 Modèle 1914 Hotchkiss guns; 2 × depth charge throwers

Montmirail was an aviso of the Arras class, also known as the Amiens class, ordered by the French Navy at the end of the First World War. Designed as fast escorts, the ships had a primary armament of two 138.6 mm (5 in) guns and depth charges. Launched in 1920, the vessel was initially based in Cherbourg for trials before joining the Escadre de Méditerranée (Mediterranean Squadron) to combat the Red Sea slave trade. In 1925 and 1926, the aviso served as part of a blockade of the Morocco coast during the Rif War alongside sister ships Amiens and Calais. After further service in the Mediterranean Sea, the ship was retired from service in the region in 1931. In 1935, Montmirail was sold and broken up.

== Design and development ==
Montmirail was a member of the Arras class, also known as the Amiens class, a class of thirty fast avisos or sloops, designed to serve as escort ships and ordered under the 1916 and 1917 French Navy's construction plans. The ships were similar in layout to three-island merchant ships with a high bow, which meant that they sailed well in heavy seas, keeping their crews dry. They were considered roomy and comfortable ships, although the weight of their armament and superstructure meant that they rolled heavily.

The aviso had a length of 72 m (236 ft 2.6 in) between perpendiculars and 74.9 m (245 ft 8.8 in) overall, with a beam of 8.7 m (28 ft 6.5 in) and draught of 3.2 m (10 ft 6.0 in). Normal displacement was 850 long tons (860 t). Power was provided by two Guyot du Temple water-tube boilers feeding two sets of Parsons geared steam turbines rated at 5,000 shaft horsepower (3,700 kW). These drove two shafts and exhausted through two funnels. Design speed was 18 knots (33 km/h; 21 mph), and a total of 200 long tons (200 t) of coal was carried, which gave a design range of 3,000 nautical miles (5,600 km; 3,500 mi) at 11 knots (20 km/h; 13 mph). The ship had a complement of four officers and 99 enlisted crew.

Montmirail had a main armament consisting of two single 138.6 mm (5 in) 55 calibre Modèle 1910 guns. Each could typically fire a 39.5 kg (87 lb) shell at a rate of five or six rounds per minute. They were mounted on the centreline, one forward and the other aft of the superstructure. These were replaced by larger 145 mm (6 in) guns during trials. A single 75 mm (3 in), 62.5 calibre anti-aircraft gun and four 8 mm (0.31 in) 80 calibre Modèle 1914 Hotchkiss machine guns were also carried. The anti-aircraft gun was derived from a 1897 field gun and could typically fire a 7.4 kg (16 lb) shrapnel shell at a rate of 20 rounds per minute. For anti-submarine warfare, the aviso was fitted with two depth charge throwers for twenty charges.

== Construction and career ==
Laid down by Chantiers de la Méditerranée at their shipyard in La Seyne-sur-Mer in 1918, Montmirail was launched on 12 September 1920. Montmirail was the first ship of the name in the French fleet, and after completing trials on 26 April 1922, the vessel departed Cherbourg to join a fleet of vessels in Syria. Due to the aviso's reliance on coal, rather than the more difficult to obtain fuel oil that powered many other ships of the class, Montmirail was deployed against the Red Sea slave trade. The role was given to the revived Escadre de Méditerranée (Mediterranean Squadron).

During the Rif War, the success of the Riffian force under Abd el-Krim led to Spain agreed with France on joint responsibility for the security of the coastline of their North African colonies. In particular, the countries were concerned about arms imports to the Riffian army. On 22 June, Montmirail joined sister ship Amiens in a blockade of the Moroccan coast, returning to Toulon on 10 December. The vessel was deployed to Oran the following year to patrol again, departing on 11 February. The ship continued to serve in this capacity until 13 August, when the force was stood down. During the blockade, the aviso was joined by a wide range of French and Spanish vessels, including sister ship Calais, and supported troops from Senegal as well as Morocco.

At the end of November 1931, Montmirail was retired from Mediterranean service and replaced by sister ship Dunkerque. On 29 October 1933 Montmirail was struck from the naval register as worn out from extensive service and, and on 25 April 1935 sold to be broken up.

== Bibliography ==
- Friedman, Norman (2011). Naval Weapons of World War One: Guns, Torpedoes, Mines and ASW Weapons of All Nations; An Illustrated Directory. Barnsley: Seaforth Publishing. ISBN 978-1-84832-100-7.
- Le Conte, Pierre (1932). Répertoire des Navires de Guerre Français [Directory of French Warships] (in French). Cherbourg: Pierre Le Conte, La Villarion, rue des Bastions. OCLC 1400324432.
- Labayle Couhat, Jean (1974). French Warships of World War I. Shepperton: Ian Allen. ISBN 978-0-71100-445-0.
- Smigielski, Adam (1985). "France". In Gardiner, Robert; Gray, Randal (eds.). Conway's All the World's Fighting Ships 1906–1921. London: Conway Maritime Press. ISBN 978-0-85177-245-5.
