= French aviso Arras =

Aviso of the French Navy

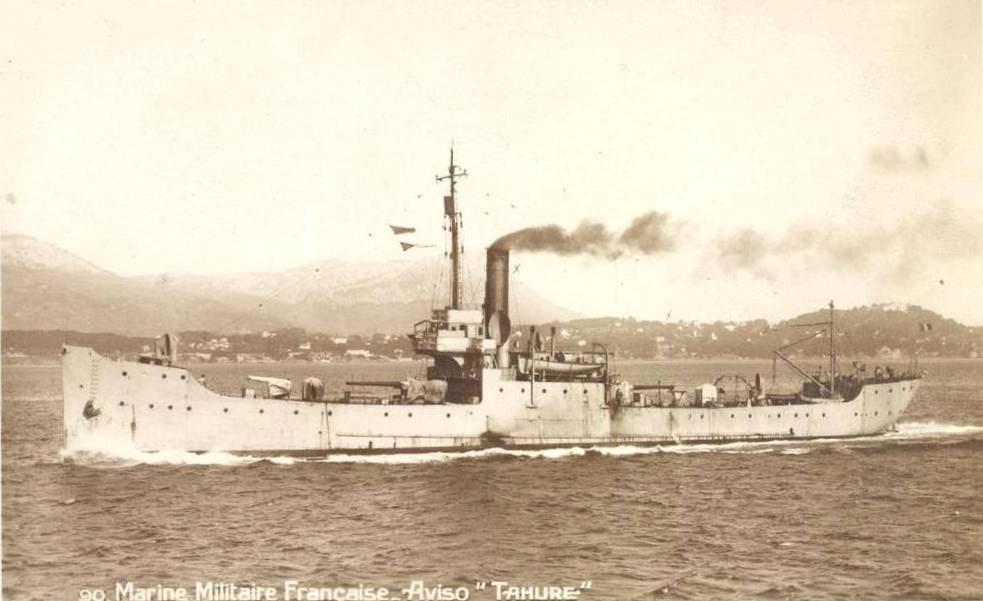
- Sister ship Tahure in 1939

History

France
- Name: Arras
- Builder: Arsenal de Brest, Brest
- Laid down: 1917
- Launched: July 1918
- Completed: 1918
- Out of service: February 1946
- Fate: Sold to be broken up

General characteristics (as built)
- Displacement: 850 long tons (864 t) standard
- Length: 74.9 m (245 ft 9 in) o/a
- Beam: 8.7 m (28 ft 7 in)
- Draught: 3.2 m (10 ft 6 in)
- Installed power: Guyot Du Temple boilers 3,000 shp (2,200 kW)
- Propulsion: Parsons steam turbines, 2 shafts
- Speed: 22 knots (25 mph; 41 km/h)
- Range: 3,000 nmi (5,600 km; 3,500 mi) at 11 knots (20 km/h; 13 mph)
- Complement: 103
- Armament: 2 × single 138 mm (5 in)/55 Modèle 1910; 1 × single 75 mm (3 in)/62.5 Modèle 1908; 4 × single 8 mm (0.31 in)/80 Modèle 1914 Hotchkiss; 2 × depth charge throwers

Arras was the lead ship of the Arras class, also known as the Amiens class, of avisos ordered by the French Navy at the end of the First World War. Designed as fast escorts, the ships had a primary armament of two 138.6-millimetre (5 in) guns and depth charges. Launched in 1918, the vessel served as a training ship, undertaking exercises with other warships of the French Navy including amphibious assaults. During the Second World War, Arras was detained by the British government and transferred to the Free French Naval Forces in 1940. Deployed as a depot ship and anti-aircraft ship in Portsmouth, in 1942, the vessel hosted the leader of Free France, Charles de Gaulle. At the end of the conflict, the vessel was retired and, in 1946, sold to be broken up.

== Design and development ==
Arras was the lead ship of the Arras class, a class of thirty fast avisos or sloops, designed to serves as escort ships, ordered under the 1916 and 1917 French Navy construction plans. Also known as the Amiens class, the ships were similar in layout to three-island merchant ships with a high bow, which meant that they sailed well in high seas, keeping their crew dry. They were considered roomy and comfortable ships, although the weight of their armament and superstructure meant that they rolled heavily.

The aviso had a length of 72 m (236 ft 2.6 in) between perpendiculars and 74.9 m (245 ft 8.8 in) overall, with a beam of 8.7 m (28 ft 6.5 in) and draught of 3.2 m (10 ft 6.0 in). Normal displacement was 850 long tons (860 t). Power was provided by two Guyot Du Temple water-tube boilers feeding two sets of Parsons geared steam turbines rated at5,000 shaft horsepower (3,700 kW), driving two shafts and exhausting through two funnels. Design speed was 20 knots (37 km/h; 23 mph) although the vessel could achieve 22 knots (41 km/h; 25 mph) under the right conditions. A total of 220 long tons (220 t) of oil was carried, which gave a design range of 3,000 nautical miles (5,600 km; 3,500 mi) at 11 knots (20 km/h; 13 mph). The ship had a complement of four officers and 99 other crew.

Arras had a main armament consisting of two single 138.6-millimetre (5 in) 55 calibre Modèle 1910 guns. Each could typically fire a 39.5-kilogram (87 lb) shell at a rate of five or six rounds per minute. They were mounted on the centreline, one forward and the other aft of the superstructure. A steel shield was added to the guns in 1928. A single 75 mm (3 in) 62.5 calibre anti-aircraft gun and four 8 mm (0.31 in) 80 calibre Modèle 1914 Hotchkiss machine guns were also carried. The anti-aircraft gun was derived from a 1897 field gun and could typically fire a 7.4-kilogram (16 lb) shrapnel shell at a rate of 20 rounds per minute. For anti-submarine warfare, the aviso was fitted with two throwers for twenty depth charges.

== Construction and career ==
Laid down by the Arsenal de Brest in the port of Brest, France in 1917, Arras was launched in July 1918 and completed in 1918. The first ship of the name in the French fleet, the vessel initially served as a training ship for ensigns. The vessel was sent to Rochefort to be repaired in 1923, returning to Brest on 27 September.

In 1924, the aviso joined a flotilla that included the French destroyer Téméraire to accompany the Northern Division of the French Fleet on exercises. They sailed on 29 January and returned the following month and the undertaking further exercises with the French submarine Bellone on 15 March. On 9 May, the vessel visited Bordeaux while on further exercises with French submarines. Arras then sailed to Quiberon Bay to undertake live firing trials between 26 and 29 May the following year. On 3 May 1927, the vessel took place in an amphibious assault training exercise near Brest. The ship was also used as a target to help train crews in the use of torpedoes. The vessel was subsequently refit in Cherbourg, re-entering service and returning to Brest on 21 March 1932. The warship then joined sister ship Coucy and other vessels in amphibious assault training alongside the 137th Infantry Regiment of the French Army and the Fusiliers marins on 25 April.

During the Second World War, Arras was sent to Britain and docked at Portsmouth. On 9 September 1940, the ship was one of a number of French vessels, including the submarine Surcouf, that were seized by the British transferred to the Free French Naval Forces. On 15 December, the vessel was employed as a depot ship. While based in Portsmouth, the aviso was rearmed with greater anti-aircraft armament and provided additional defence for the city and shipyard against German bombers. Alongside sister ships Amiens and Épinal, Arras hosted the leader of Free France, Charles de Gaulle, on 25 October 1942. The vessel was subsequently cannibalised to provide spare parts for Amiens. At the end of the conflict, Arras was retired, sold in February 1946 and subsequently broken up.

== Bibliography ==
- Bertrand, Michel (1982). La marine française au combat, 1939-1945: Des combats de l'Atlantique aux F.N.F.L. [The French Navy in Combat, 1939-1945: From the Atlantic Battles to the F.N.F.L.] (in French). Paris: Charles-Lavauzelle. ISBN 978-2-70250-002-6.
- Friedman, Norman (2011). Naval Weapons of World War One: Guns, Torpedoes, Mines and ASW Weapons of All Nations; An Illustrated Directory. Barnsley: Seaforth Publishing. ISBN 978-1-84832-100-7.
- Le Conte, Pierre (1932). Répertoire des Navires de Guerre Français [Directory of French Warships] (in French). Cherbourg: Pierre Le Conte, La Villarion, rue des Bastions. OCLC 1400324432.
- Labayle Couhat, Jean (1974). French Warships of World War I. Shepperton: Ian Allen. ISBN 978-0-71100-445-0.
- Smigielski, Adam (1985). "France". In Gardiner, Robert; Gray, Randal (eds.). Conway's All the World's Fighting Ships 1906–1921. London: Conway Maritime Press. ISBN 978-0-85177-245-5.
