= French aviso Amiens =

Aviso of the French Navy

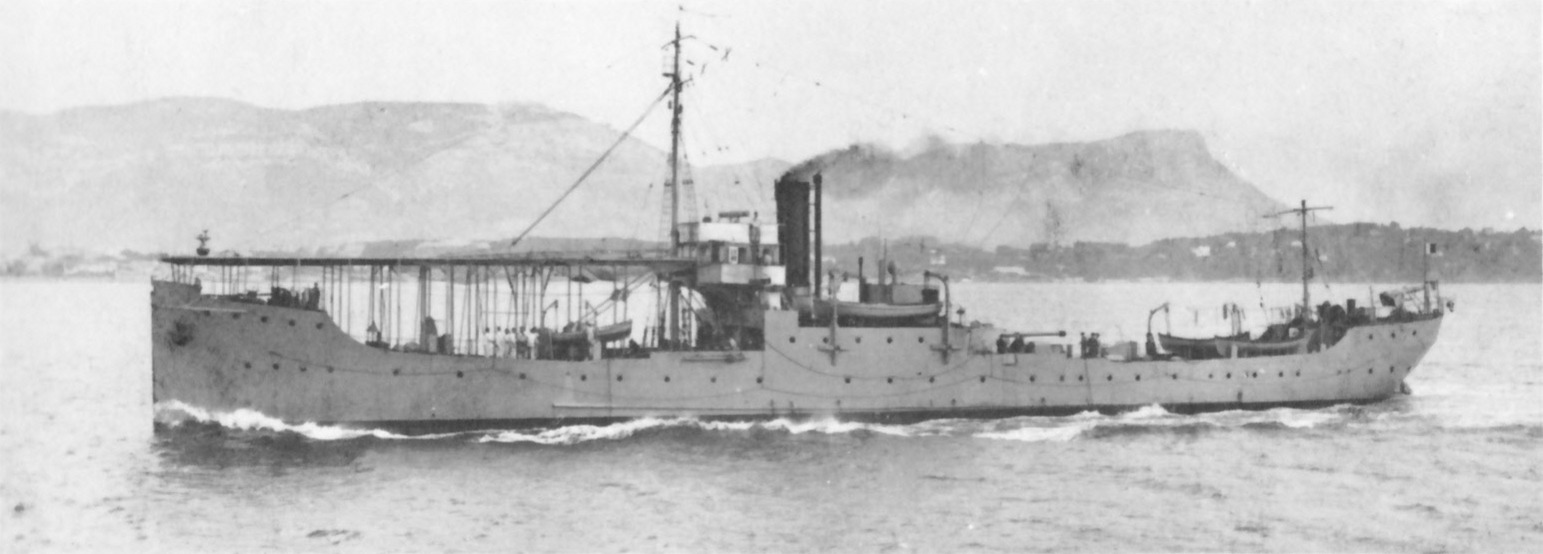
- Sister ship Bapaume in 1920

History

France
- Name: Amiens
- Builder: Ch de la Méditerranée, La Seyne-sur-Mer
- Laid down: 1918
- Launched: May 1919
- Completed: 1920
- Out of service: October 1949
- Fate: Sold to be broken up

General characteristics (as built)
- Displacement: 850 long tons (864 t) standard
- Length: 74.9 m (245 ft 9 in) o/a
- Beam: 8.7 m (28 ft 7 in)
- Draught: 3.2 m (10 ft 6 in)
- Installed power: Normand boilers 3,000 shp (2,200 kW)
- Propulsion: Parsons steam turbines, 2 shafts
- Speed: 22 knots (25 mph; 41 km/h)
- Range: 3,000 nmi (5,600 km; 3,500 mi) at 11 knots (20 km/h; 13 mph)
- Complement: 103
- Armament: 2 × single 138 mm (5.4 in)/55 Modèle 1910; 1 × single 75 mm (3 in)/62.5 Modèle 1908; 4 × single 8 mm (0.31 in)/80 Modèle 1914 Hotchkiss; 2 × depth charge throwers

Amiens was the lead ship of the Amiens class, also known as the Arras class, of avisos ordered by the French Navy at the end of the First World War. Designed as fast escorts, the ships had a primary armament of two 138.6-millimetre (5 in) guns and depth charges. Launched in 1919, the vessel served in the Rif War in 1925, enforcing a blockade on the Riffian forces under Abd el-Krim that were fighting France and Spain. During the Second World War, Amiens was fitted with an experimental twin 37-millimetre (1.5 in) anti-aircraft gun developed for an unbuilt battleship. Subsequently sailing to Portsmouth, the ship was detained by the British government and transferred to the Free French Naval Forces in 1940. Amiens served as a depot ship. At the end of the conflict, the vessel was retired and, in 1949, sold to be broken up.

== Design and development ==
Amiens was the lead ship of the Amiens class, a class of thirty fast avisos or sloops, designed to serves as escort ships, ordered under the 1916 and 1917 French Navy construction plans. Also known as the Arras class, the ships were similar in layout to three-island merchant ships with a high bow, which meant that they sailed well in high seas, keeping their crew dry. They were considered roomy and comfortable ships, although the weight of their armament and superstructure meant that they rolled heavily.

The aviso had a length of 72 m (236 ft 2.6 in) between perpendiculars and 74.9 m (245 ft 8.8 in) overall, with a beam of 8.7 m (28 ft 6.5 in) and draught of 3.2 m (10 ft 6.0 in). Normal displacement was 850 long tons (860 t). Power was provided by two Normand water-tube boilers feeding two sets of Parsons geared steam turbines rated at5,000 shaft horsepower (3,700 kW), driving two shafts and exhausting through two funnels. Design speed was 20 knots (37 km/h; 23 mph) although the vessel could achieve 22 knots (41 km/h; 25 mph) under the right conditions. A total of 200 long tons (200 t) of oil was carried, which gave a design range of 3,000 nautical miles (5,600 km; 3,500 mi) at 11 knots (20 km/h; 13 mph). The ship had a complement of four officers and 99 other crew.

Amiens had a main armament consisting of two single 138.6-millimetre (5.5 in) 55 calibre Modèle 1910 guns. Each could typically fire a 39.5-kilogram (87 lb) shell at a rate of five or six rounds per minute. They were mounted on the centreline, one forward and the other aft of the superstructure. A steel shield was added to the guns in 1928. A single 75 mm (3 in) 62.5 calibre anti-aircraft gun and four 8 mm (0.31 in) 80 calibre Modèle 1914 Hotchkiss machine guns were also carried. The anti-aircraft gun was derived from a 1897 field gun and could typically fire a 7.4-kilogram (16 lb) shrapnel shell at a rate of 20 rounds per minute. For anti-submarine warfare, the aviso was fitted with two throwers for twenty depth charges. At Dunkirk in 1940, the ship was fitted with a 37-millimetre (1.5 in) anti-aircraft gun on an experimental Mk 33 twin mounting that had been planned for Gascogne, the cancelled fourth Richelieu-class battleship.

== Construction and career ==
Laid down by Ch de la Méditerranée at their yard La Seyne-sur-Mer in 1918, Amiens was launched in May 1919 and completed in 1920. The vessel completed full power tests on 3 July 1920, Amiens was the first of the name in the French fleet.

During a strike caused by a dispute over the regulations for French shipping in the Mediterranean Sea, the vessel was called upon to carry mail between Marseille and Algeria on 25 September 1922. During the Rif War, the success of the Riffian force under Abd el-Krim led to Spain agreeing with France on 22 June 1925 on joint responsibility for the security of the coastline of their north African colonies. In particular, the countries were concerned about arms imports to the Riffian army. On 29 July, Amiens arrived in Tangier along with the Spanish gunboat Laya and initiated a blockade of the coast. The vessel served in the role until 26 September, returning to Toulon for minor repairs.

On 20 March 1939, the ship was transferred to Port-Vendres. During the Second World War, Amiens was sent to Britain joining the destroyer Ouragan, two armed trawlers and three submarines that were docked at Portsmouth. On 3 July 1940, the ships were seized by the British and the vessel was transferred to the Free French Naval Forces, serving as a depot ship. Alongside sister ships Arras and Épinal, Amiens hosted the leader of Free France, Charles de Gaulle, on 25 October 1942. At the end of the conflict, Amiens was retired, sold on 13 October 1949 and subsequently broken up.

== Bibliography ==
- Friedman, Norman (2011). Naval Weapons of World War One: Guns, Torpedoes, Mines and ASW Weapons of All Nations; An Illustrated Directory. Barnsley: Seaforth Publishing. ISBN 978-1-84832-100-7.
- Le Conte, Pierre (1932). Répertoire des Navires de Guerre Français [Directory of French Warships] (in French). Cherbourg: Pierre Le Conte, La Villarion, rue des Bastions. OCLC 1400324432.
- Labayle Couhat, Jean (1974). French Warships of World War I. Shepperton: Ian Allen. ISBN 978-0-71100-445-0.
- Noli, Jean (1972). Le Choix: Souffrance et Gloire de la Marine Française Pendant la Seconde Guerre Mondiale [The Choice: Suffering and Glory of the French Navy during World War II] (in French). Paris: Fayad. OCLC 1121690554.
- Smigielski, Adam (1985). "France". In Gardiner, Robert; Gray, Randal (eds.). Conway's All the World's Fighting Ships 1906–1921. London: Conway Maritime Press. ISBN 978-0-85177-245-5.
