= French aviso Coucy =

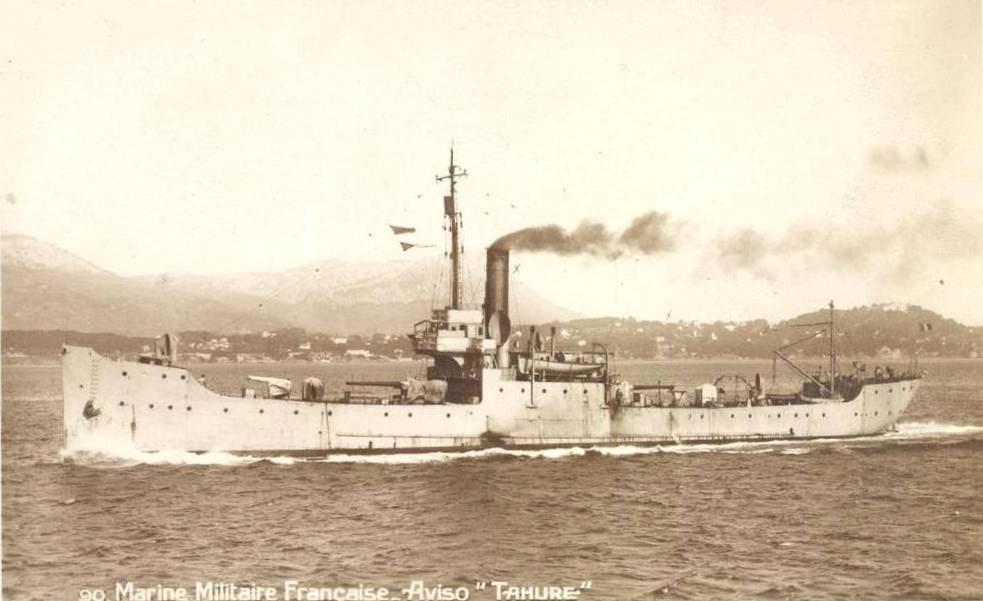
- Sister ship Tahure in 1939

History

France
- Name: Coucy
- Builder: Ateliers et Chantiers de Saint-Nazaire Penhoët, Saint-Nazaire
- Laid down: 1918
- Launched: 1919
- Commissioned: 1920
- Out of service: 1946
- Fate: Sold to be broken up

General characteristics (as built)
- Displacement: 850 long tons (864 t) standard
- Length: 75 m (246 ft 1 in) o/a
- Beam: 8.7 m (28 ft 7 in)
- Draught: 3.2 m (10 ft 6 in)
- Installed power: Guyot du Temple boilers 3,000 shp (2,200 kW)
- Propulsion: Parsons steam turbines, 2 shafts
- Speed: 22 knots (25 mph; 41 km/h)
- Range: 3,000 nmi (5,600 km; 3,500 mi) at 11 knots (20 km/h; 13 mph)
- Complement: 103
- Armament: 2 × single 138 mm (5.4 in)/55 Modèle 1910; 1 × single 75 mm (3 in)/62.5 Modèle 1908; 4 × single 8 mm (0.31 in)/80 Modèle 1914 Hotchkiss; 2 × depth charge throwers

Coucy was an aviso of the Arras class, also known as the Amiens class, that served in the Second World War. Ordered by the French Navy at the end of the First World War, the ships were designed as fast escort with a primary armament of two 138.6-millimetre (5 in) guns and depth charges. Launched in 1919, Coucy was deployed to Saint Pierre and Miquelon in 1920 to operate off the coast of Canada and Newfoundland. The vessel subsequently served as a training ship with the École navale (Naval School) during the 1930s, training engineers and midshipmen for the French Navy. During the Second World War, the aviso was towed to Plymouth and served with the Free French Naval Forces. In 1946, Coucy was sold and broken up.

== Design and development ==
Coucy was a member of the Arras or Amiens class, a class of thirty fast avisos or sloops, designed to serve as escort ships and ordered under the 1916 and 1917 French Navy construction plans. The ships were similar in layout to three-island merchant ships with a high bow, which meant that they sailed well in high seas, keeping their crew dry. They were considered roomy and comfortable ships, although the weight of their armament and superstructure meant that they rolled heavily.

The aviso had a length of 72 m (236 ft 2.6 in) between perpendiculars and 74.9 m (245 ft 8.8 in) overall, with a beam of 8.7 m (28 ft 6.5 in) and draught of 3.2 m (10 ft 6.0 in). Normal displacement was 850 long tons (860 t). Power was provided by two Guyot du Temple water-tube boilers feeding two sets of Parsons geared steam turbines rated at 5,000 shaft horsepower (3,700 kW). These drove two shafts and exhausted through two funnels. Design speed was 22 knots (41 km/h; 25 mph), and a total of 200 long tons (200 t) of fuel oil was carried, which gave a design range of 3,000 nautical miles (5,600 km; 3,500 mi) at 11 knots (20 km/h; 13 mph). The ship had a complement of four officers and 99 other crew.

Coucy had a main armament consisting of two single 138.6-millimetre (5 in) 55 calibre Modèle 1910 guns. Each could typically fire a 39.5-kilogram (87 lb) shell at a rate of five or six rounds per minute. They were mounted on the centreline, one forward and the other aft of the superstructure. A single 75 mm (3 in) 62.5 calibre anti-aircraft gun and four 8 mm (0.31 in) 80 calibre Modèle 1914 Hotchkiss machine guns were also carried. The anti-aircraft gun was derived from a 1897 field gun and could typically fire a 7.4-kilogram (16 lb) shrapnel shell at a rate of 20 rounds per minute. For anti-submarine warfare, the aviso was fitted with two throwers for twenty depth charges.

== Construction and career ==
Laid down by Ateliers et Chantiers de Saint-Nazaire Penhoët at their shipyard in Saint-Nazaire in 1918, Coucy was launched in June 1919 and completed in 1920. The first ship of the name in the French fleet, the vessel left Brest on 21 June to travel to Newfoundland and Canada, stationed at Saint Pierre and Miquelon. On 5 February 1921, the warship accompanied the cruisers Gueydon and Marseillaise on a voyage back to Brest.

On 9 July 1930, the vessel was part of the École navale (Naval School) focused on training midshipmen. On 14 March 1932, quartermaster Marc Jacquelet fell from a buoy to which the vessel was mooring. He died shortly afterwards in hospital. On 8 September, the vessel joined other members of the training flotilla visiting Antwerp. After a refit, the ship was transferred within the school to train engineers from 28 December 1936.

As France prepared for the Second World War, Coucy was, along with sister ship Épinal, was based at Brest. After the Battle of France, the vessel was towed to Plymouth after running aground and was transferred by the British to the Free French Naval Forces. The aviso served as a depot ship. After the war, in 1946, Coucy was sold to be broken up.

== Bibliography ==
- Bertrand, Michel (1982). La marine française au combat, 1939-1945: Des combats de l'Atlantique aux F.N.F.L. [The French Navy in Combat, 1939-1945: From the Atlantic Battles to the F.N.F.L.] (in French). Paris: Charles-Lavauzelle. ISBN 978-2-70250-002-6.
- Friedman, Norman (2011). Naval Weapons of World War One: Guns, Torpedoes, Mines and ASW Weapons of All Nations; An Illustrated Directory. Barnsley: Seaforth Publishing. ISBN 978-1-84832-100-7.
- Le Conte, Pierre (1932). Répertoire des Navires de Guerre Français [Directory of French Warships] (in French). Cherbourg: Pierre Le Conte, La Villarion, rue des Bastions. OCLC 1400324432.
- Labayle Couhat, Jean (1974). French Warships of World War I. Shepperton: Ian Allen. ISBN 978-0-71100-445-0.
- Labayle Couhat, Jean (1971). French Warships of World War II. Shepperton: Ian Allen. ISBN 978-0-71100-153-4.
- Smigielski, Adam (1985). "France". In Gardiner, Robert; Gray, Randal (eds.). Conway's All the World's Fighting Ships 1906–1921. London: Conway Maritime Press. ISBN 978-0-85177-245-5.
