= Arras-class aviso =

Series of French Navy boats

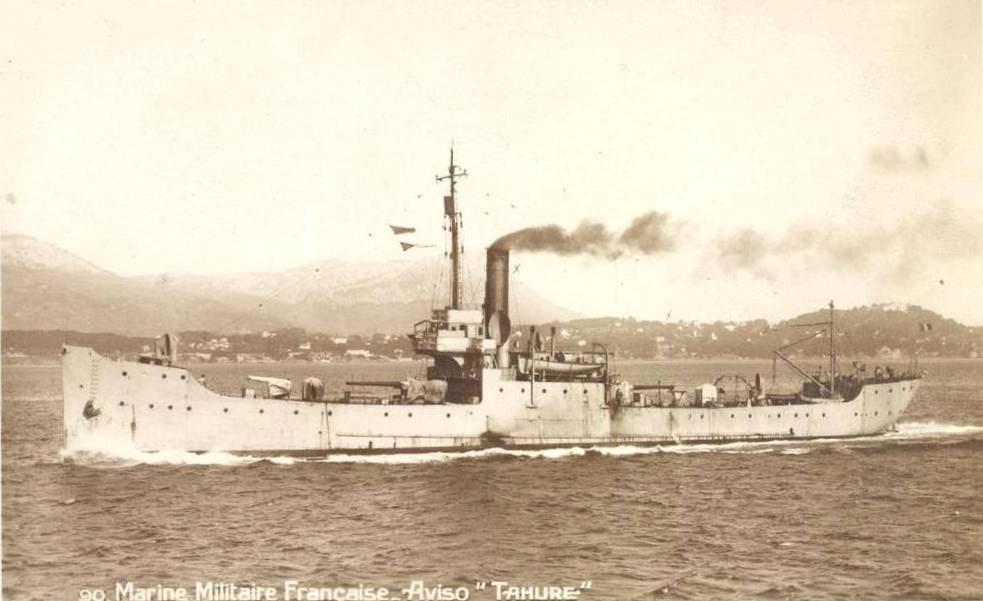
- The aviso Tahure in 1939.

Class overview
- Name: Arras class
- Operators: French Navy; Free French Naval Forces; Kriegsmarine
- Preceded by: Marne class
- Succeeded by: Ailette class
- Subclasses: Craonne class (coal burning)
- Built: 1917–1922
- Planned: 43
- Completed: 30
- Canceled: 13
- Lost: 4

General characteristics
- Type: Aviso
- Displacement: 850 long tons (864 t) standard
- Length: 75 m (246 ft 1 in) o/a
- Beam: 8.7 m (28 ft 7 in)
- Draught: 3.2 m (10 ft 6 in)
- Propulsion: 2 shafts, 2 Parsons steam turbines engines, 2 oil or coal-fired du Temple boilers or Normand boilers; 5,000 bhp (3,700 kW)
- Speed: 19–22 knots (22–25 mph; 35–41 km/h)
- Range: 3,000 nmi (5,600 km; 3,500 mi) at 11 knots (20 km/h; 13 mph)
- Complement: 4 officers, 99 sailors
- Armament: 2 × 138 mm (5 in)/55 Modèle 1910 (2 × 1); 1 × 75 mm (3 in)/62.5 Modèle 1908 (1 × 1); 4 × 8 mm (0.31 in)/80 Modèle 1914 Hotchkiss (4 × 1); 2 × ADW Mortars; 2 × Naval mine rails

The Arras class, sometimes known as the Amiens class, were a series of aviso (also referred to as sloops) built for the French Navy at the end of World War I.

== Design and development ==
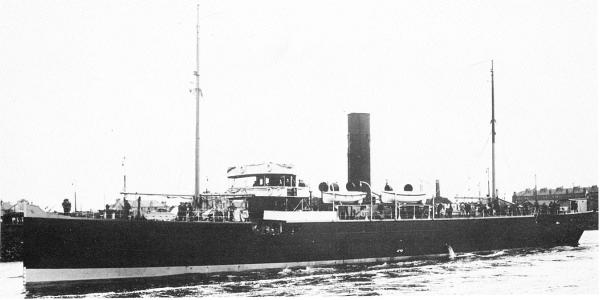
British First World War Q-ship HMS Tamarisk

A total of forty three fast "first-rate" avisos for convoy escort duties. These ships were ordered under 1916 and 1917 building programmes for the French Navy and all were named after places on the Western Front lines. Built in nine different military and civilian dockyards across France, The first of which, Arras, entered commission May 1918. The signing of the Armistice of 11 November 1918 marked the end of the First World War, and the final thirteen planned Arras-class ships were cancelled. The remaining ships were slowly completed from 1919 to 1924.

The ships were modelled after the success of British Q-ships, military ships purposely designed to resemble three-island type merchant cargo ships to deceive enemy U-boats. As such, like merchant ships they were considered roomy for their size and remained dry in head seas.

The Arras class had a length between perpendiculars of 72 metres (236 ft 3 in) and an overall length of 75 metres (246 ft 1 in) with a width of 8.7 metres (28 ft 7 in) and a draught of 3.2 m (10 ft 6 in). At normal displacement the ships were 860 tonnes (850 long tons). The majority of the ships were powered by oil-fired twin-shaft Parsons steam turbine engines and carried 200 tonnes (200 long tons) of fuel oil. The exceptions were Craonne, Liévin, Montmirail, Mondement, Baccarat and Bethune which were coal-fired and carried 188 tonnes (185 long tons) of coal and had two du Temple boilers or Normand boilers. The range of Arras-class ships was 3,000 nautical miles (5,600 km; 3,500 mi) at 11 knots (20 km/h; 13 mph). Oil-fired ships were faster, and capable of reaching 22 knots (41 km/h; 25 mph) while coal-fired ships were slower.

The Arras class were armed with two single 138 mm (5 in)/55 Modèle 1910 guns in unshielded mounts with wide broadside arcs, located fore and aft of the amidships island where they could be disguised as cargo-handling booms until brought into action against a submarine (the submarine's easiest attack angle would place it naturally on broadside to the aviso, obviating the need for heavy bow fire). Secondary armament consisted of a single 75 mm (3 in)/62.5 Modèle 1908 gun on a central high-angled mount as anti-aircraft artillery. Initially armed with four single 8 mm (0.31 in)/80 Modèle 1914 machine guns, these were later replaced with four single 13.2 mm/76 Modèle 1929 machine guns. Some ships were briefly armed with two single 145 mm (6 in)/48.5 Modèle 1916 Army-pattern guns.

== Service history ==
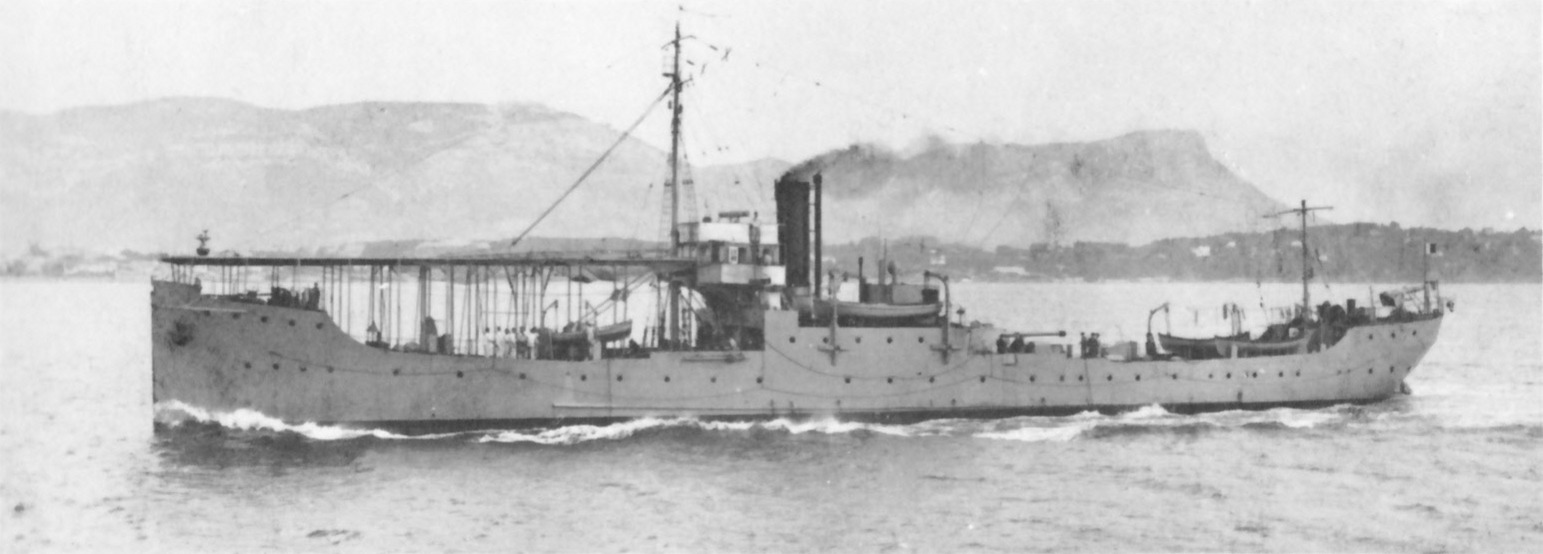
The French aviso Bapaume was fitted with a 20 m (66 ft) hangar deck and used for flying-off tests

Ships completed before the end of the war participated in the trans-Atlantic convoys. In the Interwar period the avisos Belfort, Épernay, Lunéville, Péronne, Revigny in November 1927 and Reims in 1928, were loaned to the Compagnie générale aéropostale. While in Compagnie générale aéropostale service Épernay caught fire and was destroyed off of Natal in 1930. The surviving ships were returned to French naval service in 1931. Bar-le-Duc foundered and was stricken off of Lesbos while escorting Wrangel's fleet during the Allied intervention in the Russian Civil War in 1920. Other ships were reassigned to a variety of duties. Les Éparges and Ypres were disarmed and converted to survey vessels. Vauquois and Remiremont were used as training ships. Bapaume was temporarily given a flight deck from bow to bridge for takeoff training for French Naval Aviation under a plan devised by naval aviation pioneer Paul Teste between 1920 and 1924. Belfort was converted to a seaplane tender.

At the start of the Second World War in 1939, nineteen Arras-class avisos had been retired and only eleven still remained in active service. Several ships of the class were active in the evacuation of Allied Forces after the collapse of France in June 1940. One of which, Vauquois was sunk by a naval mine on 18 June 1940. After the Armistice of 22 June 1940 was signed between Nazi Germany and the French Third Republic, the French Navy became split in two. French Navy ships in British ports were interned and soon passed to the fledgling Free French Naval Forces. These were Amiens, Arras, Belfort, Coucy, and Epinal. Those ships still in France and her colonial empire swore allegiance to the new collaborationist Vichy French government of Philippe Pétain. Calais participated in the defence of Dakar in September 1940. Tahure, which was stationed in Vichy-controlled French Indochina during the French-Thai war and participated in the Battle of Koh Chang on 17 January 1941. Tahure was sunk by USS Flasher (the United States having declared war on the Vichy French government with Operation Torch) on 29 April 1944. While in Vichy French service, Lassigny was retired in 1941 and Ypres (formerly Dunkerque) was retired April 1942. Les Éparges was scuttled at Toulon on 27 November 1942 but was raised by Germany and converted to a minesweeper. She was renamed M 6060 and commissioned into the Kriegsmarine on 5 May 1943. She was in the process of being converted to an escort shipped and renamed SG25 when she caught fire and work on her was abandoned on 1 March 1944.

After the war the surviving ships of the class were returned to France and broken up, the last remaining Arras-class ship, Amiens was scrapped 13 October 1949.

== Ships ==
Cancelled ships were Betheny, Chalons, Château-Thierry, Compiègne, Douaumont, Fère-Champenoise, Gerbeviller, Noyon, Roye, Saint-Dié, Senlis, Soissons and Souchez.

Name	Builder	Laid down	Launched	Notes	Fate
Amiens	Forges et Chantiers de la Méditerranée (FCM), La Seyne-sur-Mer	1918	May 1919	Armed with experimental twin-mounted Canon de 37 mm Modèle 1935 in 1940. Seized by the British 3 July 1940 in Portsmouth as part of Operation Catapult. Transferred to the Free French Naval Forces (FNFL).	Sold for breaking up 13 October 1949.
Arras	Arsenal de Brest, Brest	1917	July 1917	Seized by the British 3 July 1940 in Portsmouth as part of Operation Catapult. Transferred to the FNFL and used as a Barracks ship. Cannibalised for parts for Amiens.	Sold for breaking up February 1946.
Baccarat	Chantiers et Ateliers de Provence (CAP), Port-de-Bouc	1919	January 1918		Sold for breaking up 1933.
Bapaume	Arsenal de Lorient, Lorient	1917	August 1918	Flight deck temporarily added (from bow to bridge) July 1920.	Sold for breaking up 1937.
Bar-le-Duc	Arsenal de Lorient, Lorient	1917	1918	Stranded near Lesbos while escorting Wrangel's fleet to Bizerte during the Allied intervention in the Russian Civil War.	Sunk 13 December 1920.
Belfort	Arsenal de Lorient, Lorient	1918	March 1919	Leased to the Compagnie générale aéropostale from 1927 to 1931. Converted to a seaplane tender in 1935. Participated in the evacuation of British forces at Dunkerque 29 May 1940. Seized by British forces at Portsmouth 3 July 1940. Transferred to the FNFL and used as a Barracks ship.	Sold for breaking up 22 November 1946.
Béthune	Chantiers et Ateliers de Provence (CAP), Port-de-Bouc	1920	July 1921		Sold for breaking up 1934.
Calais	Forges et Chantiers de la Méditerranée (FCM), La Seyne-sur-Mer	1918	November 1919	Passed to Vichy France 10 July 1940, participated in the Battle of Dakar.	Sold for breaking up 26 November 1946.
Coucy	Ateliers et Chantiers de Saint-Nazaire Penhoët, Saint-Nazaire	1918	June 1919	Seized by the British 3 July 1940 in Portsmouth as part of Operation Catapult.	Sold for breaking up 26 February 1946.
Craonne	Forges et Chantiers de la Méditerranée (FCM), La Seyne-sur-Mer	1917	January 1920		Sold for breaking up 1935.
Dunkerque	Arsenal de Brest, Brest	1917	July 1918	Renamed Ypres 1928. Converted to survey vessel and disarmed. Passed to Vichy France 10 July 1940.	Sold for breaking up April 1942.
Épernay	Forges et Chantiers de la Méditerranée (FCM), La Seyne-sur-Mer	1918	September 1919	Leased to the Compagnie générale aéropostale from 1927 to 1930. 8 August 1930, destroyed by fire in Natal, Brazil.	Sold for breaking up 1934.
Épinal	Ateliers et Chantiers de Saint-Nazaire Penhoët, Saint-Nazaire	1918	August 1919	Two 138 mm Modèle 1910 guns replaced by two 145 mm (6 in)/45 Modèle 1910 army guns. Participated in the evacuation of British forces at Dunkerque 29 May 1940. Seized by British forces at Portsmouth 3 July 1940. Transferred to the FNFL.	Sold for breaking up December 1946.
Lassigny	Ateliers et Chantiers de Bretagne (ACB), Nantes	1918	July 1919	Passed to Vichy France 10 July 1940.	Sold for breaking up in French Morocco 31 October 1941. Hulked in Bizerte, French Tunisia. Scuttled by retreating Royal Italian Army forces July 1943 during the Tunisian Campaign.
Les Éparges	Ateliers et Chantiers de Bretagne (ACB), Nantes	1918	September 1919	Disarmed in the 1920s and converted to a survey vessel. Passed to Vichy France 10 July 1940. Scuttled 27 November 1942 to prevent seizure by Nazi Germany during Operation Anton. Refloated by the Germans in December 1942 and converted to a minesweeper. Renamed M6060 and recommissioned 5 May 1943. Work on conversion to a Schnelles Geleitboot (Fast escort ship) was started and the ship was renamed SG25. Damaged by fire 1 March 1944 and never completed.	Scuttled
Liévin	Forges et Chantiers de la Méditerranée (FCM), La Seyne-sur-Mer	1917	March 1920		Sold for breaking up 1935.
Lunéville	Forges et Chantiers de la Méditerranée (FCM), La Seyne-sur-Mer	1917	January 1920	Leased to the Compagnie générale aéropostale from 1927 to 1931.	Sold for breaking up 1935.
Montdement	Forges et Chantiers de la Méditerranée (FCM), La Seyne-sur-Mer	1918	January 1920		Sold for breaking up 1935.
Montmirail	Forges et Chantiers de la Méditerranée (FCM), La Seyne-sur-Mer	1918	September 1920		Sold for breaking up 1933.
Nancy	Arsenal de Cherbourg, Cherbourg	1917	March 1919		Sold for breaking up 1938.
Péronne	Forges et Chantiers de la Méditerranée (FCM), Le Havre	1917	March 1920	Leased to the Compagnie générale aéropostale from 1927 to 1931.	Sold for breaking up 1935.
Reims	Arsenal de Brest, Brest	1917	July 1918	Leased to the Compagnie générale aéropostale from 1928 to 1931.	Sold for breaking up 1938.
Remiremont	Forges et Chantiers de la Gironde (FCG), Bordeaux	1917	July 1920	Converted to a training ship in 1925.	Sold for breaking up 1936.
Révigny	Forges et Chantiers de la Gironde (FCG), Bordeaux	1917	September 1920	Leased to the Compagnie générale aéropostale from 1927 to 1931.	Sold for breaking up 1937.
Tahure	Ateliers et Chantiers de la Loire (ACL), Saint-Nazaire	1918	March 1918	Passed to Vichy France 10 July 1940, participated in the Battle of Koh Chang.	Sunk 24 September 1944 by USS Flasher (SS-249).
Toul	Ateliers et Chantiers de la Loire (ACL), Saint-Nazaire	1917	April 1919		Sold for breaking up 1935.
Vauquois	Ateliers et Chantiers de la Loire (ACL), Saint-Nazaire	1918	August 1919	Converted to a training ship in 1925. Participated in the evacuation of British forces at Brest, 18 June 1940.	Sunk by Luftwaffe naval mine 18 June 1940 during Operation Aerial.
Verdun	Ateliers et Chantiers de la Loire (ACL), Saint-Nazaire	1917	November 1918	Renamed Laffaux in 1928.	Sold for breaking up 1938.
Vimy	Ateliers et Chantiers de la Loire (ACL), Saint-Nazaire	1918	December 1919		Sold for breaking up 1935.
Vitry-le-François	Ateliers et Chantiers de la Loire (ACL), Saint-Nazaire	1918	March 1920		Sold for breaking up 1935.

== See also ==
- Q-ship
- Merchant raider
