= French aviso Les Éparges =

Aviso of the French Navy

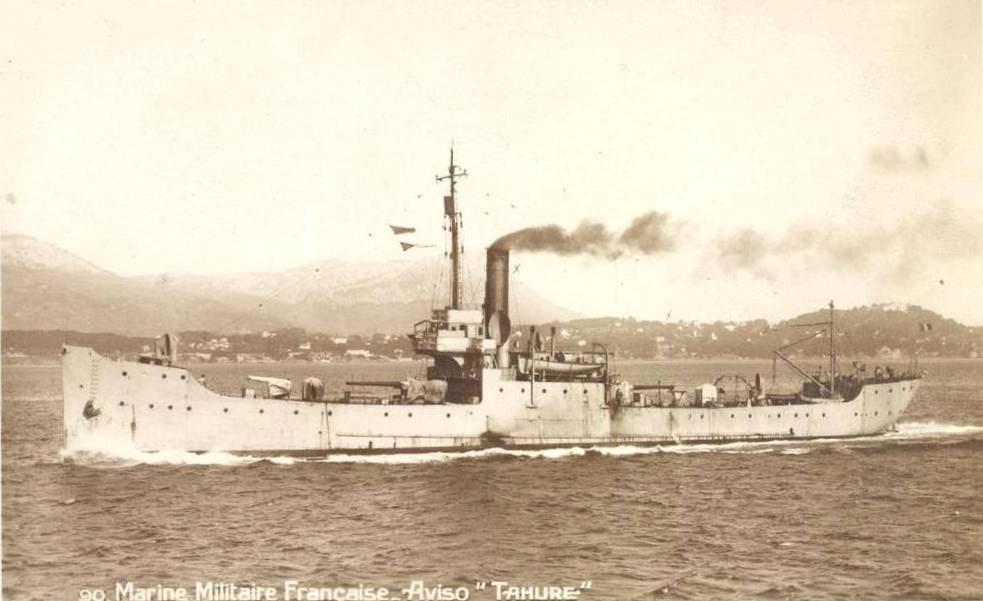
- Sister ship Tahura in 1939

History

France
- Name: Les Éparges
- Namesake: Battle of Les Éparges
- Builder: Ateliers et Chantiers de Bretagne, Nantes
- Laid down: 1918
- Launched: September 1919
- Fate: Scuttled following a fire on 1 March 1944

General characteristics (as built)
- Displacement: 850 long tons (864 t) standard
- Length: 74.9 m (245 ft 9 in) o/a
- Beam: 8.7 m (28 ft 7 in)
- Draught: 3.2 m (10 ft 6 in)
- Installed power: Guyot du Temple boilers 3,000 shp (2,200 kW)
- Propulsion: Parsons steam turbines, 2 shafts
- Speed: 20 knots (23 mph; 37 km/h)
- Range: 3,000 nmi (5,600 km; 3,500 mi) at 11 knots (20 km/h; 13 mph)
- Complement: 103
- Armament: 2 × single 138.6 mm (5 in)/55 Modèle 1910; 1 × single 75 mm (3 in)/62.5 Modèle 1908; 4 × single 8 mm (0.31 in)/80 Modèle 1914 Hotchkiss; 2 × depth charge throwers

Les Éparges was an aviso of the Arras class, also known as the Amiens class, that served with the French Navy and German Kriegsmarine during the Second World War. Designed as fast escorts at the end of the First World War, the ships had a primary armament of two 138.6-millimetre (5 in) guns and depth charges. Launched in 1919 the vessel initially served as a guard ship in Toulon, experiencing suspected sabotage in 1921, although the sailor charged with the offence was pardoned in 1922. In 1926, the vessel served with the Commission d’études pratiques de navigation (Commission for Practical Navigation Studies) in Toulon as part of a French programme to study compasses and gyroscopes before being transferred in 1929 to the better equipped Commission de détection littorale de Cherbourg (Cherbourg Coastal Detection Commission). Disarmed, at the start of the Second World War, the ship was transferred to the Marine de Vichy (Vichy French Navy) and scuttled at Toulon in 1942. Subsequently raised, the vessel entered service with the Kriegsmarine as the minesweeper M.6060 and then the corvette SG.25. After a fire in 1944, the ship was scuttled but this time was not raised.

== Design and development ==
Les Éparges was a member of the Arras or Amiens class, a class of thirty fast avisos or sloops, designed to serve as escort ships and ordered under the 1916 and 1917 French Navy construction plans. The ships were similar in layout to three-island merchant ships with a high bow, which meant that they sailed well in high seas, keeping their crew dry. They were considered roomy and comfortable ships, although the weight of their armament and superstructure meant that they rolled heavily.

The aviso had a length of 72 m (236 ft 2.6 in) between perpendiculars and 74.9 m (245 ft 8.8 in) overall, with a beam of 8.7 m (28 ft 6.5 in) and draught of 3.2 m (10 ft 6.0 in). Normal displacement was 850 long tons (860 t). Power was provided by two Guyot Du Temple water-tube boilers feeding two sets of Parsons geared steam turbines rated at 5,000 shaft horsepower (3,700 kW), driving two shafts and exhausting through two funnels. Design speed was 20 knots (37 km/h; 23 mph) although the vessel achieved 22 knots (41 km/h; 25 mph) under trials. A total of 220 long tons (220 t) of oil was carried, which gave a design range of 3,000 nautical miles (5,600 km; 3,500 mi) at 11 knots (20 km/h; 13 mph). The ship had a complement of four officers and 99 other crew.

Les Éparges had a main armament consisting of two single 138.6-millimetre (5 in) 55 calibre Modèle 1910 guns. Each could typically fire a 39.5-kilogram (87 lb) shell at a rate of five or six rounds per minute. They were mounted on the centreline, one forward and the other aft of the superstructure. A single 75 mm (3 in) 62.5 calibre anti-aircraft gun and four 8 mm (0.31 in) 80 calibre Modèle 1914 Hotchkiss machine guns were also carried. The anti-aircraft gun was derived from a 1897 field gun and could typically fire a 7.4-kilogram (16 lb) shrapnel shell at a rate of 20 rounds per minute. For anti-submarine warfare, the aviso was fitted with two throwers for twenty depth charges.

== Construction and career ==
Laid down by Chantiers de la Méditerranée at their shipyard in La Seyne-sur-Mer in 1917, Les Éparges was launched in September 1919. The first ship of the name in the French fleet, after completing trials, on 5 July 1921, the vessel was deployed to the fleet as a guard ship at Toulon. On 28 November, quartermaster Pierre Farge was charged with sabotage after damage had been found on the ship that was deemed deliberate. Protesting his innocence, he was imprisoned until 10 January the following year, when he was released and subsequently given a pardon by the Minister of the Navy Flaminius Raiberti. He returned to the ship, which by that point had been transferred to Toulon. In between, on 28 November, the vessel had left Lorient and sailed for Gibraltar for a brief deployment in the Mediterranean Sea.

In 1926, the French Navy set up a Commission d’études pratiques de navigation Commission for Practical Navigation Studies) with a base at Toulon for the study of gyroscopes and compasses. Les Éparges was allocated to the commission. In 1929, the vessel was transferred to the better equipped Commission de détection littorale de Cherbourg (Cherbourg Coastal Detection Commission). This specialist role meant that the ship was excluded from the tonnage allowed under the London Naval Treaty signed the following year. The ship was disarmed and equipped for surveying.

Les Éparges had returned to Toulon by 1 May 1939 at the brink of the Second World War. After the Armistice of 22 June 1940, the vessel was transferred to the Marine de Vichy (Vichy French Navy) and was one of the members of the French fleet scuttled at Toulon on 27 November 1942. The vessel was raised and entered service with the German Kriegsmarine as the minesweeper M.6060. Renamed SG.25 in May 1943, with the intention of re-entering service as an escort corvette, the vessel was badly damaged in a fire on 1 March 1944 and deliberately scuttled; this time the ship was not raised.

== Bibliography ==
- Bernay, Henri (22 March 1926). "La marine de guerre et les éludes de navigation" [The navy and navigation studies]. Le Yacht: Journal de La Marine (in French). No. 2252. p. 241 – via Gallica.
- Bernay, Henri (26 January 1929). "Marine et sciences" [The Navy and Science]. Le Yacht: Journal de La Marine (in French). No. 2392. pp. 37–38 – via Gallica.
- Friedman, Norman (2011). Naval Weapons of World War One: Guns, Torpedoes, Mines and ASW Weapons of All Nations; An Illustrated Directory. Barnsley: Seaforth Publishing. ISBN 978-1-84832-100-7.
- Le Conte, Pierre (1932). Répertoire des Navires de Guerre Français [Directory of French Warships] (in French). Cherbourg: Pierre Le Conte, La Villarion, rue des Bastions. OCLC 1400324432.
- Labayle Couhat, Jean (1972). French Warships of World War II. Shepperton: Ian Allen. ISBN 978-0-71100-153-4.
- Labayle Couhat, Jean (1974). French Warships of World War I. Shepperton: Ian Allen. ISBN 978-0-71100-445-0.
- Patyanin, Sergey; Dashyan, Alexander; Barabanov, Mikhail (2021). Все корабли Второй Мировой. 10 000 кораблей, подлодок и катеров 54 стран [All ships of World War II. 10,000 ships, submarines, and boats from 54 countries] (in Russian). Moscow: ЛитРес. ISBN 978-5-04343-255-1.
- Smigielski, Adam (1985). "France". In Gardiner, Robert; Gray, Randal (eds.). Conway's All the World's Fighting Ships 1906–1921. London: Conway Maritime Press. ISBN 978-0-85177-245-5.
- Thomazi, Auguste (17 May 1930). "Les clauses accessoires du traité naval de Londres" [The ancillary clauses of the London Naval Treaty]. Le Yacht: Journal de La Marine (in French). No. 2460. p. 267 – via Gallica.
- Willmott, Hedley Paul (2010). The Last Century of Sea Power, Volume 2: From Washington to Tokyo, 1922–1945. Bloomington, Indiana: Indiana University Press. ISBN 978-0-25400-409-2.
