= French aviso Belfort =

Aviso of the French Navy

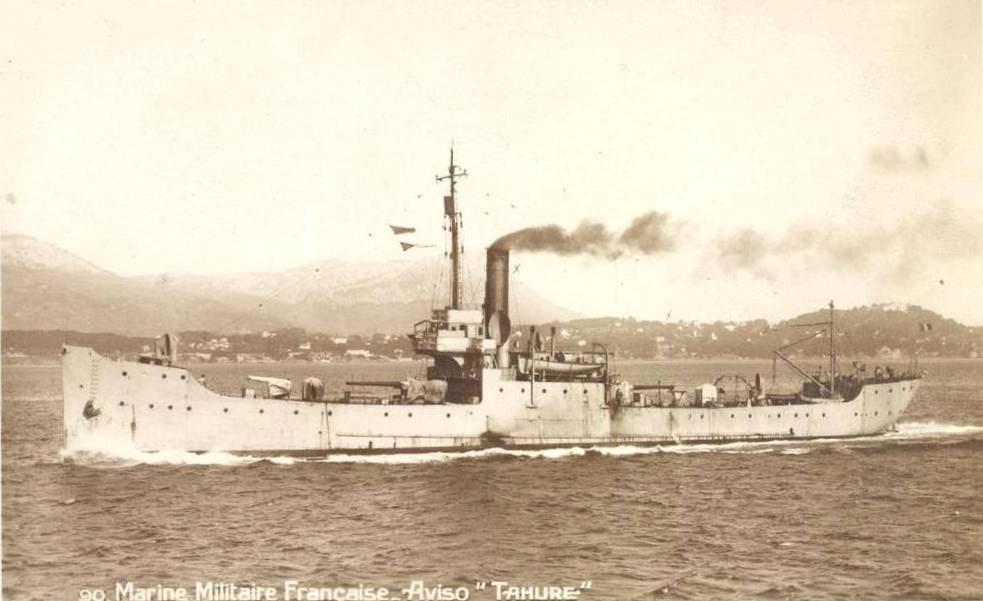
- Sister ship Tahure in 1939

History

France
- Name: Belfort
- Builder: Arsenal de Lorient, Lorient
- Laid down: 1918
- Launched: March 1919
- Commissioned: 9 May 1922
- Out of service: 26 November 1946
- Fate: Sold to be broken up

General characteristics (as built)
- Displacement: 850 long tons (864 t) standard
- Length: 74.9 m (245 ft 9 in) o/a
- Beam: 8.7 m (28 ft 7 in)
- Draught: 3.2 m (10 ft 6 in)
- Installed power: Guyot Du Temple boilers 3,000 shp (2,200 kW)
- Propulsion: Parsons steam turbines, 2 shafts
- Speed: 20.5 knots (23.6 mph; 38.0 km/h)
- Range: 3,000 nmi (5,600 km; 3,500 mi) at 11 knots (20 km/h; 13 mph)
- Complement: 103
- Armament: 2 × single 138 mm (5 in)/55 Modèle 1910; 1 × single 75 mm (3 in)/62.5 Modèle 1908; 4 × single 8 mm (0.31 in)/80 Modèle 1914 Hotchkiss; 2 × depth charge throwers

Belfort was an aviso of the Arras class, also known as the Amiens class, that was operated by Aéropostale and served in the Second World War with the Free French Naval Forces. Designed as fast escorts, the ships had a primary armament of two 138.6-millimetre (5 in) guns and depth charges. Launched in 1919, the vessel underwent testing until 1922, being then sent to Cherbourg to act as a guard ship. In 1928, Belfort was one of six avisos that were selected to support the Aéropostale airmail service between France and Brazil. Each lent for the nominal amount of one franc, the ships were ultimately responsible for the entire Atlantic crossing until they were replaced in 1930 by dedicated vessels. Belfort was then transferred to Lorient as a seaplane tender, one of the main guns being removed to accommodate a crane to lift aircraft. In this capacity, the vessel assisted in the search for survivors of a crashed Saro Cloud flying boat in 1936. During the Second World War, Belfort participated in the evacuations of Dunkirk and Le Havre and was subsequently an accommodation ship in Greenock. After the conflict, the ship was retired and sold to be broken up in 1946.

== Design and development ==
Belfort was an aviso or sloop of the Arras class, designed to serves as escort ships and ordered under the 1916 and 1917 French Navy construction plans during the First World War. Also known as the Amiens class, the ships were similar in layout to three-island merchant ships with a high bow, which meant that they sailed well in high seas, keeping their crew dry. They were considered roomy and comfortable ships, although the weight of their armament and superstructure meant that they rolled heavily.

The aviso had a length of 72 m (236 ft 2.6 in) between perpendiculars and 74.9 m (245 ft 8.8 in) overall, with a beam of 8.7 m (28 ft 6.5 in) and draught of 3.2 m (10 ft 6.0 in). Normal displacement was 850 long tons (860 t). Power was provided by two Guyot Du Temple water-tube boilers feeding two sets of Parsons geared steam turbines rated at 5,000 shaft horsepower (3,700 kW), driving two shafts and exhausting through two funnels. Design speed was 20.5 knots (38.0 km/h; 23.6 mph). A total of 220 long tons (220 t) of fuel oil was carried, which gave a design range of 3,000 nautical miles (5,600 km; 3,500 mi) at 11 knots (20 km/h; 13 mph). During fuel trials, the ship burned 1,820 kg (4,010 lb) of fuel oil an hour at a speed of 17.5 knots (32.4 km/h; 20.1 mph). The vessel had a complement of four officers and 99 other crew.

Belfort had a main armament consisting of two single 138.6-millimetre (5 in) 55 calibre Modèle 1910 guns. Each could typically fire a 39.5-kilogram (87 lb) shell at a rate of five or six rounds per minute. They were mounted on the centreline, one forward and the other aft of the superstructure. A single 75 mm (3 in) 62.5 calibre anti-aircraft gun and four 8 mm (0.31 in) 80 calibre Modèle 1914 Hotchkiss machine guns were also carried. For anti-submarine warfare, the aviso was fitted with two throwers for twenty depth charges.

== Construction and career ==
Laid down by the Arsenal de Lorient in the port of Lorient in 1918, Belfort was launched in March 1919 and completed in 1920. The vessel entered service on 22 April 1921. On 9 May 1922, the vessel completed tests and was commissioned as a guard ship at Cherbourg. Belfort was the first ship of the name in the French fleet and the last of the class to be built at the yard.

In 1928, there was no aircraft in service that could cross the South Atlantic in one trip and so the French devised an ingenious solution for their airmail service that was instigated on 1 March 1928. While mail was initially carried from Toulouse to Saint-Louis, Senegal, by Latécoère 26 mailplane and then by CAMS 51 flying boat to Praia Harbor in Cape Verde, it was then transferred to ship to be transported to Brazil, replaning in Recife to finishing its journey to Buenos Aires by Latécoère 26. Belfort was one of the six avisos allocated to the task of mail ship and lent to the French postal service Aéropostale for a nominal amount of one franc a year. After the loss of an aircraft early in the operation, the route was altered and the ships were made responsible for the entire 3,070 km (1,910 mi) journey across the Atlantic from Dakar, Senegal, to Natal, Brazil. The ships were slow and unsuited to the role, and the conditions for the crew were often harsh. They served until 1930 when they were replaced by dedicated vessels. The vessel then returned to France via Lisbon, Portugal, and Las Palmas in the Canary Islands, docking at Brest on 25 January 1931.

On 16 December 1935, Belfort was assigned to the seaplane squadrons based at Lorient. Equipped as a seaplane tender with the aft gun removed and replaced by a crane to handle aircraft, the vessel also served in Cherbourg and, from 10 July 1936, in Boulogne. The vessel supported Bréguet 521 Bizerte seaplanes that took part in the unsuccessful search for survivors of the Guernsey Airways Saro Cloud lost on 31 July. Subsequently, Belfort was also equipped to be a submarine tender as well. In May 1938, the ship was an aircraft support and recovery vessel based at Cherbourg.

During the Second World War, Belfort, after assisting in the evacuations of Dunkirk and Le Havre, arrived in Plymouth on 17 June 1940. The ship was transferred by the British to the Free French Naval Forces. The aviso served as an accommodation ship. During October 1942, the ship was transferred to Greenock, the centre for the French naval fleet, to act as a floating base for the French forces based there. At the end of the war, the ship was retired. Belfort was sold to be broken up on 26 November 1946.

== Bibliography ==
- Allaz, Camille (2004). History of Air Cargo and Airmail from the 18th Century. London: Christopher Foyle Publishing. ISBN 978-1-90257-982-5.
- Bertrand, Michel (1982). La marine française au combat, 1939-1945: Des combats de l'Atlantique aux F.N.F.L. [The French Navy in Combat, 1939-1945: From the Atlantic Battles to the F.N.F.L.] (in French). Paris: Charles-Lavauzelle. ISBN 978-2-70250-002-6.
- Friedman, Norman (2011). Naval Weapons of World War One: Guns, Torpedoes, Mines and ASW Weapons of All Nations; An Illustrated Directory. Barnsley: Seaforth Publishing. ISBN 978-1-84832-100-7.
- Layman, Richard D. (1989). Before the Aircraft Carrier: The Development of Aviation Vessels 1849-1922. London: Conway Maritime. ISBN 978-0-85177-516-6.
- Le Conte, Pierre (1932). Répertoire des Navires de Guerre Français [Directory of French Warships] (in French). Cherbourg: Pierre Le Conte, La Villarion, rue des Bastions. OCLC 1400324432.
- Labayle Couhat, Jean (1974). French Warships of World War I. Shepperton: Ian Allen. ISBN 978-0-71100-445-0.
- Smigielski, Adam (1985). "France". In Gardiner, Robert; Gray, Randal (eds.). Conway's All the World's Fighting Ships 1906–1921. London: Conway Maritime Press. ISBN 978-0-85177-245-5.
