= French aviso Bapaume =

Aviso of the French Navy

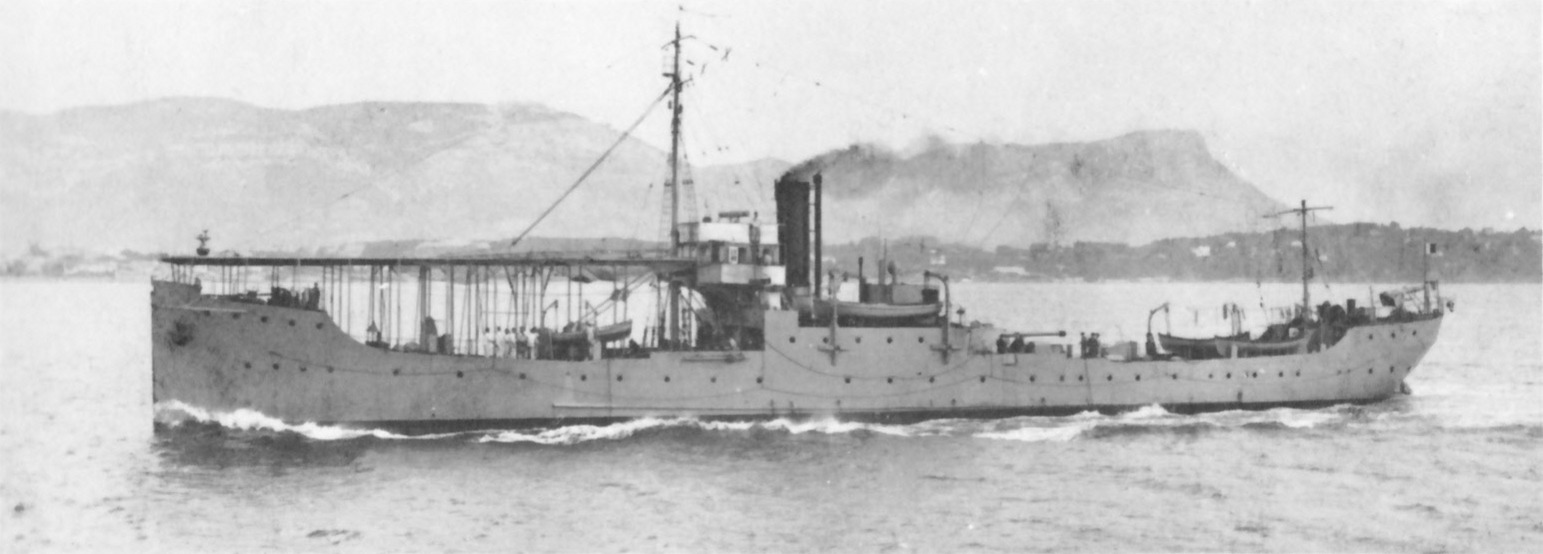
- Bapaume in 1920

History

France
- Name: Bapaume
- Namesake: Battle of Bapaume (1871) and Battle of Bapaume (March 1918)
- Builder: Arsenal de Lorient
- Laid down: 1918
- Launched: August 1918
- Commissioned: 1919
- Out of service: 31 July 1937
- Fate: Sold to be broken up

General characteristics (as built)
- Displacement: 850 long tons (864 t) standard
- Length: 74.9 m (245 ft 9 in) o/a
- Beam: 8.7 m (28 ft 7 in)
- Draught: 3.2 m (10 ft 6 in)
- Installed power: Guyot du Temple boilers 3,000 shp (2,200 kW)
- Propulsion: Parsons steam turbines, 2 shafts
- Speed: 20.5 knots (23.6 mph; 38.0 km/h)
- Range: 3,000 nmi (5,600 km; 3,500 mi) at 11 knots (20 km/h; 13 mph)
- Complement: 103
- Armament: 2 × single 138.6 mm (5 in)/55 Modèle 1910; 1 × single 75 mm (3 in)/62.5 Modèle 1908; 4 × single 8 mm (0.31 in)/80 Modèle 1914 Hotchkiss; 2 × depth charge throwers

Bapaume [bapom] was a French aviso of the Arras class, also known as the Amiens class, that operated in North Africa and was equipped with an aircraft launching platform to test the installation for wider adoption by the French Navy. Designed as fast escorts, the class had a primary armament of two 138.6-millimetre (5 in) guns and depth charges. After being launched in 1918 and an initial deployment to Algeria, the ship's main armament removed and instead was fitted with a platform forward to launch aircraft under the direction of the French naval aviator Paul Teste in 1920. The first launch of an aircraft in 1921 ended in a crash following an engine failure. Following the trials, the French Navy installed catapults on its vessels. In 1931, the ship undertook a tour of Algeria and Tunisia as part of a promotion of the Ecole Préparatoire Indigène de la Marine (Indigenous Naval Preparatory School). Bapaume was retired and sold to be broken up in 1937.

== Design and development ==
Bapaume was an aviso or sloop of the Arras class, designed to serve as escort ships and ordered under the 1916 and 1917 French Navy construction plans during the First World War. Also known as the Amiens class, the ships were similar in layout to three-island merchant ships with a high bow, which meant that they sailed well in high seas, keeping their crew dry. They were considered spacious and comfortable ships, although the weight of their armament and superstructure meant that they rolled heavily.

The aviso had a length of 72 m (236 ft 2.6 in) between perpendiculars and 74.9 m (245 ft 8.8 in) overall, with a beam of 8.7 m (28 ft 6.5 in) and draught of 3.2 m (10 ft 6 in). Normal displacement was 850 long tons (860 t). Power was provided by two Guyot du Temple water-tube boilers feeding two sets of Parsons geared steam turbines rated at 5,000 shaft horsepower (3,700 kW), driving two shafts and exhausting through two funnels. Design speed was 20.5 knots (38.0 km/h; 23.6 mph). A total of 220 long tons (220 t) of fuel oil was carried, which gave a design range of 1,400 nautical miles (2,600 km; 1,600 mi) at 11 knots (20 km/h; 13 mph). The vessel had a complement of four officers and 99 other crew.

Bapaume had a main armament consisting of two single 138.6-millimetre (5 in) 55 calibre Modèle 1910 guns. Each could typically fire a 39.5-kilogram (87 lb) shell at a rate of five or six rounds per minute. They were mounted on the centreline, one forward and the other aft of the superstructure. A single 75 mm (3 in) 62.5 calibre anti-aircraft gun and four 8 mm (0.31 in) 80 calibre Modèle 1914 Hotchkiss machine guns were also carried. For anti-submarine warfare, the aviso was fitted with two throwers for twenty depth charges.

== Construction and career ==
Laid down by the Arsenal de Lorient in the port of Lorient in 1918, Bapaume was launched in August 1918 and completed in 1919. Bapaume was the first ship of the name in the French fleet. On 30 September 1919, the ship left Toulon to sail via Leixões to Oran in Algeria.

French naval aviator Paul Teste persuaded the French Navy to convert a vessel to test whether wheeled aircraft could operate from a ship. On 1 July 1920, Bapaume returned to Toulon to be converted to operate aircraft provided by Hanriot and was subsequently deployed to the St Raphael Naval Aviation Station, where a concrete platform was constructed onshore, equipped with landing wires, to simulate shipboard landing. A platform was installed forward that was the width of the ship and 20 m (66 ft) long, which provided a take-off distance of between 15 and 18 m (49 and 59 ft) depending on the aircraft type. All armament apart from a single 75 mm gun was removed. On 14 March 1921, Teste took off from the platform for the first time, but his aircraft crashed following an engine failure. On 2 December 1922, an aircraft was filmed launching from the ship's platform as part of a publicity production for the French Navy. The vessel was subsequently used for naval aviation experiments, operating through successive years. The tests found that the launching platform was insufficient to operate aircraft safely and this encouraged the French Navy to introduce catapults on its warships.

In 1931, the ship toured ports in Algeria and Tunisia to promote the Ecole Préparatoire Indigène de la Mariné (Indigenous Naval Preparatory School), set up to provide training for the local people of the areas in naval skills. Departing from Algiers on 1 July, the vessel stopped at Mostaganem the same day, Ghazaouet, then known as Nemours, two days later, and Oran the day after that. After spending 8 and 9 July in Bougie, the ship moved on to Collo two days later and then, on 13 July, visited Philippeville, followed by, three days later, Bône and Bizerte four days after that. After spending 22 July in Tunis, Bapaume called at Sfax, Gabès and Sousse before returning to Bizerte on 31 July. On 1 January 1934, the vessel was recommissioned as a static ship based back in Algiers, although this service did not last long and, on 31 July the following year, Bapaume was decommissioned and sold to be broken up.

== Bibliography ==
- Friedman, Norman (2011). Naval Weapons of World War One: Guns, Torpedoes, Mines and ASW Weapons of All Nations; An Illustrated Directory. Barnsley: Seaforth Publishing. ISBN 978-1-84832-100-7.
- Layman, Richard D. (1989). Before the Aircraft Carrier: The Development of Aviation Vessels 1849–1922. London: Conway Maritime. ISBN 978-0-85177-516-6.
- Le Conte, Pierre (1932). Répertoire des Navires de Guerre Français [Directory of French Warships] (in French). Cherbourg: Pierre Le Conte, La Villarion, rue des Bastions. OCLC 1400324432.
- Labayle Couhat, Jean (1974). French Warships of World War I. Shepperton: Ian Allen. ISBN 978-0-71100-445-0.
- Parkes, Oscar; Prendergast, Maurice, eds. (1920). Jane's Fighting Ships 1920. Sampson Low, Marston & Company, Ltd. – via Hathitrust.
- Roche, Jean-Michel (2005). Dictionnaire des bâtiments de la flotte de guerre française de Colbert à nos jours [Dictionary of French Warships from Colbert to Today] (in French). Vol. 2: 1870-2006. Toulon: Roche. ISBN 978-2-9525917-0-6. OCLC 165892922.
- Smigielski, Adam (1985). "France". In Gardiner, Robert; Gray, Randal (eds.). Conway's All the World's Fighting Ships 1906–1921. London: Conway Maritime Press. ISBN 978-0-85177-245-5.
- Vercken, Roger (2004). "Évolution de l'Aéronautique Navale Française de 1914 à 1939" [Evolution of the French Naval Aviation from 1914 to 1939]. Pégase (in French) (114): 4–21. ISSN 0399-9939.
