= French aviso Tahure =

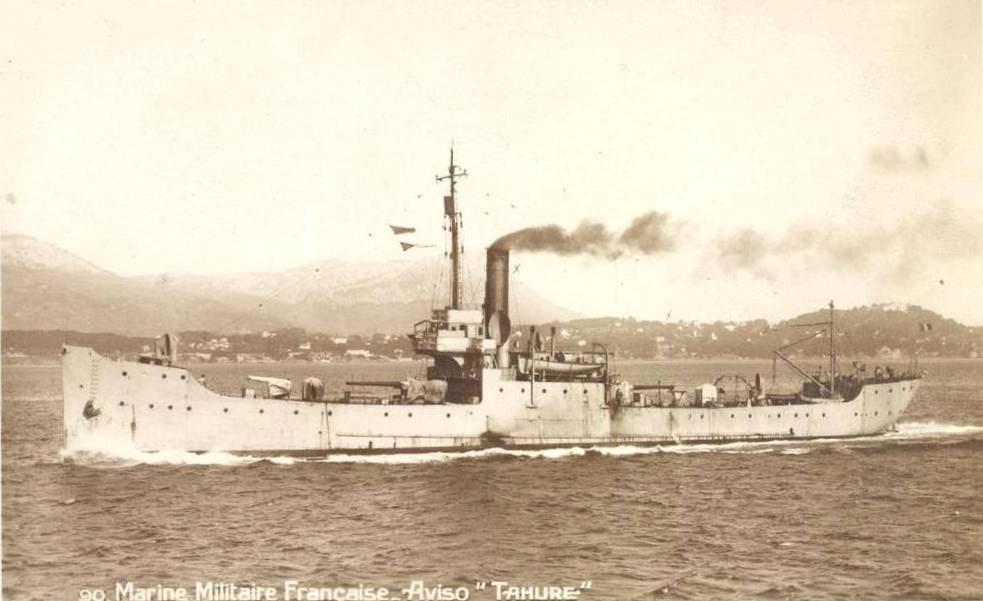
- The aviso in 1939

History

France
- Name: Tahure

General characteristics (as built)
- Class & type: Arras-class aviso
- Displacement: 850 long tons (864 t) standard
- Length: 75 m (246 ft 1 in) o/a
- Beam: 8.7 m (28 ft 7 in)
- Draught: 3.2 m (10 ft 6 in)
- Installed power: Normand boilers 3,000 shp (2,200 kW)
- Propulsion: Parsons steam turbines, 2 shafts
- Speed: 22 knots (25 mph; 41 km/h)
- Range: 3,000 nmi (5,600 km; 3,500 mi) at 11 knots (20 km/h; 13 mph)
- Complement: 4 officers, 99 sailors
- Armament: 2 × 138 mm (5 in)/55 Modèle 1910; 1 × 75 mm (3 in)/62.5 Modèle 1908; 4 × 8 mm (0.31 in)/80 Modèle 1914 Hotchkiss; 2 × Anti-submarine warfare mortars

Tahure was an Arras-class aviso built for the French Navy and launched in 1918 at the end of the First World War.

== Bibliography ==
- Smigielski, Adam (1985). "France". In Gardiner, Robert; Gray, Randal (eds.). Conway's All the World's Fighting Ships 1906–1921. London: Conway Maritime Press. ISBN 978-0-85177-245-5.
