= Paul Teste =

- Born: 2 October 1892; Lorient, France
- Died: 13 June 1925 (aged 32); Versailles, France
- Military career
- Allegiance: France
- Branch: French Navy; French Naval Aviation
- Service years: 1911-1925
- Rank: Capitaine de frégate (Frigate captain)
- Conflicts: World War I
- Awards: Legion of Honour; Croix de Guerre

Paul Marcel Teste (2 October 1892 – 13 June 1925) was a French Navy officer and aviation pioneer, notable for making France's first landing of an airplane aboard a ship. He was an advocate of the acquisition of aircraft carriers by the French Navy.

== Biography ==
=== Early life and career ===
Teste was born into a naval family at Lorient, France, on 2 October 1892 and entered the French naval academy, the École navale, in 1909, aged 17. He became a midshipman in 1911, and was promoted to enseigne de vaisseau 2e classe (ship-of-the-line ensign second class) in 1912. After graduation, he first served aboard the depot ship Duguay-Trouin then took part in a hydrographic survey cruise off Madagascar aboard the old ironclad Vauban from 1912 to 1913.

=== World War I ===
By the time France entered World War I on 3 August 1914, Teste had reached the rank of enseigne de vaisseau de 1ère classe (ship-of-the-line ensign first class). Early in the war, he served aboard light vessels in the Flanders Banks sector in the southern North Sea off Dunkirk, France. In 1916 he became second-in-command of the patrol boat Dragon.

Teste joined the Aviation Navale (French Naval Aviation) in 1917 and was based at Dunkirk, serving as an air observer aboard seaplanes manufactured by Franco-British Aviation (FBA). The FBA aircraft were outclassed by German aircraft by the spring of 1917, and during combat between four French FBA seaplanes and seven Imperial German Navy Marinefliegerkommando (Naval Aviation Command) Hansa-Brandenburg seaplanes on 26 May 1917, all four of the FBA aircraft were shot down or forced to land on the sea. Teste was among those aviators shot down that day and was captured, becoming a prisoner of war at Karlsruhe, Germany. After an unsuccessful first escape attempt, he escaped in a second attempt, crossed the German border into the neutral Netherlands on 14 January 1918, and reached France a few weeks later.

Promoted to lieutenant de vaisseau (ship-of-the-line lieutenant), Teste was convinced that seaplanes, although useful as reconnaissance aircraft, were not viable offensive weapons and that the French Navy's reliance on them was misguided. He spent the rest of the war advocating the use of lighter, faster, and more maneuverable wheeled aircraft aboard French Navy ships. Drawing upon the experience of the British Royal Navy — which by 1918 operated wheeled aircraft from the aircraft carriers HMS Argus and HMS Furious and from platforms mounted on the gun turrets of battleships and battlecruisers — he attempted France's first takeoff of a wheeled aircraft from a platform mounted aboard a ship on 9 November 1918, two days before the Armistice of 11 November 1918 brought the war to an end. The attempt — made off Corfu from a 15-metre (49-foot) platform mounted on the battleship Paris — failed when his plane plunged into the sea. He was unharmed and resumed his experiments, successfully taking off from a 15-metre (49-foot) platform aboard the aviso Bapaume, a success quickly emulated by other French naval aviators, although the experiments demonstrated that the platform was too short to permit shipboard landings.

=== Later career ===
Teste believed that it was essential for the French Navy to acquire an aircraft carrier force to demonstrate the value of wheeled aircraft at sea, reduce French Naval Aviation's reliance on land bases, and avoid a possible takeover of all land-based aviation by the French Army or a future independent French Air Force. Accordingly, at the end of World War I he was appointed to lead efforts to constitute a carrier-based aviation force, the Aviation d'Escadre ("Squadron Aviation").

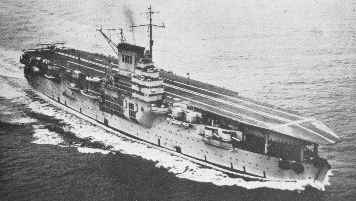
Béarn in 1937 after her conversion into an aircraft carrier. When she was still an unfinished battleship, Paul Teste conducted aviation experiments on a flight deck installed aboard her in 1920.

While overseeing the training of the crews of nine aircraft based at Saint-Raphaël, Teste received permission to use the unfinished battleship Béarn — then moored at Toulon — for experiments in operating wheeled aircraft aboard ships. Béarn still lacked a propulsion system, but she was fitted with a flight deck marked by a white stripe to aid pilots in seeing it, a system of transverse cables connected to sandbags slow aircraft landing aboard, and a target to indicate the pilot's position as he made his final approach for a landing. On 20 October 1920, Teste took off from Palyvestre in a single-seat Hanriot, flew over the harbor at Toulon, sighted Béarn's flight deck, descended to mast-top level, and made France's first shipboard landing, cutting his throttle at an altitude of 50 centimetres (20 inches) and rolling to a stop aboard Béarn in less than 30 metres (98 feet). Teste successfully repeated this experiment in the following weeks, flying a Sopwith 1½ Strutter and a three-seat Hanriot. Several other naval aviators also landed successfully aboard Béarn, and in the first ten landings only one accident occurred, when one of the arresting wires snapped, although the pilot was rescued. Eventually, 16 pilots made a combined 45 successful landings. Teste was awarded the Legion of Honour for this achievement.

Convinced that airplanes could play an important role in attacking ships at sea, Teste experimented with that idea during the French fleet maneuvers of 1921. He made a shallow dive-bombing attack on the battleship Bretagne, dropping a dummy practice bomb that landed only 20 metres (22 yards) from Bretagne's bow. During his pull-out maneuver, however, he crashed into the sea. He survived unharmed, and in 1922 received a promotion to the rank of capitaine de corvette (corvette captain) at the age of 30, which was considered a remarkable achievement at the time.

In April 1924, Teste flew from Paris to Saint-Raphaël in an FBA 17 amphibious aircraft to survey a potential route for large military seaplanes traveling from the Atlantic Ocean to the Mediterranean Sea and to assess the suitability of the Garonne and Aude river basins as landing and staging areas for seaplanes. In 20 hours of flight, he flew 2,000 kilometres (1,240 mi; 1,080 nmi) and performed 13 ground landings and 21 water landings — including stops at Bordeaux and Toulouse — without incident.

During the 1920s, Teste continued his advocacy for the acquisition of aircraft carriers. In 1925, French Minister of the Navy Jacques-Louis Dumesnil appointed Teste to his staff. When Dumesnil introduced a bill in the French Parliament concerning the organization of French Naval Aviation, Teste estimated that the French Navy needed to acquire 50 aviation squadrons.

=== Death ===
Interested in long-distance flights as well as carrier aviation, Teste decided to attempt a flight from Paris to Karachi, followed eventually by a westbound transatlantic flight from Paris to New York City, hoping both to resolve navigational challenges in long-distance reconnaissance and bombing missions and to reinvigorate a martial spirit in post-World War I France. He selected a three-seat Amiot 120 prototype bomber for the nearly 5,000 km (3,100 mi; 2,700 nmi) Paris-to-Karachi flight and began training with Lieutenant de vaisseau (Ship-of-the-Line Lieutenant) Amanrich at Villacoublay airfield at Villacoublay, France, to familiarize himself with the plane. On 13 June 1925, he and Amanrich took off from Villacoublay on a familiarization flight, but encountered turbulence just after taking off. The plane struck a tree, crashed, and burst into flames. Amanrich was unharmed, but Teste suffered horrible burns and died in agony at a hospital in Versailles a few hours later.

Soon after his death, Teste received a posthumous promotion to capitaine de frégate (frigate captain) in recognition of his contributions to French Naval Aviation.

== Namesake ==
The French Navy seaplane carrier Commandant Teste was named for Teste, and was in commission from 1932 to 1942. French Naval Aviation's biography of Teste notes that, against his advice, the French Navy continued to rely on seaplanes, took until 1927 — seven years after Teste's first landing aboard her — to complete Béarn as an aircraft carrier, and considered Béarn an experimental ship until as late as 1939, and that the French Navy's decision to name "a seaplane carrier of questionable design" after Teste was ironic.

== Honours and awards ==
- Legion of Honour
- Croix de Guerre
- Mentioned in Despatches at the Order of the Army
