= Canon de 145 L modele 1916 Saint-Chamond =

Canon de 145 L modèle 1916 Saint-Chamond
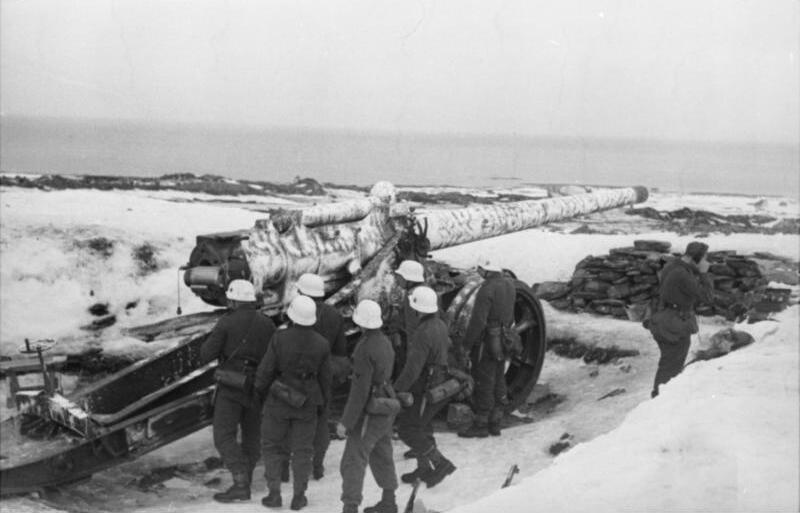
- A 14.5 cm K 405(f) emplacement in Festung Norwegen.
- Type: Heavy artillery Coastal Artillery
- Place of origin: France

Service history
- In service: 1917–1945
- Used by: France; Nazi Germany; Kingdom of Italy
- Wars: World War I World War II

Production history
- Designer: St-Chamond
- Designed: 1916
- Manufacturer: St-Chamond / Ruelle Foundry
- Produced: 1916
- No. built: 200 (WW1)
- Variants: Canon de 155 L modele 1916 Saint-Chamond

Specifications
- Mass: Travel: 13,300 kg (29,300 lb); Action: 12,500 kg (27,600 lb)
- Barrel length: 7.3 m (23 ft 11 in) 48.5 caliber
- Shell: Separate loading charge and projectile
- Shell weight: 36.2 kg (80 lb)
- Caliber: 145 mm (5.7 in)
- Breech: Interrupted screw
- Recoil: Hydro-pneumatic
- Carriage: Box trail
- Elevation: 0° to +42.5°
- Traverse: 6°
- Rate of fire: 1.5 rpm
- Muzzle velocity: 784 m/s (2,570 ft/s)
- Maximum firing range: 18.5 km (11.5 mi)

Canon de 145 L modèle 1916 Saint-Chamond or 145 L 16 was a French heavy artillery piece designed and produced during the First World War. From 1918, many were rebored to use 155 mm shells and renamed Canon de 155 L modèle 1916 Saint-Chamond (155 L 16). A number of 145 and 155 mm guns were still on hand during the Second World War and served as coastal artillery in the French, Italian and German services.

== Context ==
The French Army had been pursuing the replacement of the Canon de 155mm L Mle 1877 de Bange gun since 1909. Spurred by the events in the Russo-Japanese war of 1904–5 it was realised that relying on an old gun which was almost immobile for long range artillery support was not a viable strategy. The French Army Artillery Technical Committee produced requirements for a de Bange replacement in November 1909. The requirements included two different guns with a range of 13 to 14 km with a maximum elevation of 35 to 40 degrees and a modern mobile carriage. It was suggested the requirement could be met by modification of existing equipment (i.e. the de Bange gun). The 1909 requirement was replaced by a February 1913 one created by a committee headed by General Lamothe. The requirements included a longer range of 17 to 18 km, a calibre of 130 to 140mm and the gun was to be transportable in two loads. However, little was done before the outbreak of WW1. After the outbreak of war about 120 Canon de 155mm L Mle 1877/1914 Schneider guns which used the 155mm de Bange barrel were ordered.

In order to address the French Army's deficit of long range heavy artillery the obvious conversion of suitable calibre Naval guns to land use was undertaken. There were surplus canon de 138 mm Mle 1891 guns which had been the secondary batteries of pre-dreadnought battleships. The in service canon de 138 mm Mle 1910 was also converted to land use. Both FAMH (Saint-Chamond) (Mle 1891 - 12 guns) and Schneider (Mle 1910 - 15 guns) produced land carriages in early 1916 and mid 1917 respectively. Although these guns generally met the range requirements of the French Army, the carriages were heavy, clumsy and slow firing. Saint-Chamond also constructed 12 Canon de 145mm Mle 1910 sur affût Saint-Chamond in 1916 using bored out 138 mm Mle 1910 barrels.

== Characteristics ==
The Canon de 145 L modele 1916 Saint-Chamond can be considered as a late version of the 138 mm naval gun. It consisted of a slightly shorter (L/48.5) barrel constructed by the Ruelle Foundry, which was mounted on a Saint-Chamond carriage. The barrels were delivered in 145mm calibre with an option to bore them out to 155mm when they wore out, although this was not done during WW1. The gun was found to be very accurate with very little dispersal of shots.

The box trail was fairly conventional except for a pair of semi-circular plates at the front of the carriage. Because the gun used the cradle, recoil and recuperators of the Naval gun, there was some residual recoil which was not absorbed by the carriage. The practice was to place a pair of inclined ramps under the circular plates so the gun could ride up on these during firing and slide back down into battery. The gun was normally moved as a single unit towed by a 4-wheel drive heavy truck with auxiliary wheels under the end of the trail.

== Service ==
200 barrels from Ruelle and 160 carriages from Saint-Chamond were ordered in 1916 and the gun entered service in April 1917. This gun along with the Canon de 155mm GPF made up the equipment of the RALTs (Regiment d'Artillerie Lourde à Tracteurs) which made the heavy French artillery so effective at the end of the war. As barrels became worn they were sent back to the manufacturer to be re-bored to use standard 155 mm (6.1 in) ammunition and re-designated as the Canon de 155 L modele 1916 Saint-Chamond. These new guns continued to use the same carriages as the 145 mm guns and had similar performance with a heavier 43 kg (95 lb) projectile.

During the 1930s, an unknown quantity of 155 L 16 were sold to Italy where they were known as the Cannone da 155/45 PB. The 145 and 155 L 16 guns remained in French service at the beginning of World War II, as heavy artillery (Regiment d'Artillerie Lourde à Tracteurs) or fortress guns. After the fall of France in 1940, it is estimated 210-215 guns were captured by the Germans. In German service the 145 L 16 were known as the 14.5 cm Kanone 405 (f) or 14.5 cm K 405 (f) and employed in Atlantic Wall defenses in German-occupied Western Europe. The Germans gave French 155 L 16 guns the designation 15.5 cm K 420(f), while Italian guns were given the designation 15.5 cm Kanone 420(i).

== Photo Gallery ==
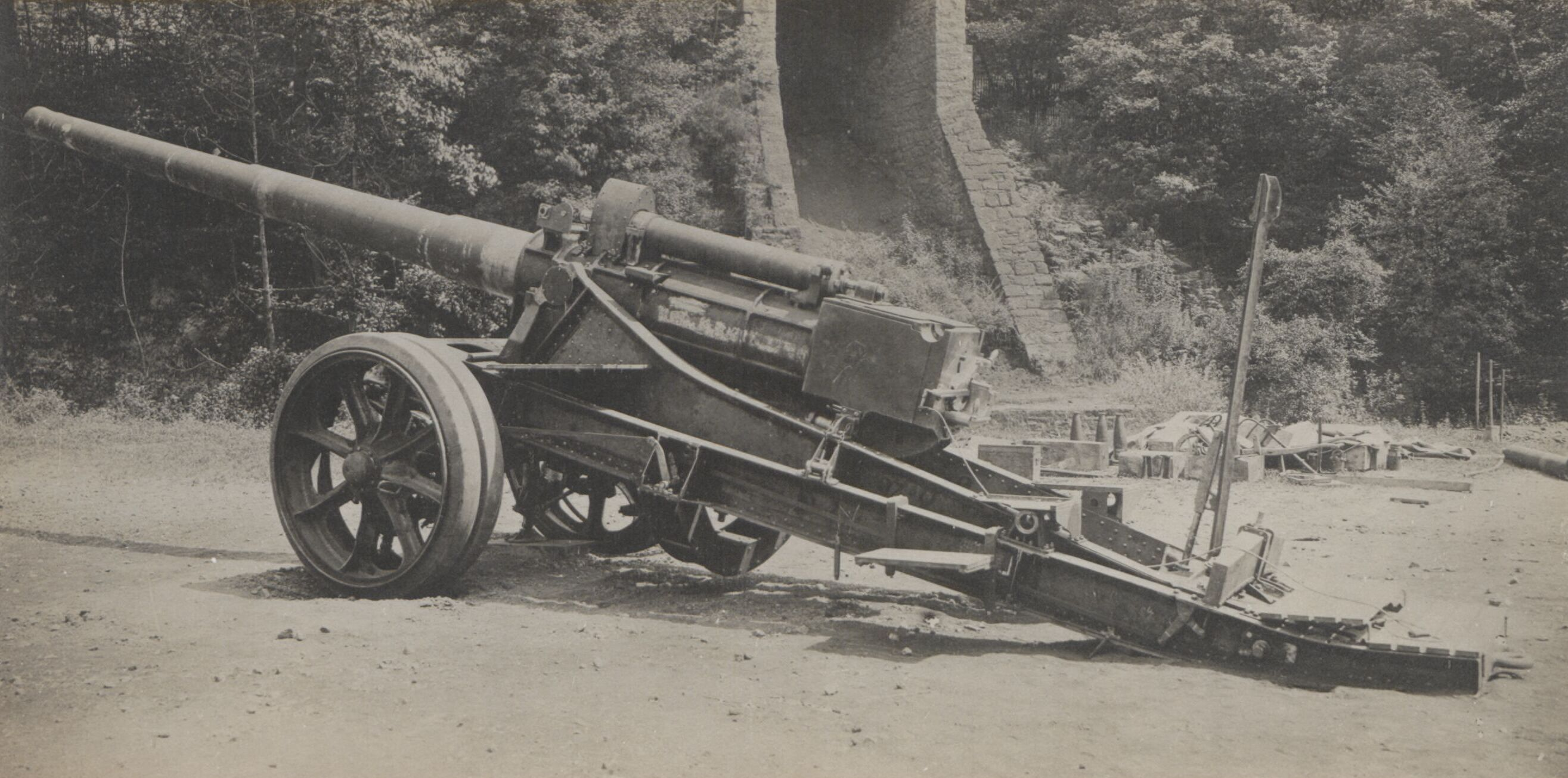
A 145 Mle 1910 Saint-Chamond during World War I.

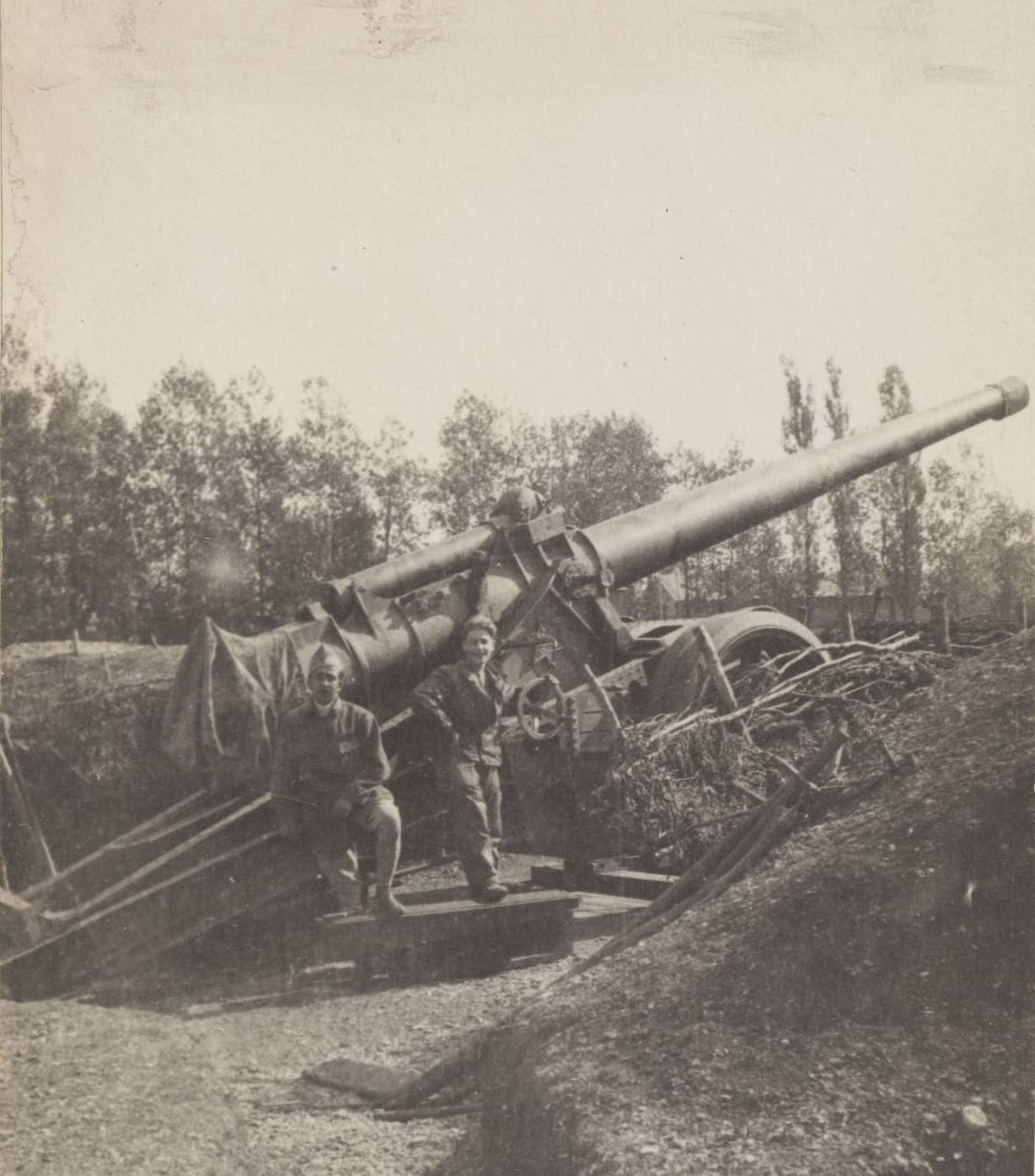
A 145 Mle 1916 in firing position during World War I.

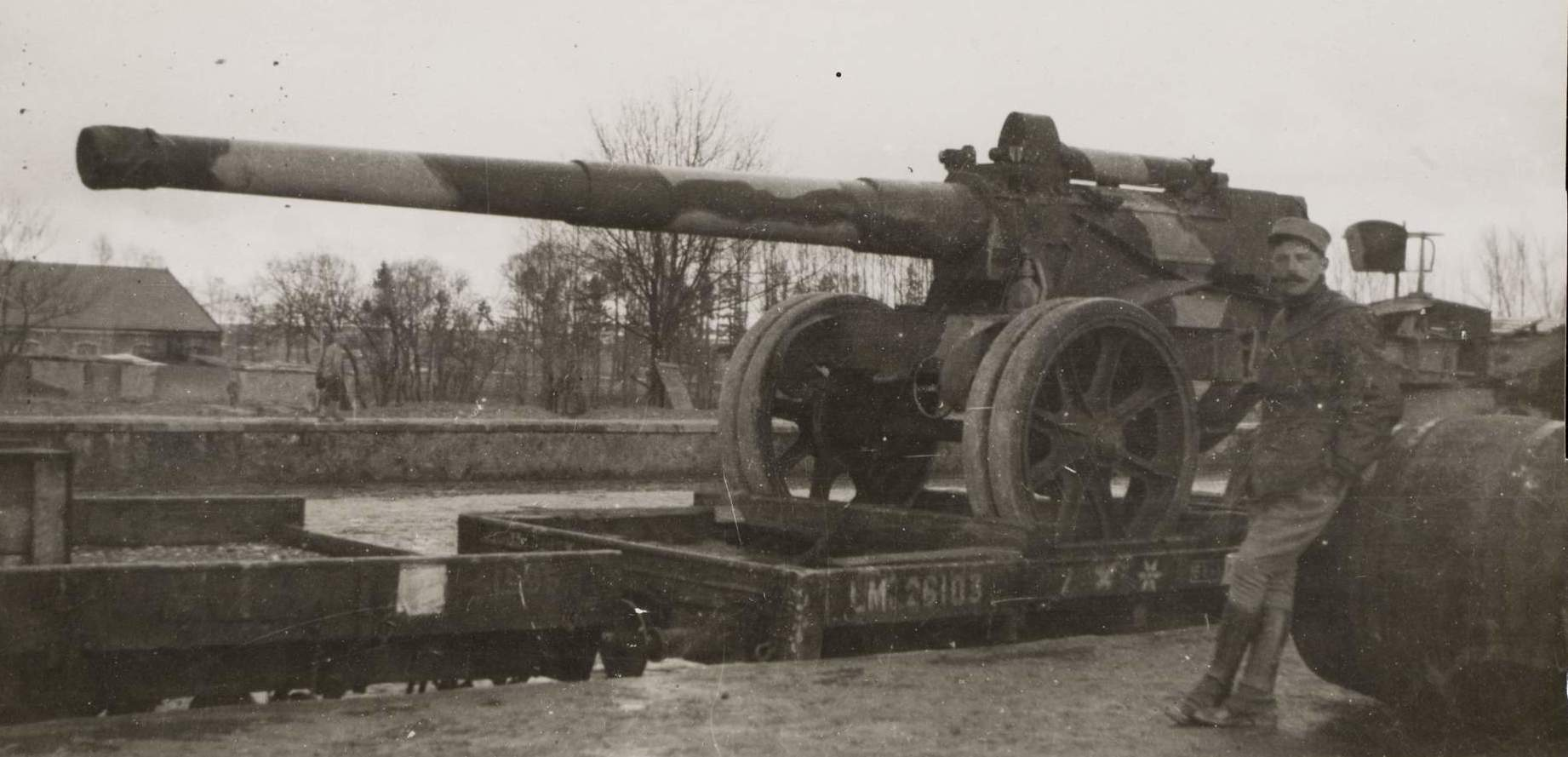
A 145 Mle 1916 in traveling position during World War I.

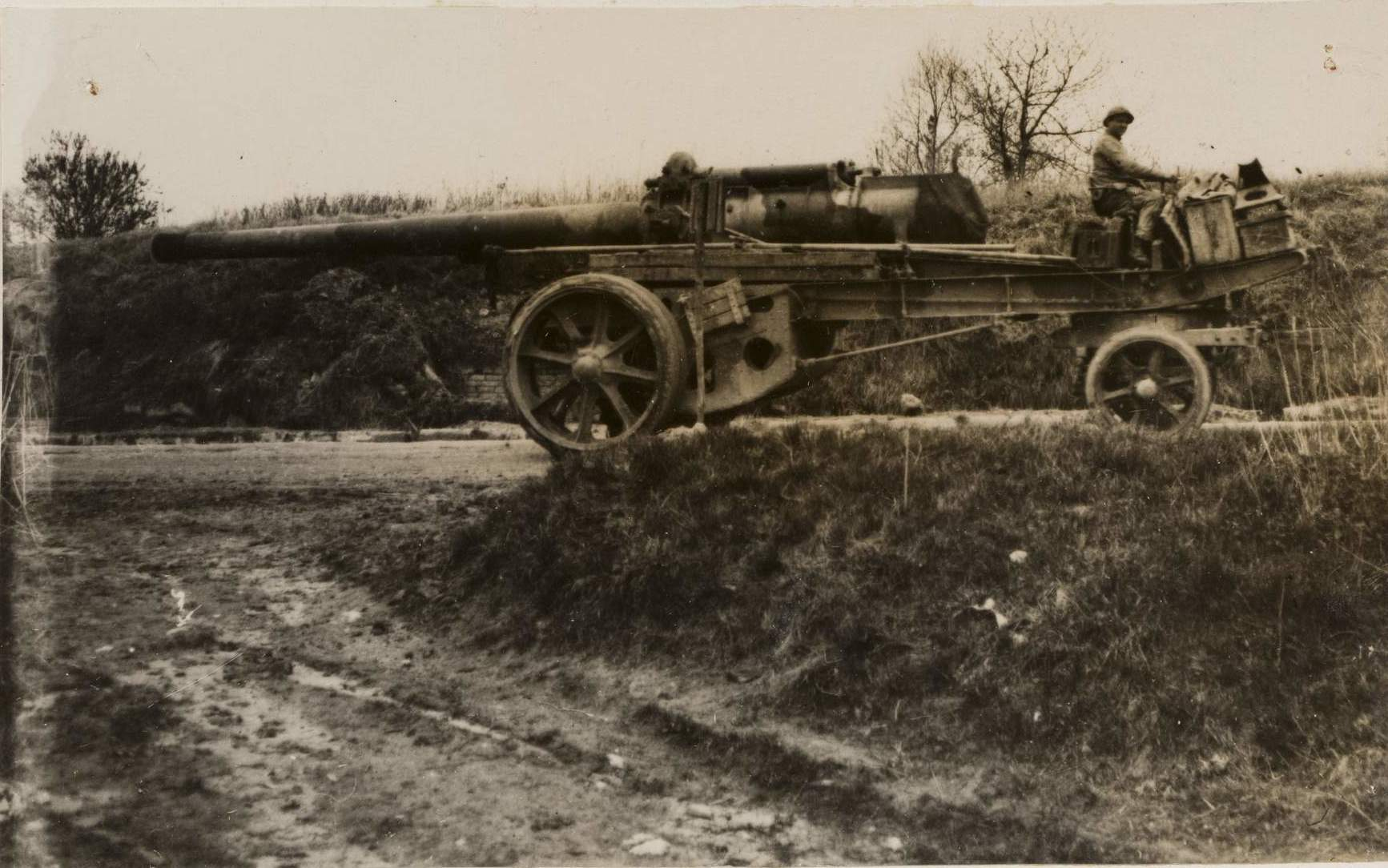
A 145 Mle 1916 with its limber during World War I.

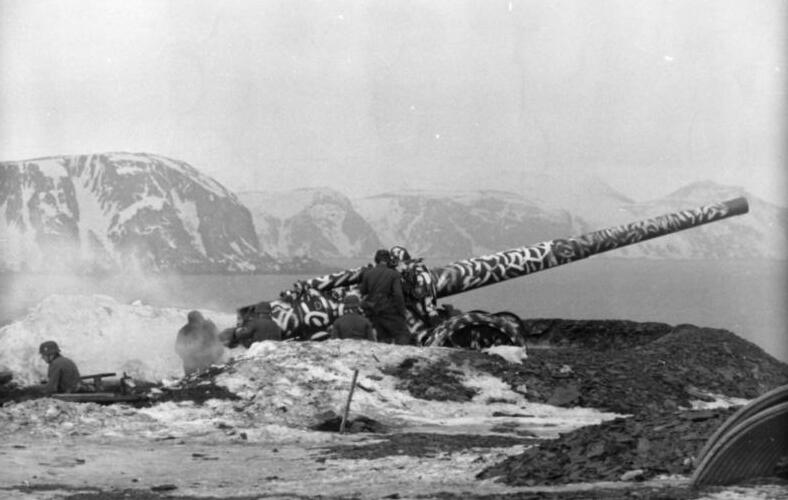
A 145 Mle 1916 in Norway during World War II.

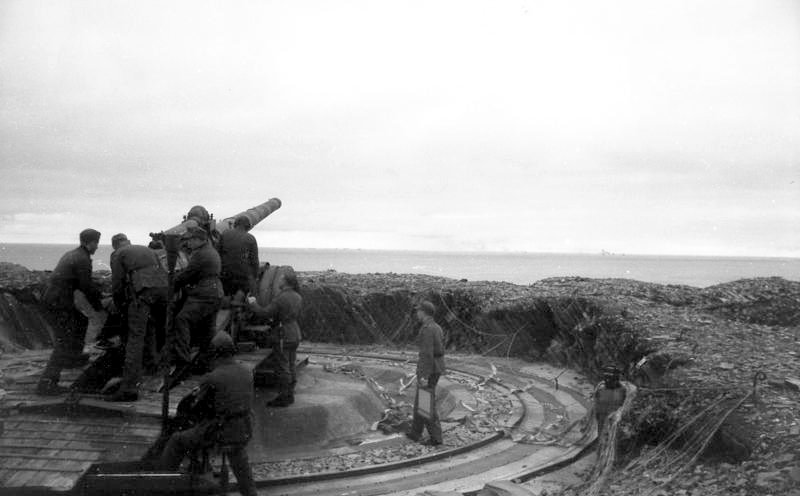
A 145 Mle 1916 on a Panama mount in Norway during World War II.

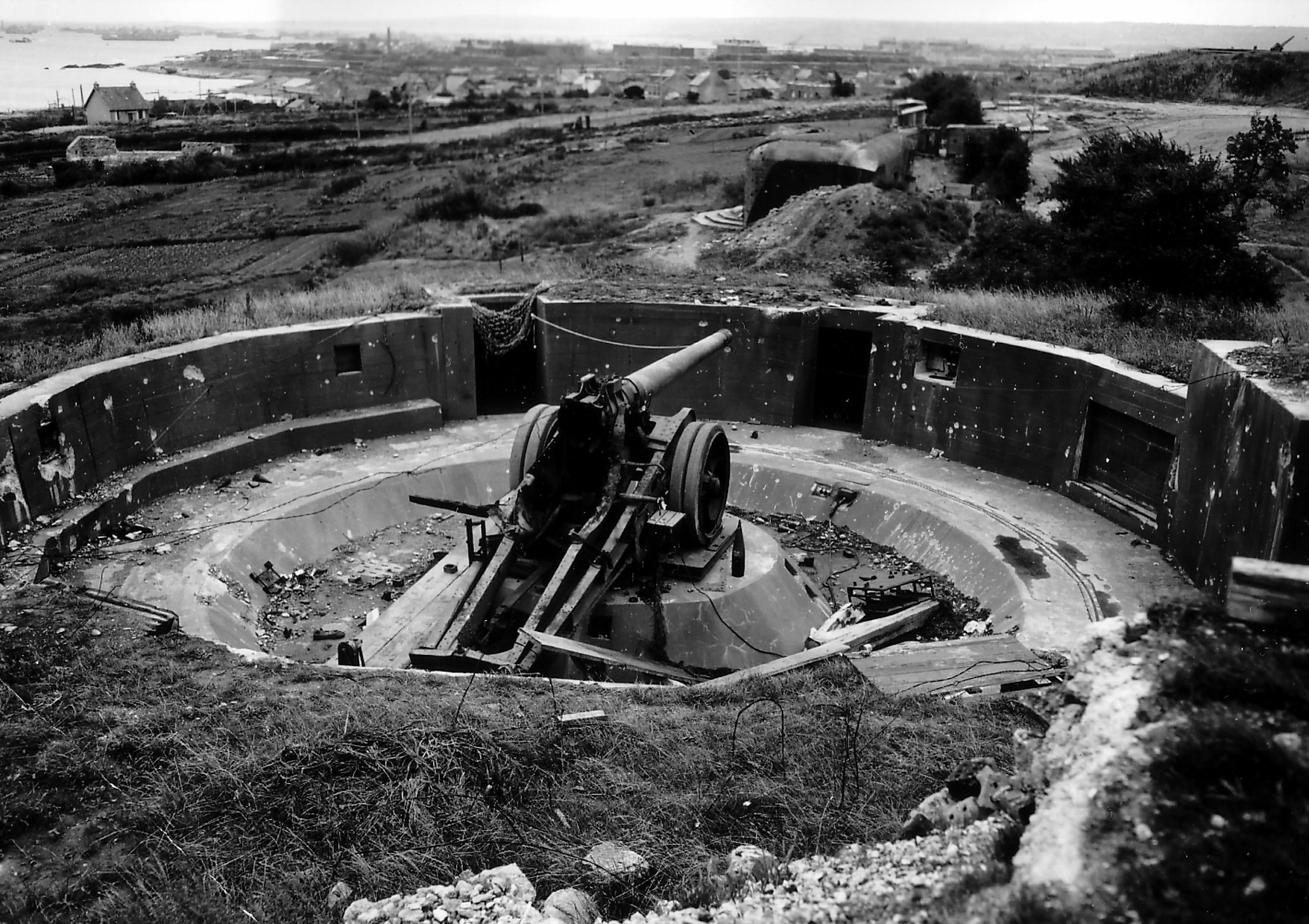
A 145 Mle 1916 on a Panama mount near Cherbourg France.

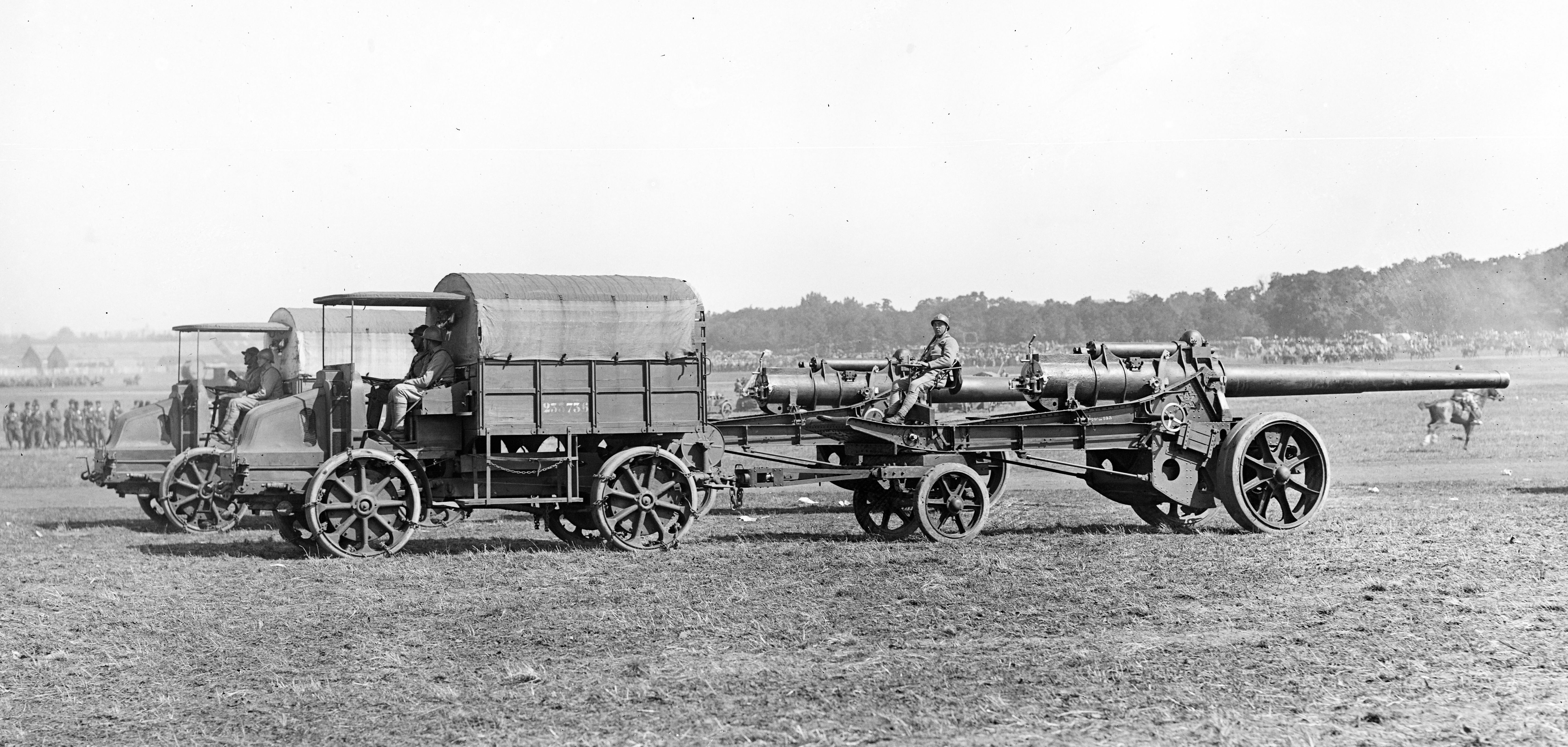
A 155 Mle 1916 in Paris on Bastille Day 1920.

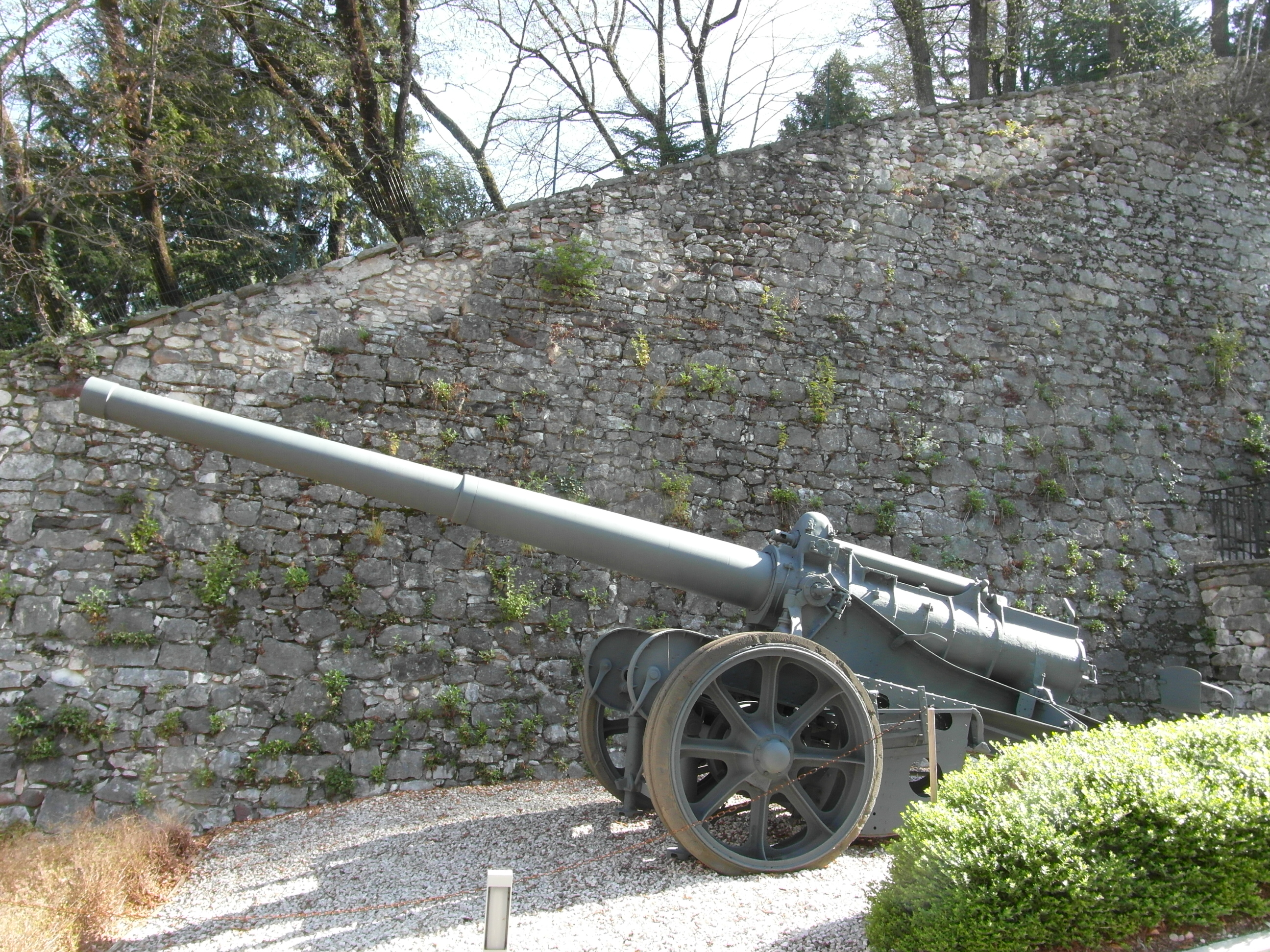
An Italian 155 Mle 1916 at the Italian War Museum in Rovereto.
