= Three-island principle =

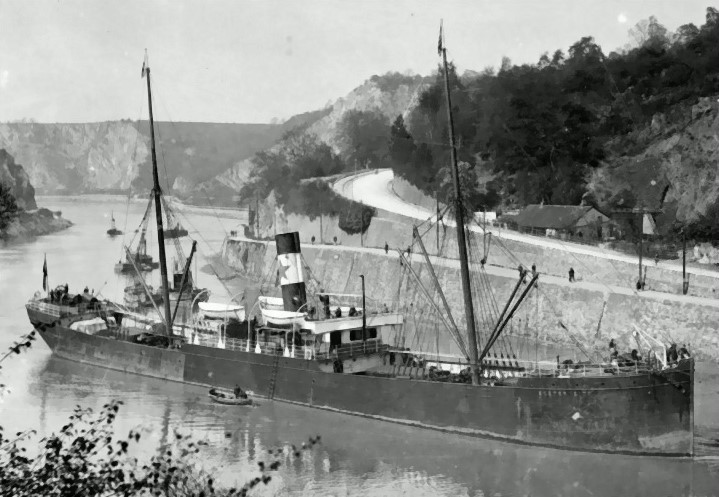
The Exeter City (1887) of the Bristol City Line was built using the three-island principle.

The three-island principle was a technique used in the construction of steel-hulled ships whereby a ship was built with a forecastle, bridge deck, and poop. The technique allowed the economical and efficient construction of ships and was particularly common in tramp steamers and smaller vessels of the nineteenth and early twentieth centuries. The Knight of Malta, for instance, a 1929 steam ferry of only 16 ft draught that operated between Malta and Sicily, was built on the principle.

== See also ==
- Deck (ship)
