= Canon de 138 mm Modèle 1910 naval gun =

Canon de 138 mm Modèle 1910
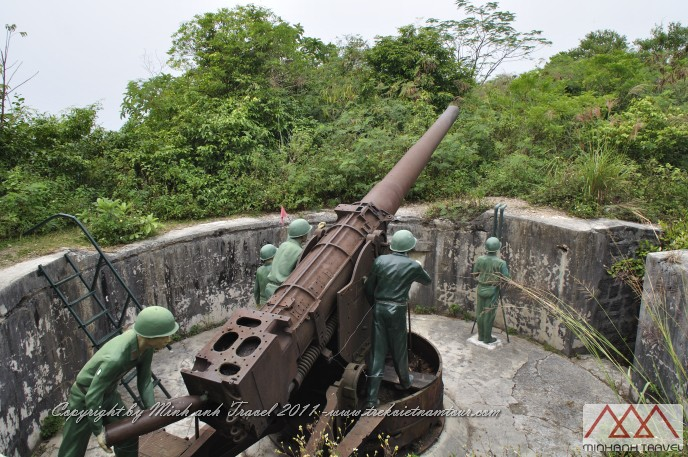
- A Modèle 1910 coastal defense gun at Cat Ba Island Vietnam.
- Type: Naval gun
- Place of origin: France

Service history
- In service: 1916–1945
- Used by: France; Nazi Germany
- Wars: World War I World War II

Production history
- Designed: 1910–1913

Specifications
- Mass: 5,320 kg (11,730 lb)
- Barrel length: ~7.623 m (25.01 ft) L/55
- Shell: 130×900mmR, separate-loading, cased charge
- Shell weight: 39.5 kg (87 lb)
- Caliber: 138.6 mm (5.46 in)
- Breech: Interrupted screw
- Elevation: -7° / +25°
- Traverse: Depending on mount
- Rate of fire: 5-6 Rounds/m
- Muzzle velocity: 790 m/s (2,600 ft/s)
- Maximum firing range: 16,100 m (17,600 yd) at 25°

The Canon de 138 mm Modèle 1910 was a medium calibre naval gun of the French Navy used during World War I and World War II. It was carried by the dreadnoughts of the Courbet and Bretagne classes as their secondary armament and planned for use in the Normandie-class battleships. It was used as the primary armament for the Arras-class sloops and planned for the La Motte-Picquet-class cruisers that was cancelled in 1915. It was also used in coast defense batteries during both World Wars.

== Design ==
The 55 caliber Mle 1910 used the typical built-up construction of its time. It had a screw breech and used separate-loading ammunition. In the battleships it was installed in armored casemates, using central pivot mounts, but no details are available. Presumably a variant of this mount was used for the sloops. Initially the casemate mount had a range of elevation from -10° to +15°, but this was later changed to -7° to +25°. The casemate mount could traverse a total of 160°.

== Coast defense duties ==
Twenty Mle 1910 guns were used by the Germans as coast defense guns along the French Mediterranean coast, although it is unclear if these guns were simply taken over by the Germans or if they were emplaced by them.

In 1942 14 guns removed from the battleships Courbet and Paris were installed in coast defence batteries at Dawlish, Hayle, Padstow, Par, Sidmouth, Port Talbot and Whitehaven in the UK. These guns were returned to France in September 1945.

== Field artillery ==
The Mle 1910 was also converted to field artillery use. Both Saint-Chamond (Mle 1891 - twelve guns) and Schneider (Mle 1910 - fifteen guns) produced land carriages in early 1916 and mid 1917 respectively. Although these guns generally met the range requirements of the French Army the carriages were heavy, clumsy and slow firing. Saint-Chamond also constructed twelve Canon de 145mm Mle 1910 sur affût Saint-Chamond in 1916 using bored out 14 cm Mle L/55 barrels. During World War I fourteen spare guns from the Bretagne class were sent to the front at Verdun where they were captured during a German attack in February 1916. The guns kept their original center pivot mounts like in the picture and were placed on concrete slabs.

== Ammunition ==
The 10.4 kilograms (23 lb) propellant charge for the Mle 1910 was contained in a cartridge case that would be used for all succeeding French guns of this caliber. Of course the actual amount of powder would vary with each gun, but it standardized the chamber size for all 138.6 mm (5.46 in) French guns.

| Shell type | Weight | Muzzle velocity | Range |
|---|---|---|---|
| semi-armor-piercing | 39.5 kg (87 lb) | 790 m/s (2,600 ft/s) | 16.1 km (17,600 yd) |
| high-explosive | 31.5 kg (69 lb) | 840 m/s (2,800 ft/s) | 15.1 km (16,500 yd) |

== See also ==
=== Weapons of comparable role, performance and era ===
- BL 5.5 inch Mark I naval gun — British equivalent
- 14 cm/50 3rd Year Type naval gun — Japanese equivalent

== Gallery ==
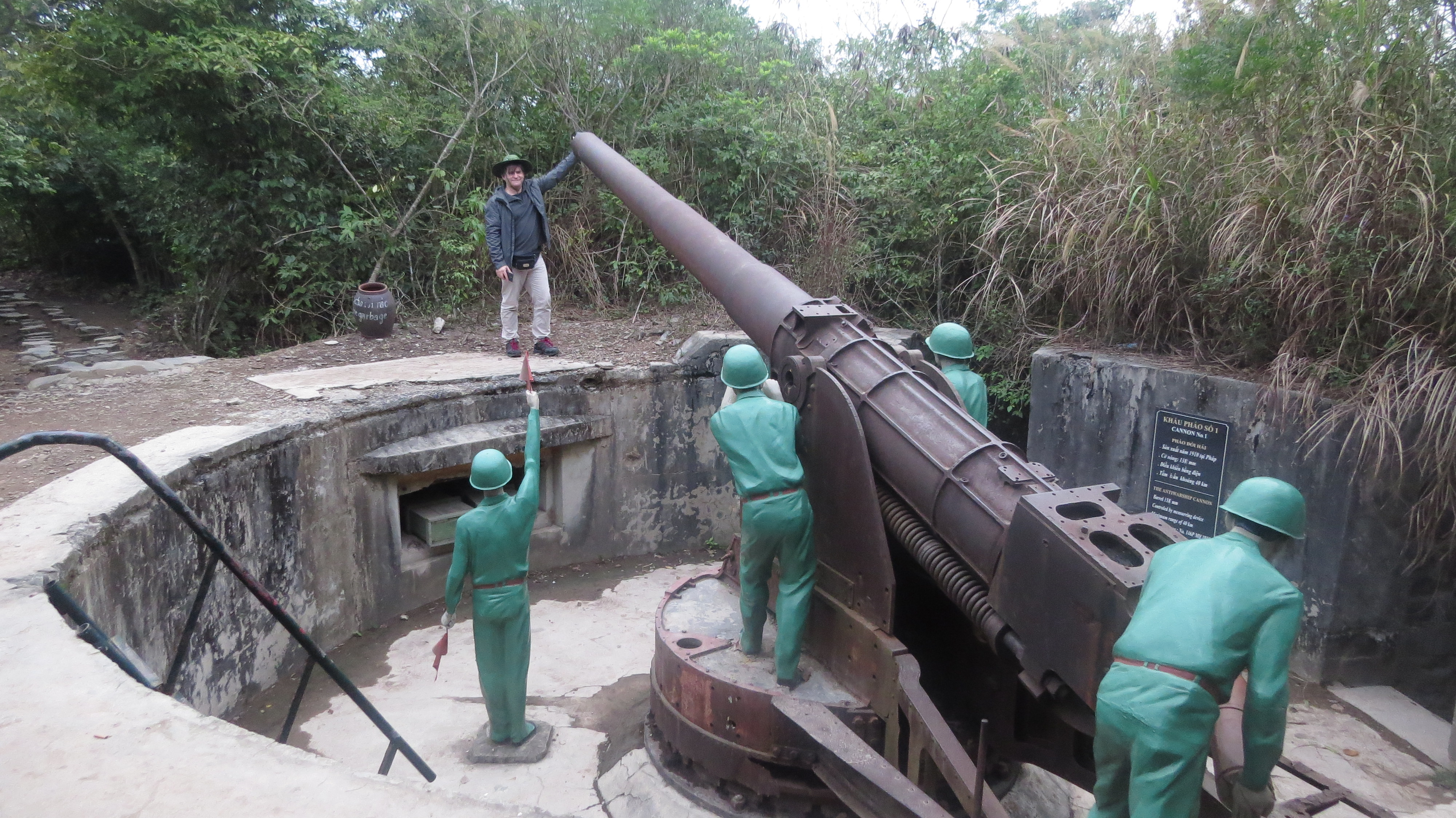
A Modèle 1910 coastal defense gun at Cat Ba Island Vietnam.

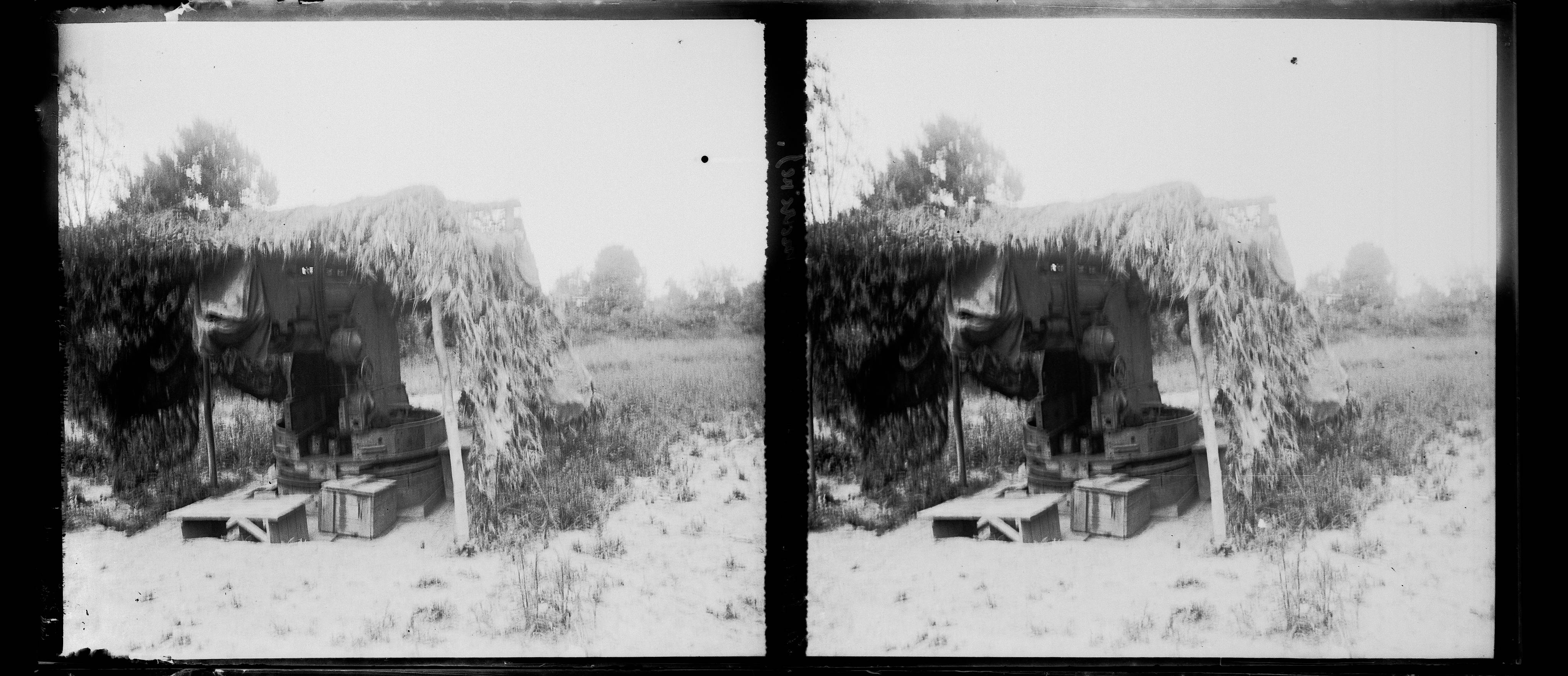
A camouflaged 138 G at La Raperie near Terny-Sorny (Aisne). During World War I.

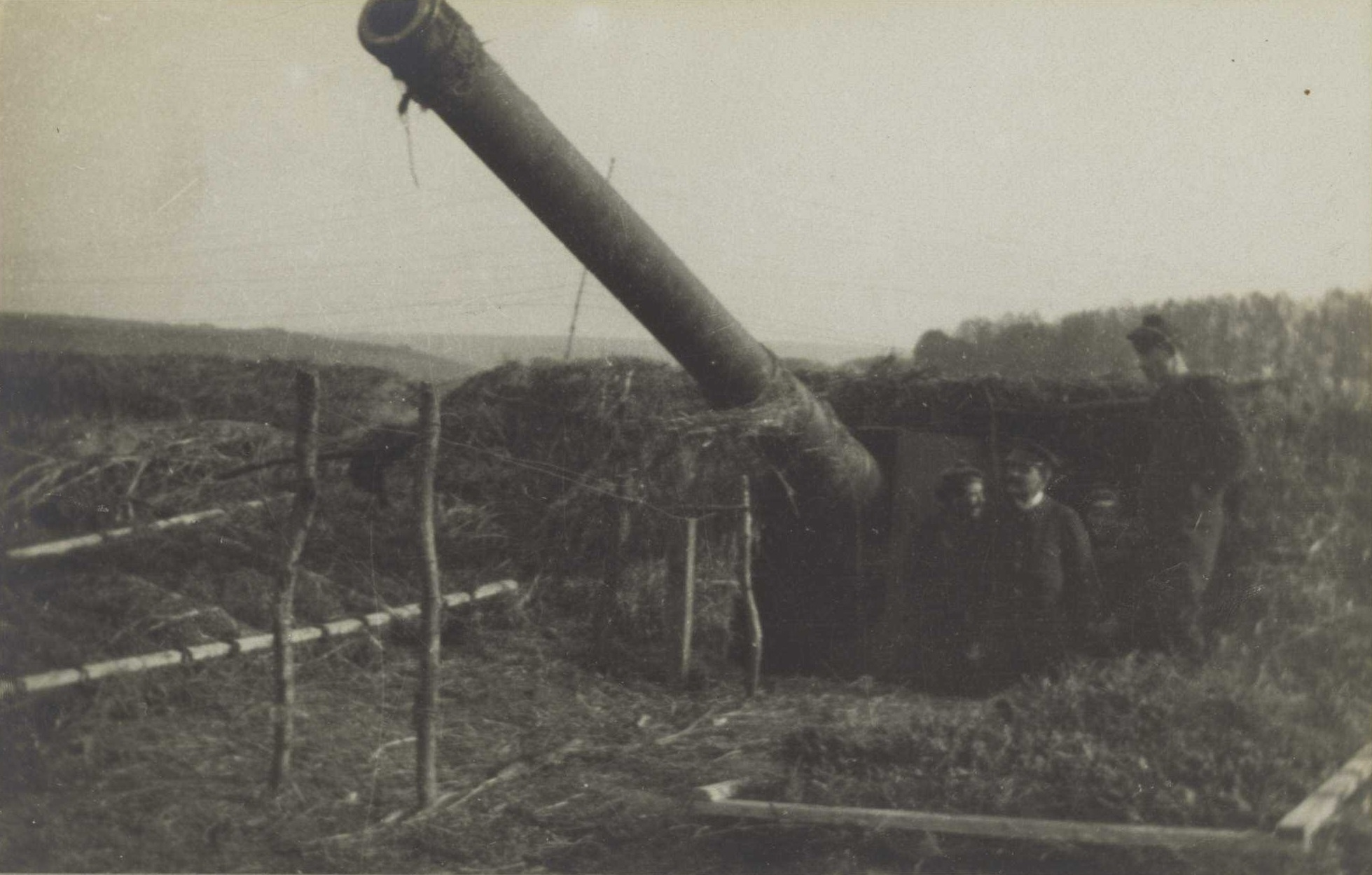
A Canon de 138 mle 1910 near Vacherauville France 1915.
