= Hotchkiss et Cie =

French arms and automobile manufacturer

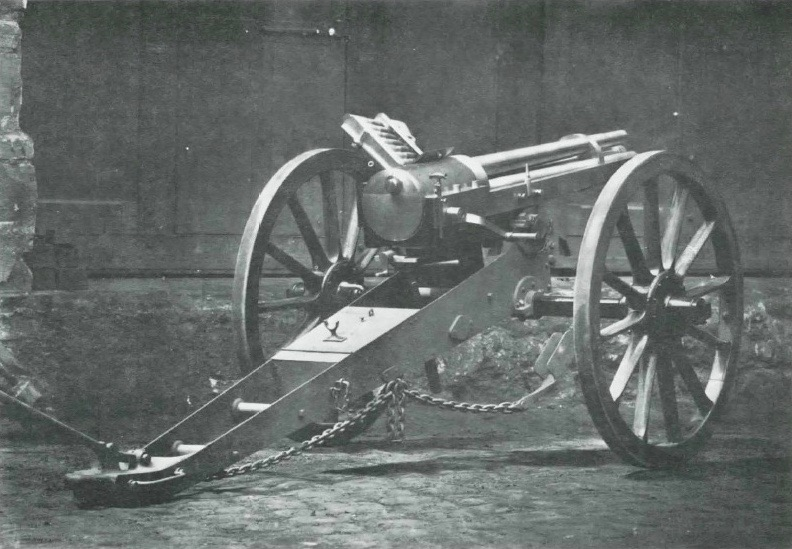
The Hotchkiss Revolving Cannon picture published 1874

Société Anonyme des Anciens Etablissements Hotchkiss et Compagnie was a French arms and, in the 20th century, automobile manufacturer first established by American gunsmith Benjamin B. Hotchkiss. He moved to France and set up a factory, first at Viviez near Rodez in 1867, manufacturing arms used by the French in the Franco-Prussian War of 1870, then moving at Saint-Denis near Paris in 1875. It was merged into and succeeded by Thomson-CSF, now Thales Group.

== Arms ==
An example of the company's output was the Hotchkiss revolving cannon (see picture from a privately circulated book dated 1874 by Alfred Koerner, later chairman of the company). The cannon had five barrels each able to fire 43 shells a minute a distance of one mile; it was made in four sizes from 37 mm to 57 mm, the largest intended for naval use. At the turn of the twentieth century, the company introduced the gas-operated Hotchkiss machine gun, a sturdy and reliable weapon which was widely used during World War I and thereafter by the French Army.

== Cars ==
At the start of the twentieth century the company started building cars. Information provided by the company for the International Universal Exhibition of 1900, at which it displayed a variety of cannons, said the St Denis factory employed around 400 staff and had 600 machine tools.

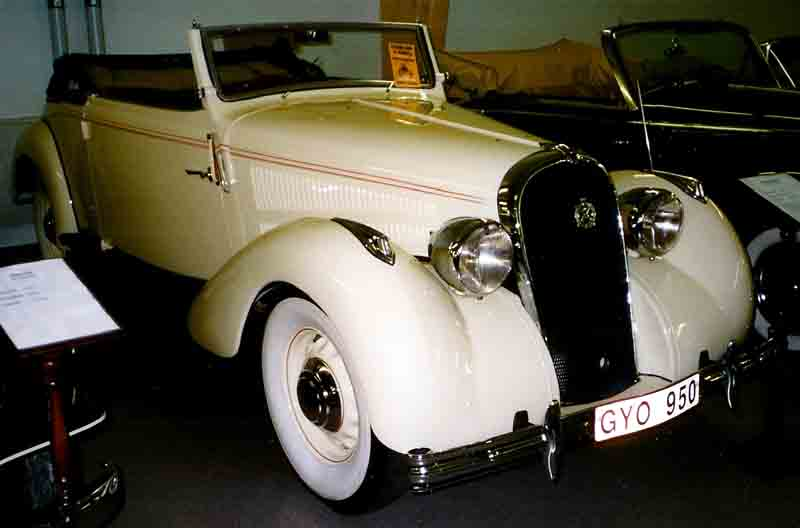
Hotchkiss 686 PN Cabriolet 1937

The first Hotchkiss car, a 17 CV four-cylinder model, appeared in 1903. The badge for the marque consisted of a pair of crossed cannons—a salute to the company's first products.

A factory fire nearly killed all projects. Despite this, a six-cylinder model followed in 1906. During World War I, they mass-produced the Hotchkiss M1914 machine gun, tank parts and other weapons. In 1933, they developed the Hotchkiss H35 tank.

In 1920, there was an unsuccessful attempt to build Hotchkiss cars by a British arm of Hotchkiss in the United Kingdom—only a prototype was made. The company made several successful racing cars. Hotchkiss racers won the Rallye Automobile Monte Carlo in 1932, 1933, 1934, 1939, 1949 and 1950.

The Hotchkiss 680 was an important model between the wars—it had a six-cylinder, 3-litre engine. In 1937, the company merged with Amilcar. J. A. Grégoire joined the company as a designer. After World War II, the 680 continued. The first new car post war was a 13 CV four-cylinder model. From 1947, two-litre flat-four models are frequently called Hotchkiss-Grégoire. In 1954, Hotchkiss purchased French manufacturer Delahaye, closing down their automotive line but continuing to produce Hotchkiss-Delahaye trucks for a few months before eliminating the Delahaye name completely. After 1954, Hotchkiss manufactured Jeeps under licence from Willys.

In 1956, Hotchkiss merged with French weapon manufacturer Brandt, producing jeeps at their factory near Paris for the French military until 1966. The firm was merged into Thomson-Houston in 1966 and in 1970 stopped producing vehicles. In the early 1970s, the Hotchkiss marque disappeared, as the French conglomerate came to be known as Thomson-Brandt. This, in turn, was nationalized in 1982 to form Thomson SA.

== Tanks ==
The Char léger modèle 1935 H, Commonly known as the Hotchkiss H35 was a light tank produced by the company in the mid-1930s. Initially designed by Hotchkiss in 1933, it was put into service in 1936. An estimated 1,200 vehicles were built between September 1936 and June 1940, however it remained in service with multiple countries as late as 1952. Unlike many other vehicles of the time, the H35 was not made of riveted rolled homogenous armoured plates – rather, it was almost entirely cast iron. This gave it increased structural strength, especially against HE (high explosive) rounds. A spiritual successor to the Renault FT, the tank was intended for a very similar role: a cavalry tank, lightly armoured, nimble, and supported by infantry. For the time, it had formidable armour and proved combat effective against German armour during the Battle of France. It was almost entirely immune to frontal fire from the Panzer II and could only be effectively neutralised by more formidable Panzer IIIs and IVs. Due to a weak main armament, many Hotchkiss H35 tanks were converted into the Hotchkiss H39 – with a slightly more powerful 37mm cannon, a more powerful engine and slightly more armour on the turret. Several Hotchkiss tanks were captured by Nazi Germany and converted to Panzerjäger (Marder I) assault guns.

== Hotchkiss drive ==
The name of the Hotchkiss firm was given to a form of power transmission from a vehicle's engine by shaft to the differential on its rear axle, which through leaf springs both locates the rear axle and transmits drive forces.

== See also ==
- Panhard
