= Hotchkiss machine gun =

Line of machineguns by Hotchkiss

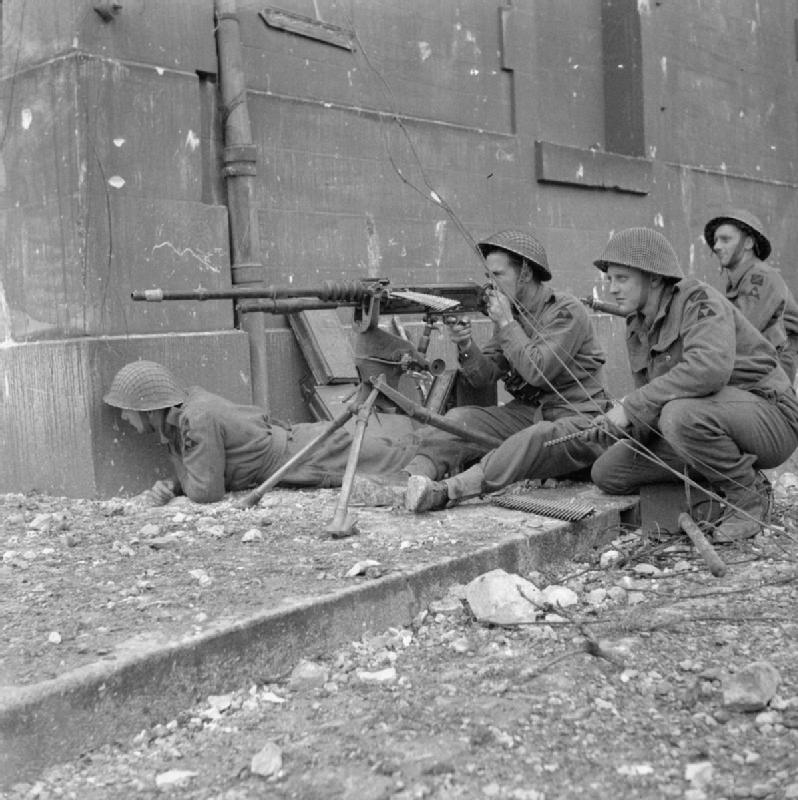
British troops firing a captured Hotchkiss machine gun during the Battle for Caen, 10 July 1944

The Hotchkiss machine gun was any of a line of products developed and sold by Hotchkiss et Cie, (full name Société Anonyme des Anciens Etablissements Hotchkiss et Cie), established by United States gunsmith Benjamin B. Hotchkiss. Hotchkiss moved to France and set up a factory, first at Viviez near Rodez in 1867, then at Saint-Denis near Paris in 1875, manufacturing arms used by the French in the Franco-Prussian War.

== Variants ==
At the turn of the twentieth century, the company introduced the gas-actuated Hotchkiss machine gun, a sturdy and reliable weapon which was widely used during World War I and thereafter by the French Army. Weapons manufactured in the Hotchkiss machine gun line include:

- Hotchkiss 1897 machine gun
- Hotchkiss M1909 Benét–Mercié machine gun, light machine gun also known as the "Hotchkiss Mark I" in British service and the "Benét–Mercié" in American service.
- Hotchkiss Mle 1914, medium machine gun
- Hotchkiss 37mm, autocannon based on the M1897-M1914 model
- Hotchkiss M1922, light machine gun
- Hotchkiss M1929, heavy machine gun
- 25 mm Hotchkiss anti-aircraft gun, autocannon but sometimes referred to as a machine gun
- Hotchkiss Type Universal submachine gun

The Hotchkiss design was also used on foreign productions:

- The Japanese Type 3 heavy machine gun
- The Type 11 light machine gun
- The Type 92 heavy machine gun
- The Italian Breda Model 1931 machine gun
- The Polish Ckm wz. 25 Hotchkiss
- The EYP Hotchkiss, a Greek modification used in World War II
