= Samochód pancerny wz. 28 =

Polish armored car

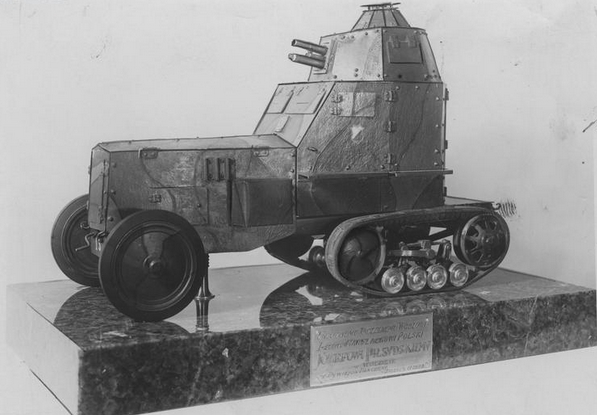
A 1932 scale model of the wz. 28 armoured car, donated to Marshal Józef Piłsudski by one of the units equipped with the vehicle

Samochód pancerny wz. 28 (literally "Armoured car, year 1928 model") was a Polish armoured car of the 1920s. Based on French-built Citroën-Kegresse B2 10CV half-track chassis (part of the Citroën Kégresse family of vehicles), the vehicle became the standard armoured car of the Polish Army. However, due to low speed and problems with reliability, already in 1933 it was decided to return the completed wz. 28 armoured cars to the factory and rebuild them as all-wheel Samochód pancerny wz. 34.

== History ==
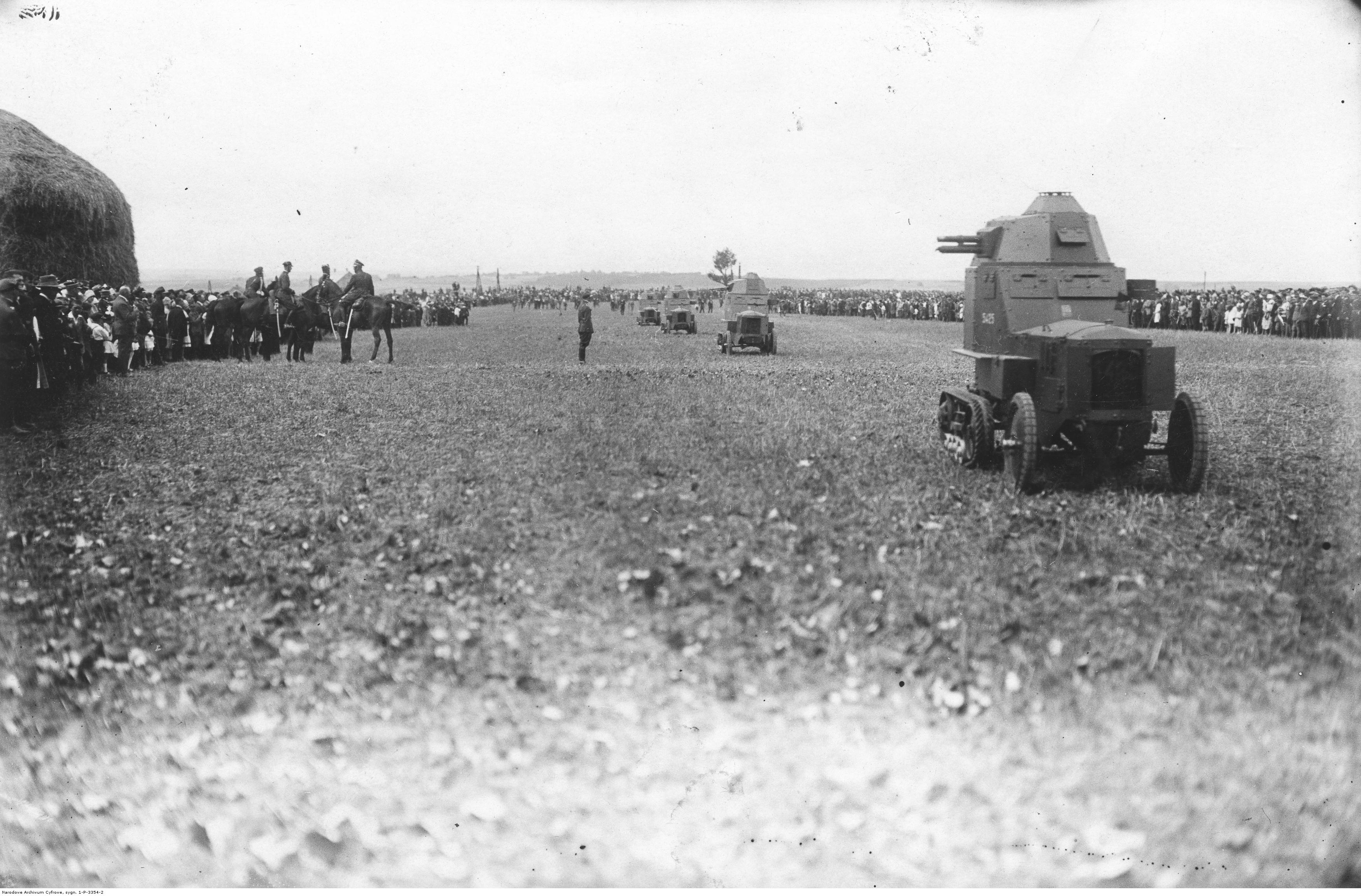
Miechów, 1927

When Poland regained her independence in 1918 and survived the Polish-Bolshevist War of 1920, the Polish Army was one of the most heavily motorised armies of the epoch and had one of the largest tank forces in the world. However, the armoured cars reinforcing Polish cavalry units were mostly obsolete. Some were captured during the war against Bolshevist Russia (like ex-Russian Austin-Putilov or Garford-Putilov), Poland also bought some AC Peugeot 18CV armoured cars from France and built a partially armoured Ford FT-B car, based on the iconic Ford Model T. However, none of them were modern by post-World War I standards and in mid-1920s it was decided to start a new line of armoured cars. In 1924 Poland bought about 130 chassis of a Citroën-Kegresse B2 10CV half-tack (essentially a Citroën Type B2 small car chassis with Kégresse track added). Some were converted to all-terrain trucks while 90 were converted to armoured cars.

The design of the wz. 28 armoured car was partially based on contemporary French designs. The final assembly took place in the Centralne Warsztaty Samochodowe works in Warsaw, while armoured plates were delivered by Baildon Steelworks. Two prototypes were delivered in 1925 and the first series was delivered to the Polish Army in 1927. The following year the new armoured cars were accepted into Polish service. Until 1930 all 90 cars have been delivered. During the production run minor changes were made to the design, most notably later cars had sloped armour. The cars came in one of two basic variants: one armed with a 37 mm Puteaux SA 18 gun, the other with one Ckm wz. 25 Hotchkiss machine gun. By 1939 all but a handful (3 or 4) were converted to wz. 34 armoured cars. The last 3 cars were sent to the Armoured Weapons' Reserve Centre 2, where they were used to form an improvised group led by Lt. Feliks Uścinski. All three were gradually lost, with the last car being destroyed by Ukrainian nationalist saboteurs.

== See also ==
- Samochód pancerny wz. 34
- AMC Schneider P 16

== Sources ==
- Szczerbicki, Tomasz (2016). "Samochody pancerne w Wojsku Polskim 1921 – 1939". Wojsko i Technika – Historia (5/2016). ISSN 2450-2480.
