= Type 1 machine gun =

Type 1 machine gun may refer to:

- Type 1 heavy machine gun, infantry heavy machine gun chambered in 7.7×58mm Arisaka, used by the Imperial Japanese Army.
- Navy Type 1 machine gun, aircraft machine gun chambered in 7.92×57mm Mauser, used by the Imperial Japanese Navy Air Service.
- Army Type 1 machine gun, aircraft heavy machine gun chambered in 12.7×81mmSR Breda, used by the Imperial Japanese Army Air Service.
