= Type 1 heavy machine gun =

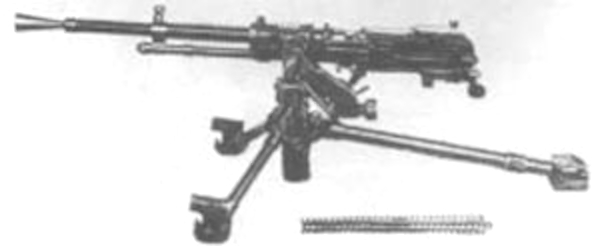
- Type: Heavy machine gun
- Place of origin: Empire of Japan

Service history
- In service: 1942 – 1945
- Used by: Imperial Japanese Army; Indonesia
- Wars: World War II; Indonesian National Revolution

Production history
- Designed: 1940 – 1941
- Produced: 1942 – 1945

Specifications
- Mass: 36.8 kg (81.13 lb) (Gun & tripod)
- Length: 1,077 mm (42.4 in)
- Barrel length: 589 mm (23.19 in)
- Cartridge: 7.7×58mm Arisaka
- Action: Gas-operated
- Rate of fire: 400–450 rounds/min
- Muzzle velocity: 770 m/s (2,500 ft/s)
- Effective firing range: 1,400 m (1,500 yd)
- Maximum firing range: 4,100 m (4,500 yd)
- Feed system: 30-round Metal feed trays
- Sights: Blade front sight with rear peep sight, graduated from 100 to 2,200 meters, with provision for mounting a telescope.

The Type 1 heavy machine gun (一式重機関銃, Ichi-shiki jū-kikanjū) was a heavy machine gun used by the Imperial Japanese Army during the later stages of the Second World War. Though seemingly intended to replace the older Type 92 heavy machine gun, the weapon never underwent the same level of mass production as its predecessor due to either material shortages or the fact that the Type 92 heavy machine gun was deemed as acceptable.

== Description ==
The Type 1 is essentially a smaller, lighter version of the Type 92 heavy machine gun. It employs the same principles of operation, simply with scaled down components. The barrel is designed to be rapidly changed in the field to prevent overheating, as a result the barrel cooling rings were reduced in size and the barrel jacket was done away with entirely. It was fed from 30-round brass feed strips. The overall rate of fire was higher than that of the Type 92 heavy machine gun. Like previous Japanese heavy machine gun models, the Type 1 was strip fed with 30 round strips. It was mounted in the same way as previous Japanese machine guns and issued to machine gun companies at the battalion level.

== See also ==
- Type 3 heavy machine gun
- Type 92 heavy machine gun
- Hotchkiss M1914 machine gun
