= French aviso Liévin =

Aviso of the French Navy

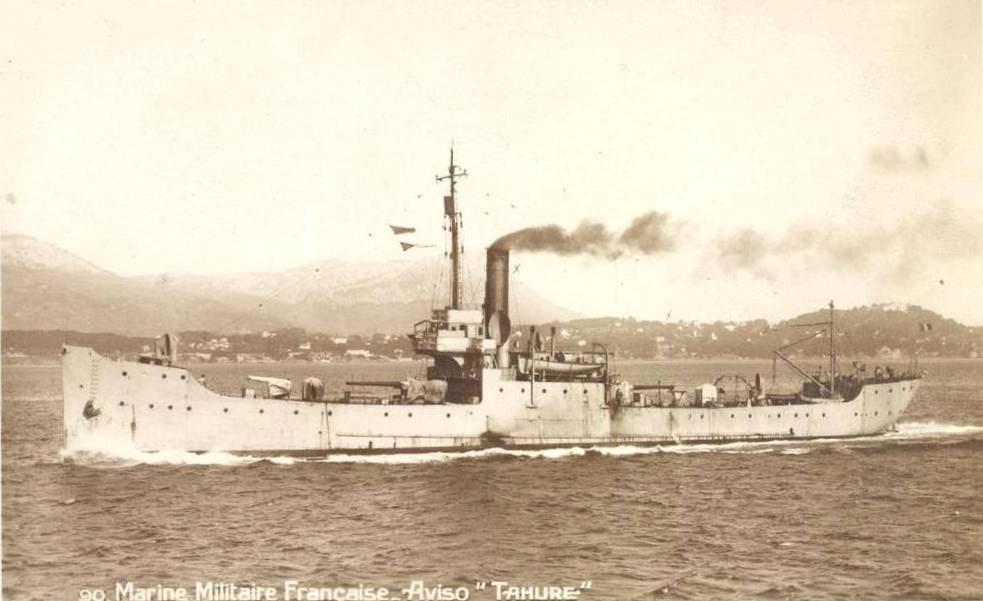
- Sister ship Tahure in 1939

History

France
- Name: Liévin
- Builder: Chantiers de la Méditerranée, La Seyne-sur-Mer
- Laid down: 1917
- Launched: 1920
- Out of service: 1936
- Fate: Sold to be broken up

General characteristics (as built)
- Displacement: 850 long tons (864 t) standard
- Length: 74.9 m (245 ft 9 in) o/a
- Beam: 8.7 m (28 ft 7 in)
- Draught: 3.2 m (10 ft 6 in)
- Installed power: Guyot du Temple boilers 3,000 shp (2,200 kW)
- Propulsion: Parsons steam turbines, 2 shafts
- Speed: 18 knots (21 mph; 33 km/h)
- Range: 3,000 nmi (5,600 km; 3,500 mi) at 11 knots (20 km/h; 13 mph)
- Complement: 103
- Armament: 2 × single 138.6 mm (5 in)/55 Modèle 1910; 1 × single 75 mm (3 in)/62.5 Modèle 1908; 4 × single 8 mm (0.31 in)/80 Modèle 1914 Hotchkiss; 2 × depth charge throwers

Liévin was an aviso of the Arras class, also known as the Amiens class, ordered by the French Navy towards the end of the First World War. Designed as fast escorts, the ships had a primary armament of two 138.6-millimetre (5 in) guns and depth charges. Launched in 1920, the vessel initially served in Toulon before joining the Escadre de Méditerranée (Mediterranean Squadron). As a coal-fired aviso, Liévin was suited to operate away from the oil bunkers that often warships relied on at the time and was assigned to combat the Red Sea slave trade. As well as operations from Alexandria, Istanbul, Mersin and Port Said, the vessel undertook a tour of the Greek islands in 1924. In 1925, the aviso served as part of a blockade of Morocco during the Rif War and then served as a training ship alongside the battleships Condorcet and Courbet in 1930. In 1936, the ship was sold and broken up.

== Design and development ==
Liévin was a member of the Arras or Amiens class, a class of thirty fast avisos or sloops that were designed to serve as escort ships and ordered under the 1916 and 1917 French Navy construction plans. The ships were similar in layout to three-island merchant ships with a high bow, which meant that they sailed well in high seas, keeping their crew dry. They were considered roomy and comfortable ships, although the weight of their armament and superstructure meant that they rolled heavily.

The aviso had a length of 72 m (236 ft 2.6 in) between perpendiculars and 74.9 m (245 ft 8.8 in) overall, with a beam of 8.7 m (28 ft 6.5 in) and draught of 3.2 m (10 ft 6.0 in). Normal displacement was 850 long tons (860 t). Power was provided by two Guyot du Temple water-tube boilers feeding two sets of Parsons geared steam turbines rated at5,000 shaft horsepower (3,700 kW), driving two shafts and exhausting through two funnels. Design speed was 18 knots (33 km/h; 21 mph), and a total of 200 long tons (200 t) of coal was carried, which gave a design range of 3,000 nautical miles (5,600 km; 3,500 mi) at 11 knots (20 km/h; 13 mph). The ship had a complement of four officers and 99 other crew.

Liévin had a main armament consisting of two single 138.6-millimetre (5 in) 55 calibre Modèle 1910 guns. Each could typically fire a 39.5-kilogram (87 lb) shell at a rate of five or six rounds per minute. They were mounted on the centreline, one forward and the other aft of the superstructure. A steel shield was added to the guns in 1928. A single 75 mm (3 in) 62.5 calibre anti-aircraft gun and four 8 mm (0.31 in) 80 calibre Modèle 1914 Hotchkiss machine guns were also carried. The anti-aircraft gun was derived from a 1897 field gun and could typically fire a 7.4-kilogram (16 lb) shrapnel shell at a rate of 20 rounds per minute. For anti-submarine warfare, the aviso was fitted with two throwers for twenty depth charges.

== Construction and career ==
Laid down by Chantiers de la Méditerranée at their shipyard in La Seyne-sur-Mer in 1917, Liévin was launched in 1920. The first ship of the name in the French fleet, after completing trials, the vessel joined the fleet at Toulon. Due to the aviso's reliance on coal, rather than the more difficult to obtain fuel oil that powered many of the rest of the class, Liévin was deployed against the Red Sea slave trade, serving off the coast of Somalia.

On 11 March 1923, Liévin was sent to rescue the US Navy destroyer Overton, which had run aground off Port Said, but the other ship was refloated without assistance. On 27 November, the vessel, alongside sister ships Baccarat, Béthune and Montdement, joined the light cruiser Mulhouse as part of the revived Escadre de Méditerranée (Mediterranean Squadron). The fleet was to serve between Alexandria and Mersin, although temporarily the squadron was sent to Istanbul. On 30 July 1924, the aviso was sent to represent French forces in the eastern Mediterranean at a regatta held at Port Said. On 2 August, the ship undertook a tour of the Greek islands, and, on 2 November, was based in Beirut alongside Béthune.

After a visit to Famagusta on 12 January 1925, the ship was in Piraeus on 20 February. During the Rif War, the success of the Riffian force under Abd el-Krim led to Spain agreeing with France on joint responsibility for the security of the coastline of their north African colonies. In particular, the countries were concerned about arms imports to the Riffian army. On 8 June, the aviso joined Béthune in a blockade of the northern coast. On 12 April 1930, Liévin joined the Fifth Sloop Squadron, serving alongside the battleships Condorcet and Courbet in a training role. The vessel was retired and, on 2 October 1936, sold to be broken up.

== Bibliography ==
- Friedman, Norman (2011). Naval Weapons of World War One: Guns, Torpedoes, Mines and ASW Weapons of All Nations; An Illustrated Directory. Barnsley: Seaforth Publishing. ISBN 978-1-84832-100-7.
- Le Conte, Pierre (1932). Répertoire des Navires de Guerre Français [Directory of French Warships] (in French). Cherbourg: Pierre Le Conte, La Villarion, rue des Bastions. OCLC 1400324432.
- Labayle Couhat, Jean (1974). French Warships of World War I. Shepperton: Ian Allen. ISBN 978-0-71100-445-0.
- Smigielski, Adam (1985). "France". In Gardiner, Robert; Gray, Randal (eds.). Conway's All the World's Fighting Ships 1906–1921. London: Conway Maritime Press. ISBN 978-0-85177-245-5.
