= Walking your fire =

Walking your fire is a tactical targeting technique in which a weapon is fired and the result is observed for the purpose of applying a correction factor, to put the next round closer to the target. The practice may involve rapid-fire weapons such as machine guns, indirect-fire weapons such as mortars and some other types of artillery, and it may be applied to successive aerial bombing runs.

It may be implemented by a single individual. The weapon operator (gunner) fires one or more rounds of ammunition, and the impact point is noted, either by an observer or by the gunner. The aiming point of the weapon is adjusted, and the process is repeated as necessary. Small caliber automatic weapons, either belt or magazine fed, may include a small amount of tracer ammunition (usually 5% or less) in with regular munitions, to facilitate the process under low-light conditions.

The main role of an artillery observer is to assist friendly artillery in accurately attacking a target. The observer will communicate instructions to the friendly forces to adjust their fire, "walking" it onto the target. Similarly, a forward air controller will help friendly air units adjust their aim in subsequent airstrikes.

The name results from the fact that the sequence of rounds striking near the target appear to be walking toward the target. It contrasts with the aimed shots of semi-automatic (or bolt action, single-shot, etc.) fire, in which the first shot is placed on target through the use of a targeting device, which may be as simple as iron sights, or as sophisticated as smart-bomb technology.
