= French aviso Baccarat =

Aviso of the French Navy

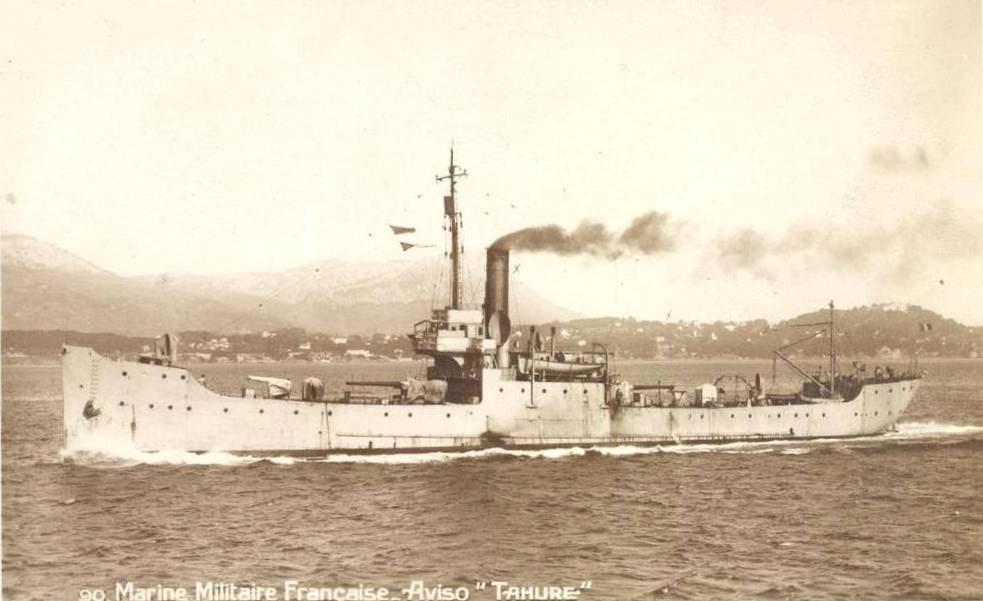
- Sister ship Tahura in 1939

History

France
- Name: Baccarat
- Builder: Chantiers et Ateliers de Provence, Port-de-Bouc
- Laid down: 1919
- Launched: 1921
- Completed: 1922
- Out of service: 1934
- Fate: Sold to be broken up

General characteristics (as built)
- Displacement: 850 long tons (864 t) standard
- Length: 74.9 m (245 ft 9 in) o/a
- Beam: 8.7 m (28 ft 7 in)
- Draught: 3.2 m (10 ft 6 in)
- Installed power: Normand boilers 3,000 shp (2,200 kW)
- Propulsion: Parsons steam turbines, 2 shafts
- Speed: 18 knots (21 mph; 33 km/h)
- Range: 3,000 nmi (5,600 km; 3,500 mi) at 11 knots (20 km/h; 13 mph)
- Complement: 103
- Armament: 2 × single 138 mm (5 in)/55 Modèle 1910; 1 × single 75 mm (3 in)/62.5 Modèle 1908; 4 × single 8 mm (0.31 in)/80 Modèle 1914 Hotchkiss; 2 × depth charge throwers

Baccarat was an aviso of the Arras class, also known as the Amiens class, ordered by the French Navy at the end of the First World War. Designed as fast escorts, the ships had a primary armament of two 138.6-millimetre (5 in) guns and depth charges. Launched in 1921, the vessel was initially deployed to Toulon and, in 1923, joined the Escadre de Méditerranée (Mediterranean Squadron). Baccarat was deployed to ports across the Mediterranean Sea, including Alexandria, Beirut and Port Said. In 1924, the ship was damaged while returning the bodies of French sailors that had been killed during the First World War and buried on Cyprus. After returning to Toulon in 1928, the ship was sold in 1934 and broken up.

== Design and development ==
Baccarat was a member of the Arras or Amiens class, a class of thirty fast avisos or sloops, designed to serve as escort ships and ordered under the 1916 and 1917 French Navy construction plans. The ships were similar in layout to three-island merchant ships with a high bow, which meant that they sailed well in high seas, keeping their crew dry. They were considered roomy and comfortable ships, although the weight of their armament and superstructure meant that they rolled heavily. Baccarat was the twenty-first member of the class.

The aviso had a length of 72 m (236 ft 2.6 in) between perpendiculars and 74.9 m (245 ft 8.8 in) overall, with a beam of 8.7 m (28 ft 6.5 in) and draught of 3.2 m (10 ft 6.0 in). Normal displacement was 850 long tons (860 t). Power was provided by two Guyot Du Temple water-tube boilers feeding two sets of Parsons geared steam turbines rated at5,000 shaft horsepower (3,700 kW), driving two shafts and exhausting through two funnels. Design speed was 18 knots (33 km/h; 21 mph), and a total of 200 long tons (200 t) of coal was carried, which gave a design range of 3,000 nautical miles (5,600 km; 3,500 mi) at 11 knots (20 km/h; 13 mph). The ship had a complement of four officers and 99 other crew.

Baccarat had a main armament consisting of two single 138.6-millimetre (5 in) 55 calibre Modèle 1910 guns. Each could typically fire a 39.5-kilogram (87 lb) shell at a rate of five or six rounds per minute. They were mounted on the centreline, one forward and the other aft of the superstructure. A steel shield was added to the guns in 1928. A single 75 mm (3 in) 62.5 calibre anti-aircraft gun and four 8 mm (0.31 in) 80 calibre Modèle 1914 Hotchkiss machine guns were also carried. The anti-aircraft gun was derived from a 1897 field gun and could typically fire a 7.4-kilogram (16 lb) shrapnel shell at a rate of 20 rounds per minute. For anti-submarine warfare, the aviso was fitted with two throwers for twenty depth charges.

== Construction and career ==
Laid down by Chantiers et Ateliers de Provence in Port-de-Bouc in 1919, Baccarat was launched in 1921 and completed in 1922. The first ship of the name in the French fleet, after completing trials, the vessel joined the fleet at Toulon. Due to the aviso's reliance on coal, rather than the more difficult to obtain fuel oil that powered many of the rest of the class, Baccarat was deployed against the Red Sea slave trade. On 27 November 1923, the vessel, alongside sister ships Béthune, Liévin and Montdement, joined the light cruiser Mulhouse as part of the revived Escadre de Méditerranée (Mediterranean Squadron). The fleet was to serve between Alexandria and Mersin, although temporarily the squadron was sent to Istanbul. With Béthune, Baccarat was stationed, on 11 February 1924, at Beirut. On 4 March, the ship was deployed to Alexandria and then Port Said. The port was the centre for the French Navy's Levant operations, including resupply missions for French forces in the region, and the aviso supported the naval fleet operating from there.

On 7 August, Baccarat escorted the gunboat Capricieuse to Bizerte for repairs. On 16 November, the vessel was towed back from Argostoli by the tugboat Travailleur after being damaged.while returning the bodies of four French sailors that had been buried there during the First World War. The ship sailed to Toulon on 6 January 1925 but returned to the Escadre de Méditerranée, visiting Famagusta alongside a general deployment of the squadron in the Mediterranean Sea on 22 November. On 20 May the following year, the aviso made a visit to Massawa, then in Italian Eritrea. In early November 1927, while stationed at Chania, the ship refuelled the aircraft flown by a French pilot attempting to fly from Paros to Beirut. On 6 February 1928, the aviso arrived back to Toulon having sailed back via Naples. Baccarat was retired, on 27 November 1934, put up for sale through an auction and broken up.

== Bibliography ==
- Friedman, Norman (2011). Naval Weapons of World War One: Guns, Torpedoes, Mines and ASW Weapons of All Nations; An Illustrated Directory. Barnsley: Seaforth Publishing. ISBN 978-1-84832-100-7.
- Le Conte, Pierre (1932). Répertoire des Navires de Guerre Français [Directory of French Warships] (in French). Cherbourg: Pierre Le Conte, La Villarion, rue des Bastions. OCLC 1400324432.
- Labayle Couhat, Jean (1974). French Warships of World War I. Shepperton: Ian Allen. ISBN 978-0-71100-445-0.
- Smigielski, Adam (1985). "France". In Gardiner, Robert; Gray, Randal (eds.). Conway's All the World's Fighting Ships 1906–1921. London: Conway Maritime Press. ISBN 978-0-85177-245-5.
