= Type 92 heavy machine gun =

Type 92
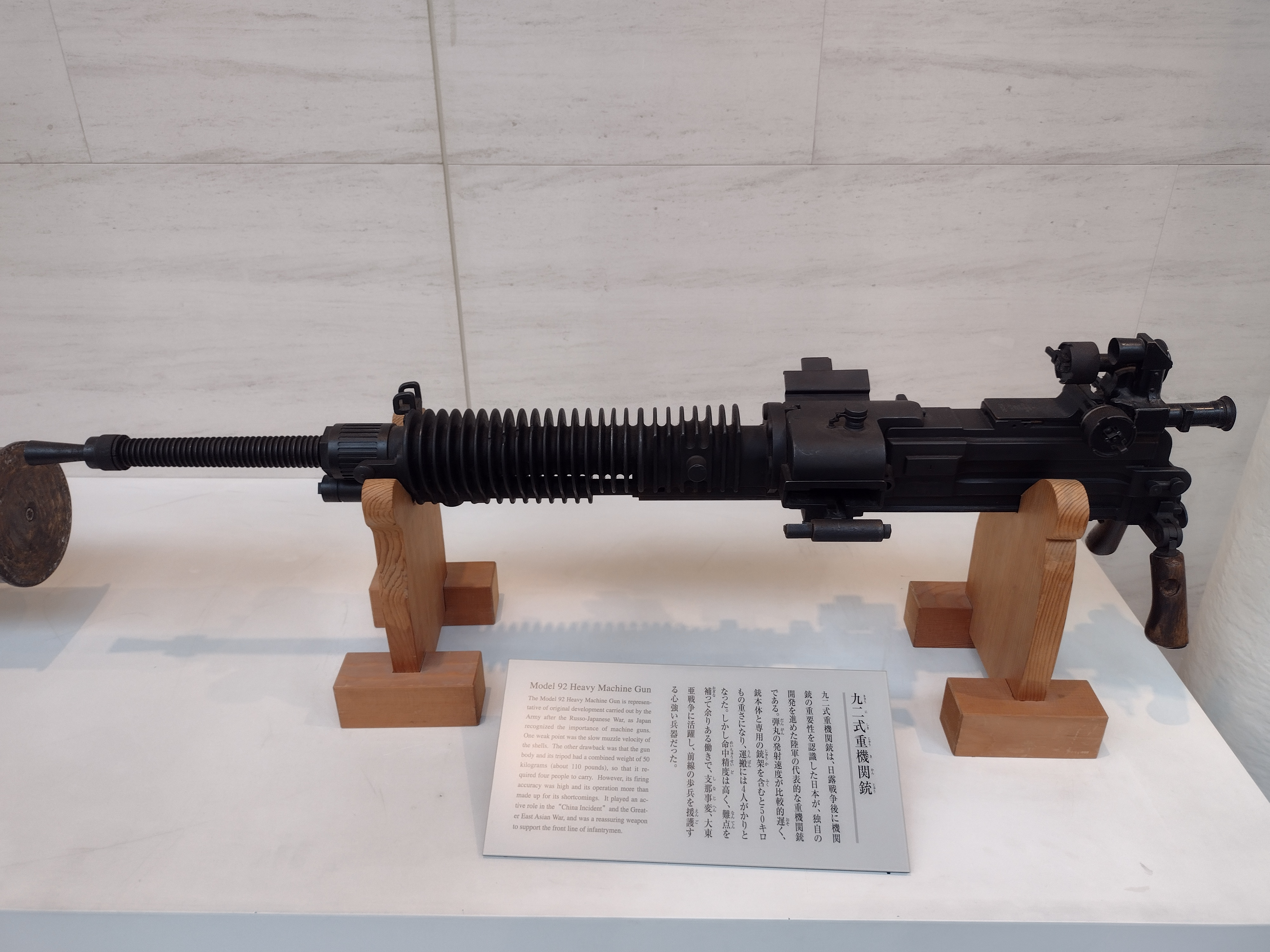
- Type 92 machine gun on display
- Type: Heavy machine gun
- Place of origin: Empire of Japan

Service history
- In service: 1932–1950s
- Used by: See Users
- Wars: Second Sino-Japanese War; World War II; Hukbalahap Rebellion; Chinese Civil War; Indonesian National Revolution; First Indochina War; Korean War; Vietnam War

Production history
- Designer: Kijiro Nambu
- Designed: 1932
- Produced: 1932–45
- No. built: 45,000

Specifications
- Mass: 55.3 kg (122 lb) w/ tripod
- Length: 1,156 mm (45.5 in)
- Barrel length: 721 mm (28.4 in)
- Cartridge: 7.7×58mm Type 92
- Action: Gas-operated
- Rate of fire: 450–500 rounds per min
- Muzzle velocity: 780 m/s (2,600 ft/s)
- Effective firing range: 800 m (870 yd)
- Maximum firing range: 4,500 m (4,900 yd)
- Feed system: 30-round Hotchkiss-type metal strip

The Type 92 heavy machine gun (九二式重機関銃, Kyūni-shiki jū-kikanjū) is a Japanese heavy machine gun, related to the Hotchkiss machine gun series. It entered service in 1932 and was the standard Japanese heavy machine gun used during World War II. The Type 92 was similar in design to the earlier Type 3 heavy machine gun but chambered to fire the improved 7.7mm rimmed or semi-rimmed round. Known for its reliability, it was used after the war by various forces in East Asia. Designed by Kijiro Nambu and built by Hino Motors and Hitachi, its total production was about 45,000 guns. Type 92 refers to the Japanese Imperial year 2592 – 1932 in the Gregorian calendar – in which the gun entered service.

== Design ==
The Type 92 was essentially a scaled-up version of the Type 3 heavy machine gun, with its calibre increased to 7.7 mm, and like the Type 3 was air cooled, ammo strip-fed, and based on the Hotchkiss M1914. It could use both a rimless and semi-rimmed 7.7×58mm Shiki round. A 7.7mm Arisaka round could be used if necessary or if other ammunition supplies dwindled. Rounds fired from the gun traveled at about 730 m/s (2,400 ft/s), and the rate of fire was about 450 rpm. It was sometimes used as a light anti-aircraft gun during the Pacific War. It was nicknamed "the woodpecker" by Western Allied soldiers because of the characteristic sound it made when fired due to its relatively low rate of fire, and the "chicken neck" (Chinese: 雞脖子) by Chinese soldiers due to its appearance. The Type 92 had a maximum range of 4,500 meters, but a practical range of 800 meters.

The gun was intended to be fired on a tripod with a team of three men. The tripod was designed with removable carry poles, so that the weapon could be transported fully assembled for quicker deployment.

An unusual characteristic of this gun was the placement of its iron sights – canted slightly to the right instead of the centre. A number of different sights were produced for the weapon, the Type 93 and Type 94 periscopic sights as well as the Type 96 telescopic sight. A ring-type anti-aircraft sight was also produced.

Problems with this weapon included the use of 30-round feed strips, which did not allow for as high a volume of fire as a belt-fed gun, and the oiler, which enabled better extraction in clean conditions but could bring dirt inside the gun in the field. The gun has an internal oil pump which is mechanically activated by the bolt. The oil pump dispenses a small amount of oil onto a brush, which then lubricates each cartridge as it is fed into the gun.

== Combat history ==
The Type 92 was used extensively by the Imperial Japanese Army and collaborationist Chinese forces. Captured weapons were also used by Chinese troops against the Japanese during World War II, the Korean People's Army against the United Nations forces during the Korean War, the Viet Minh against the CEFEO forces during the First Indochina War, and the Indonesian Army against the Netherlands forces during the Indonesian National Revolution.

== Users ==
- Republic of China
- People's Republic of China
- Indonesia
- Empire of Japan: Used by the IJA and various collaborationist forces.
- North Korea
- South Korea: Used by police
- Manchukuo: intended to replace the Type 3 heavy machine gun but not provided in sufficient numbers
- Philippines: used by Hukbalahap guerillas
- Taiwan
- (North Vietnam) Viet Minh and Viet Cong
- West Papua National Liberation Army

== See also ==
- Type 1 heavy machine gun

== Gallery ==
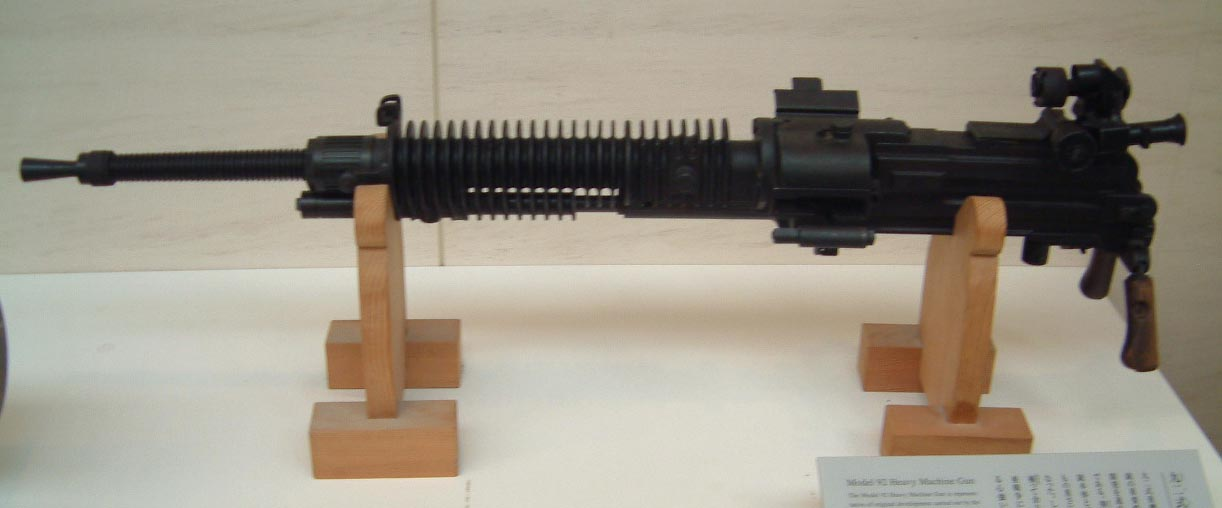
Type 92 heavy machine gun at the Yasukuni Shrine in Tokyo.

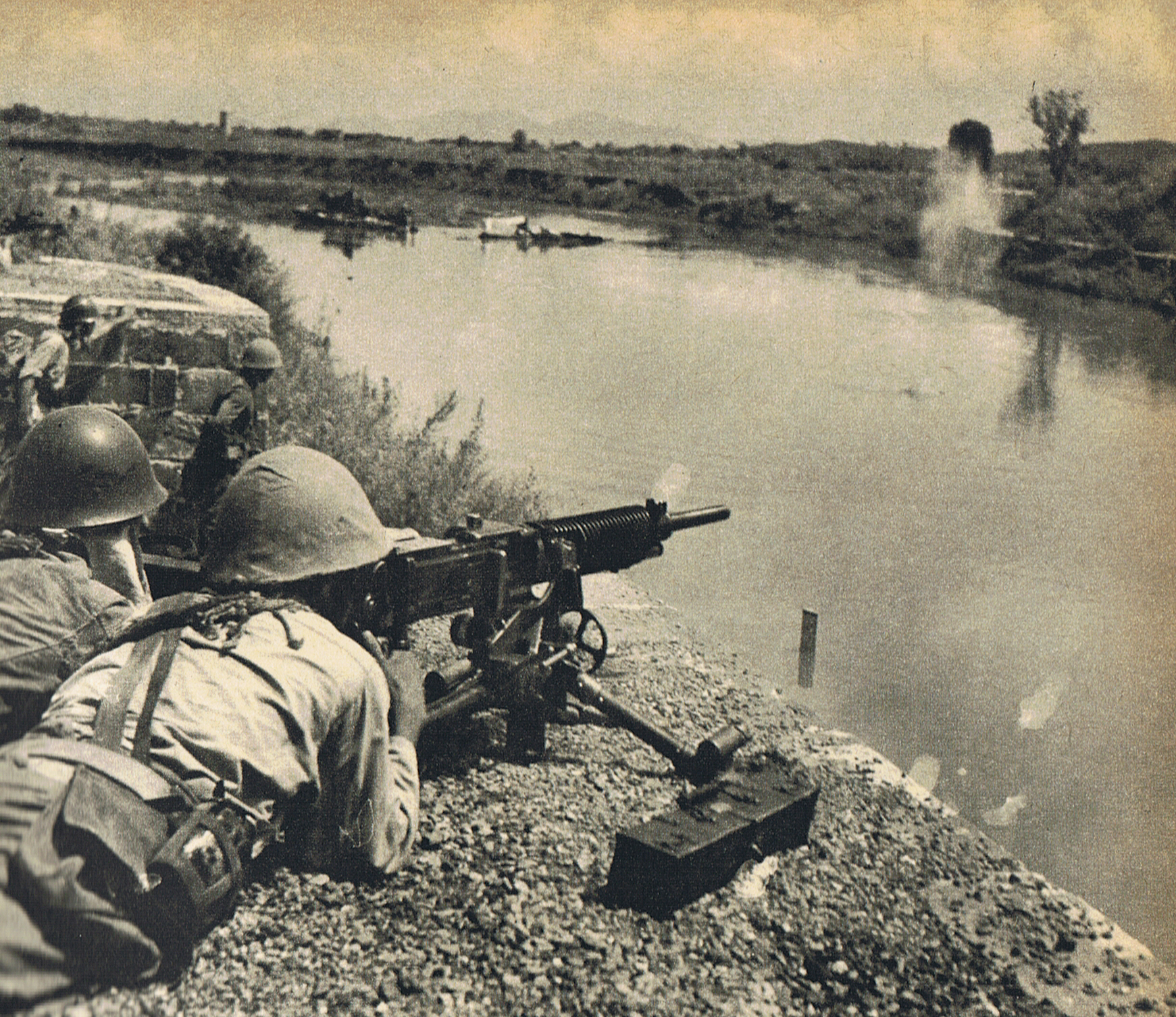
In use during Battle of Changsha (1941).

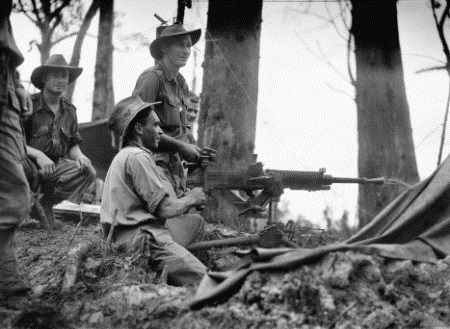
Australian soldiers using a captured Type 92 machine gun.

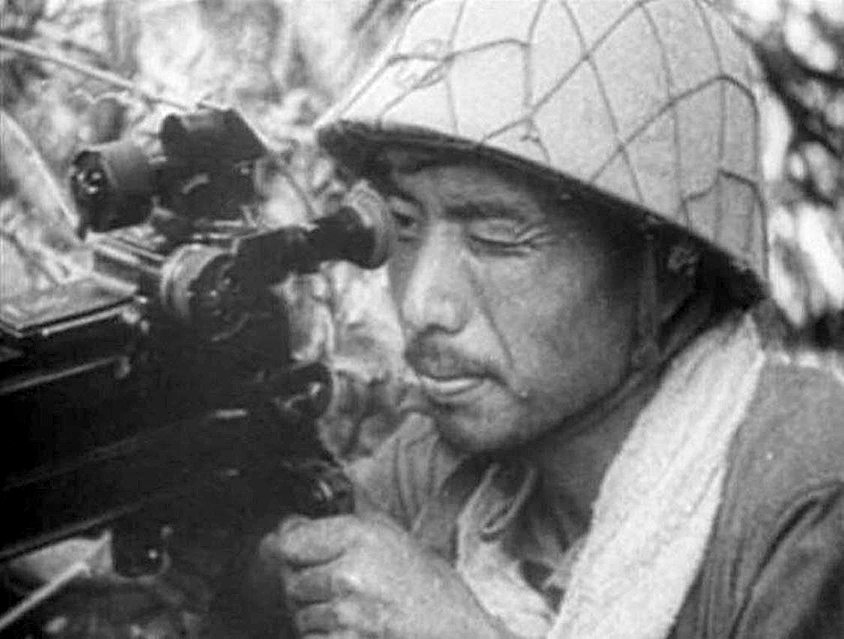
A Japanese soldier aiming at a target through the telescopic sight of his Type 92 heavy machine gun during the Guadalcanal Campaign in 1942.

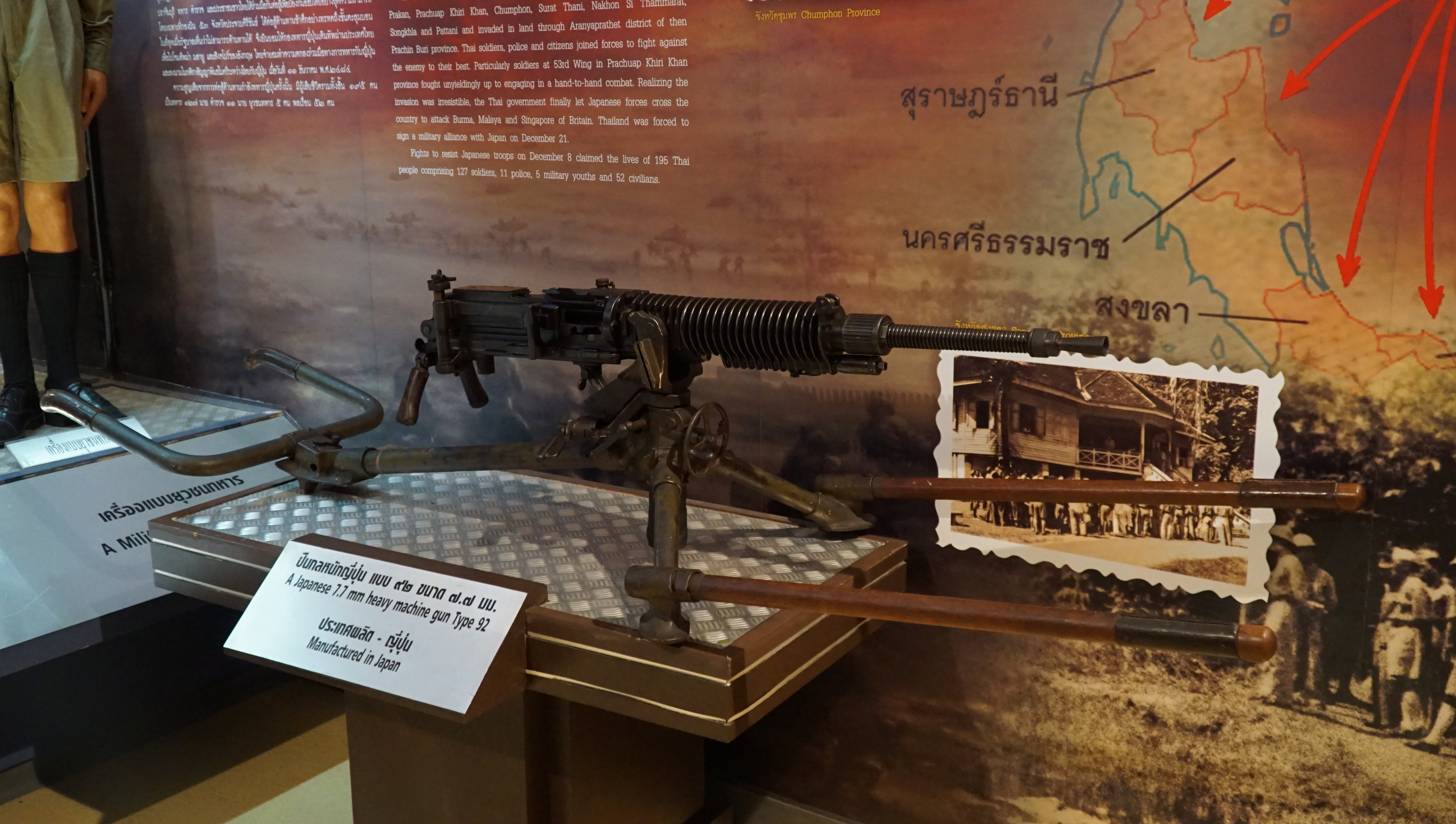
Type 92 heavy machine gun at the National Memorial in Bangkok.

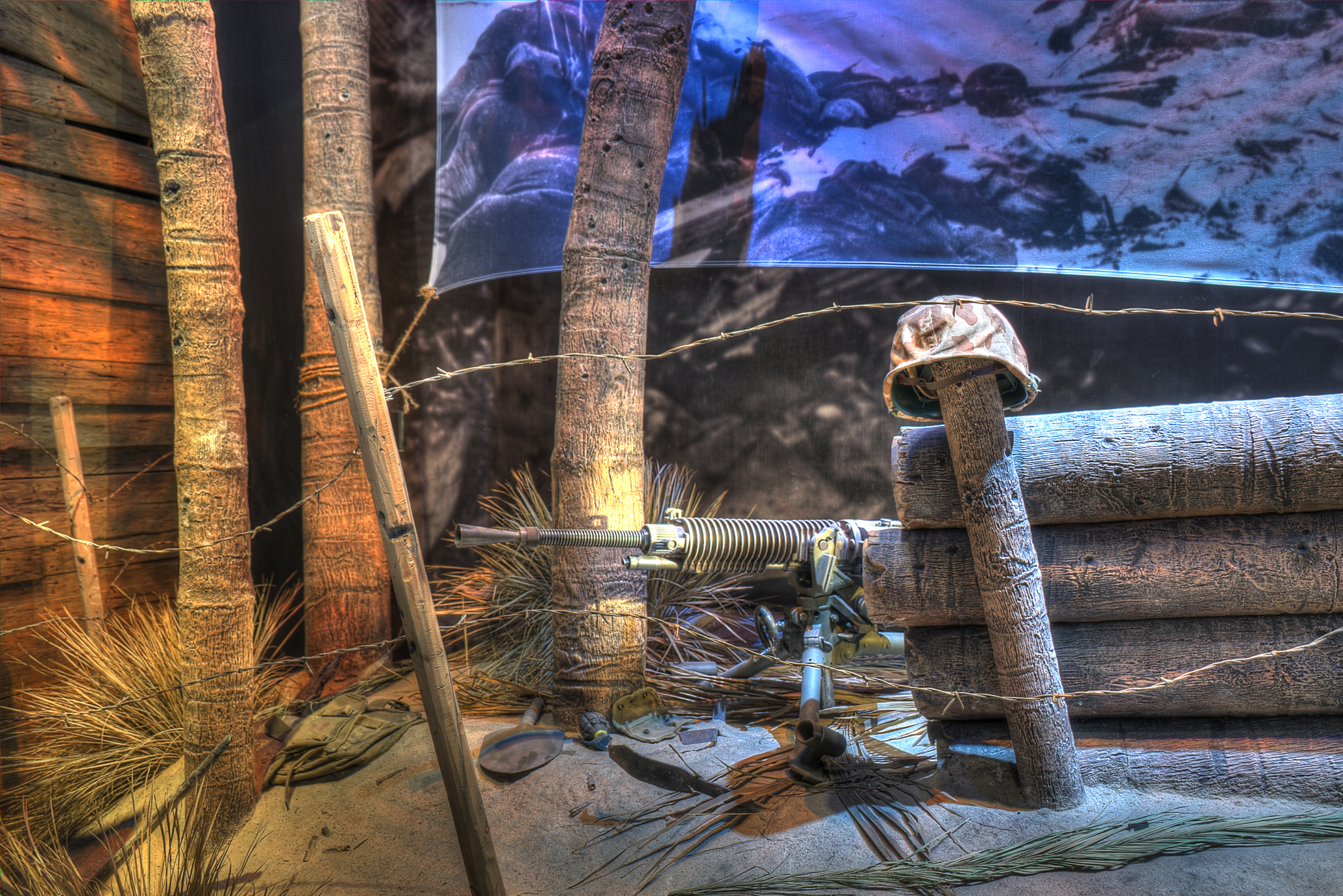
Type 92 machine gun on display at The National WWII Museum in New Orleans.
