= Samochód pancerny wz. 34 =

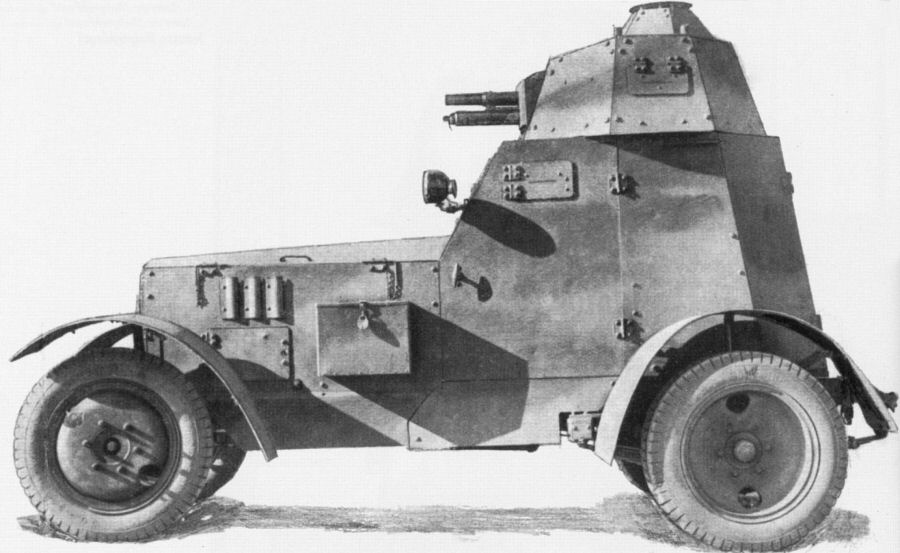
- wz. 34 left side
- Type: Armored car
- Place of origin: Poland

Service history
- Wars: World War II

Production history
- Designed: 1928
- Produced: 1934-1938

Specifications
- Mass: 2.2 t
- Length: 3.62 m
- Width: 1.91 m
- Height: 2.20 m
- Crew: 2
- Armor: 6-8 mm
- Main armament: 7.92 mm wz. 25 Hotchkiss machine gun or 37 mm SA-18 Puteaux gun
- Engine: gasoline 20 hp
- Suspension: wheels
- Operational range: 250 km
- Maximum speed: 54 km/h

Samochód pancerny wz. 34 ("armored car, year 1934 model"), was a standard light armored car used by the Polish Army during the September Campaign of 1939.

== Design ==
The vehicle was based on the earlier half-track samochód pancerny wz. 28, which entered service in 1928. The original vehicle proved to be unpopular with its crews who were unhappy with its handling, low maximum speed, as well as poor cross-country capabilities, and it was decided to rebuild it as a wheeled vehicle. The tracks were replaced by the rear axle from Fiat trucks.

The cars were built in a number of versions with different engines and slightly different armored plates. They were armed with either 7.92 mm Ckm wz. 25 Hotchkiss machine gun or the short-barreled 37 mm Puteaux SA 18 gun. Production ended in 1938.

=== Versions ===
- Wz. 34: original version.
- Wz. 34-I: version with a 23 hp engine.
- Wz 34-II: version with a 25 hp engine and other improvements. Most produced version.

== Service ==
The new version of the armored car was accepted for service in 1935. By 1939, at the outbreak of the Second World War, the car was obsolete but was still in use. All Polish cavalry brigades had organic armored company made of 8 armored cars and 13 tankettes. In 10 out of 11 Polish cavalry brigades, the very armored car, wz.34, had been used. They saw action against both the Germans and the Soviets.

Some wz. 34 captured by the Germans were handed over to the Independent State of Croatia.
