= Type 3 heavy machine gun =

Type 3 machine gun
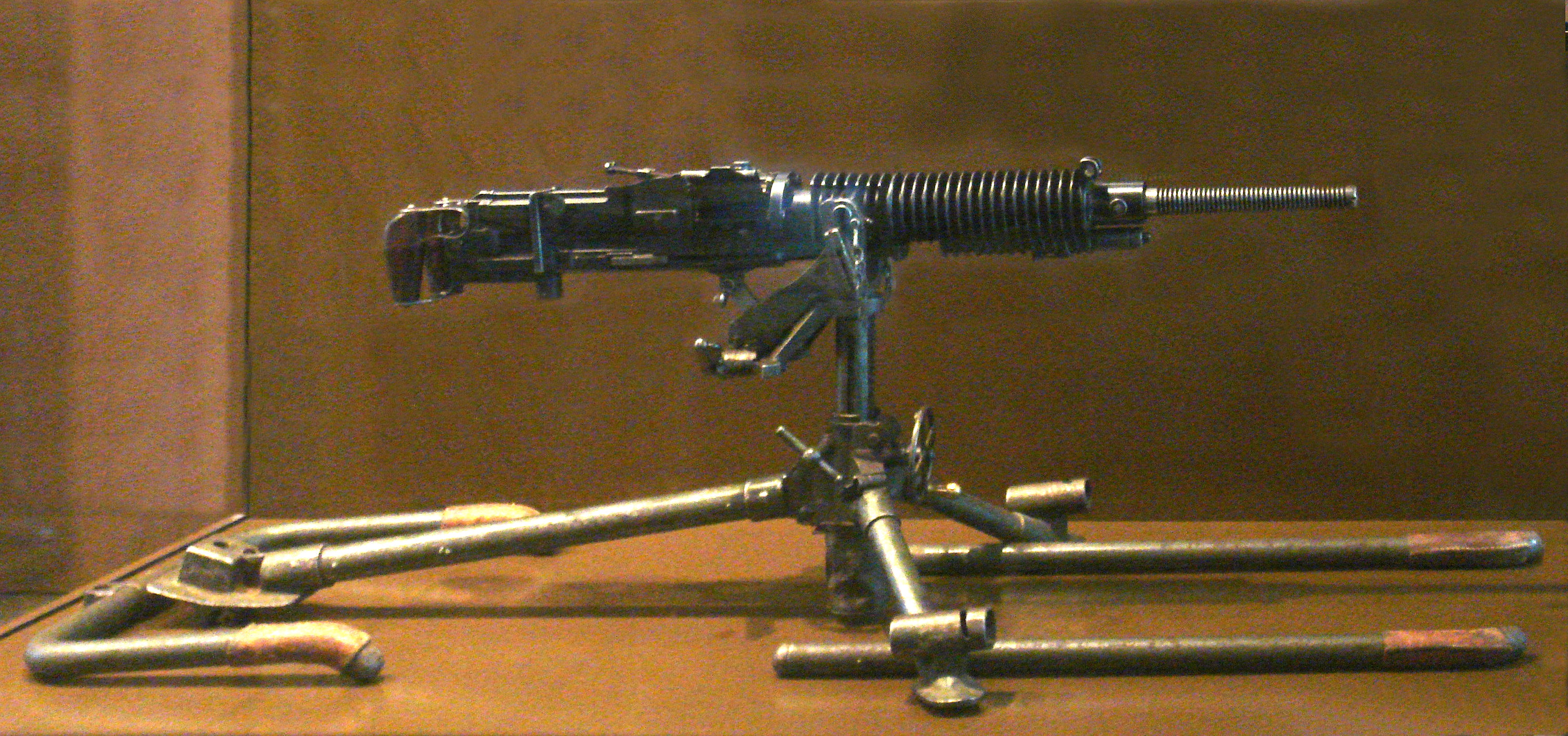
- Type 3 (Taishō 14) heavy machine gun
- Type: Heavy machine gun
- Place of origin: Empire of Japan

Service history
- In service: 1914–1945 (Japan)
- Used by: See § Users
- Wars: List of conflicts: Russo-Japanese War (Hotchkiss M^{le} 1897); World War I (Type 38 HMG); Japanese Siberian Intervention; Warlord Era; 2^{nd} Sino-Japanese War; Soviet–Japanese border conflicts; World War II; First Indochina War; Korean War; Vietnam War

Production history
- Designer: Kijiro Nambu
- Designed: 1914
- Produced: 1914–1932
- Variants: Modelo 1920

Specifications
- Mass: 55 kg (121.25 lb)
- Length: 1,198 mm (47.17 in)
- Barrel length: 737 mm (29.02 in)
- Cartridge: 6.5×50mmSR Arisaka; 7×57mm Mauser
- Action: Gas-actuated
- Rate of fire: 400–450 rounds/min
- Muzzle velocity: 740 m/s (2,400 ft/s)
- Maximum firing range: 4,000 m (4,400 yd)
- Feed system: 30-round Hotchkiss-style feed strip

The Type 3 heavy machine gun (三年式重機関銃, San-nen-shiki juu-kikanjuu), also known as the Taishō 14 machine gun, was a Japanese air-cooled heavy machine gun. The Type 3 heavy machine gun was in a long-line of Japanese Hotchkiss machine gun variants that the Imperial Japanese Army would utilize from 1901 to 1945.

== History ==
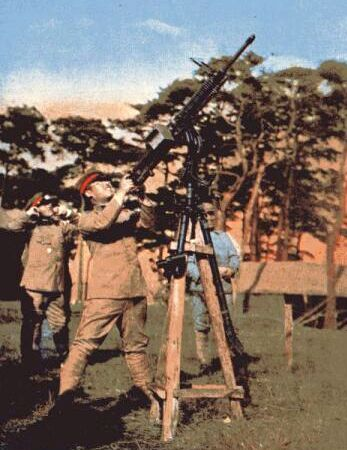
A Type 3 on a makeshift anti-aerial tripod

Starting in 1901, Japan began importing Hotchkiss M^{le} 1897 heavy machine guns that were compatible with the 6.5mm Arisaka cartridges. Japan eventually bought a license for domestic production, with the type seeing notable service during the Russo-Japanese War.

Japanese gun designer Kijirō Nambu would later modify the domestic Hotchkiss M^{le} 1897 heavy machine gun to better meet Japanese requirements, to include lessons learned following the conclusion of the Russo-Japanese War. This effort would result in the adoption of the domestic Type 38 heavy machine gun in 1907. The Type 38 heavy machine gun would first see action in Qingdao, China during World War I. The Type 38 heavy machine gun was still in service at the time of the Marco Polo Bridge incident in 1937.

Kijirō Nambu would further modify the Type 38 heavy machine gun in 1909, focusing on improving dissipation and durability. This would result in the Type 3 heavy machine gun, entering service in 1914 and first seeing action in the Japanese intervention in Siberia in 1919. During the 1930s, the Type 3 heavy machine gun would see wide-scale use in Manchuria and China during the Second Sino-Japanese War. The Type 3 tripod could be used as an anti-aircraft mounting, and special anti-aircraft sights were provided.

== Users ==
- Chile: Chile bought several hundred Type 3 machine guns in 7×57mm Mauser as Modelo 1920. Barrels were manufactured in France by Hotchkiss but most of the weapon was made at the Koishikawa Arsenal.
- China: Purchased for Chang Tso-lin's Fengtian Army. Later used by the Collaborationist Chinese Army
- Empire of Japan
- Manchukuo
- North Korea: It was used by the Korean People's Army during the Korean War.
- North Vietnam

== Gallery ==
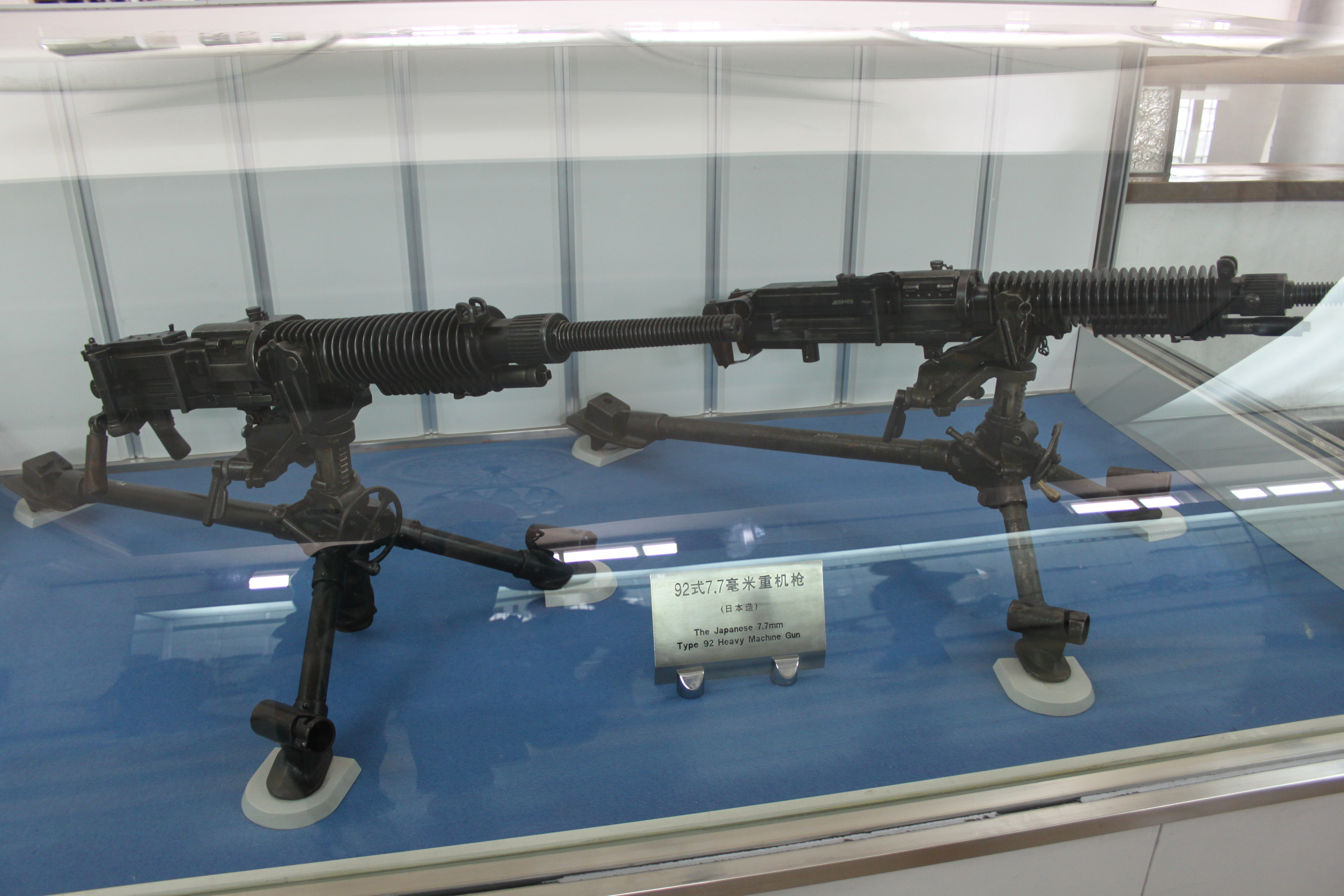
A Type 3 and Type 92 next to each other at a Beijing museum, showing the similarity

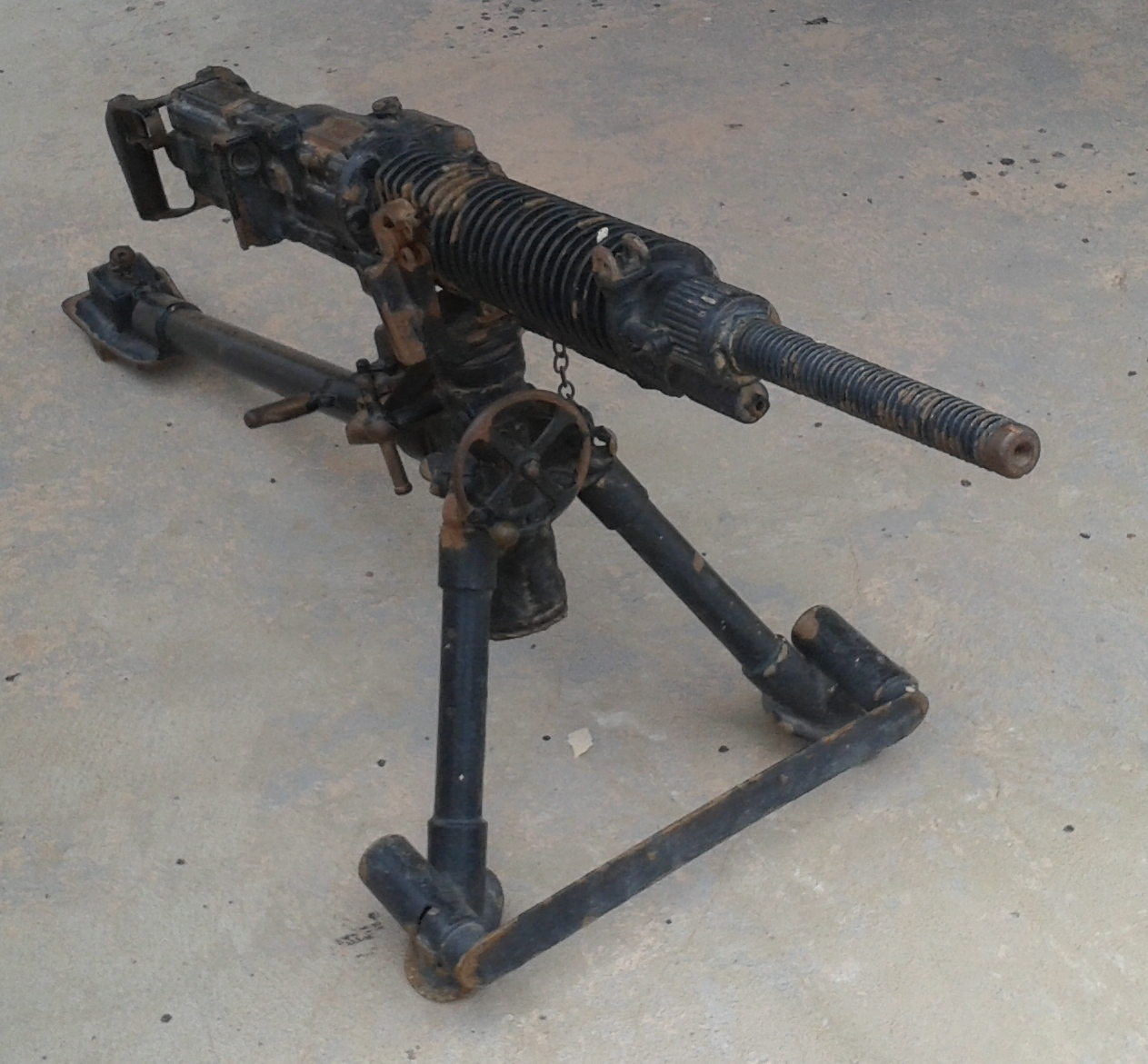
A 7-mm export gun in a Chilean museum

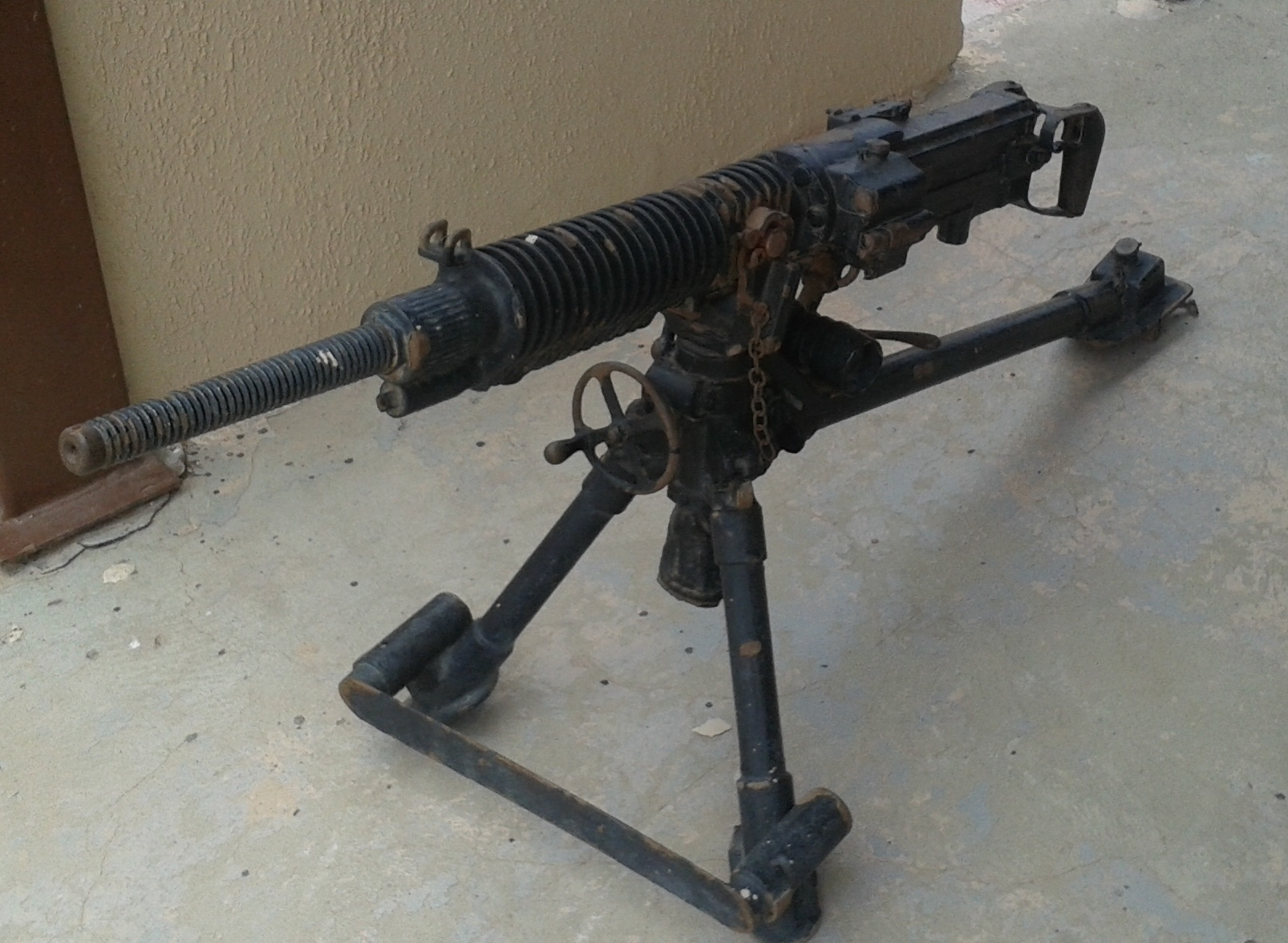
Ditto

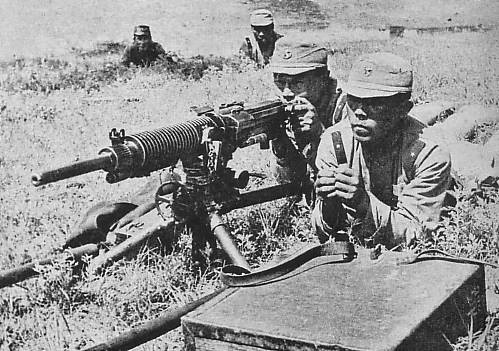
In service with the Manchukuo Imperial Army

== See also ==
- Type 92 heavy machine gun
- Type 1 heavy machine gun

== Bibliography ==
- McNab, Chris (2004). Twentieth-century Small Arms. Grange Books. p. 186. ISBN 1-84013-381-3.
