= Ciężki karabin maszynowy wz. 25 =

Polish heavy machine gun

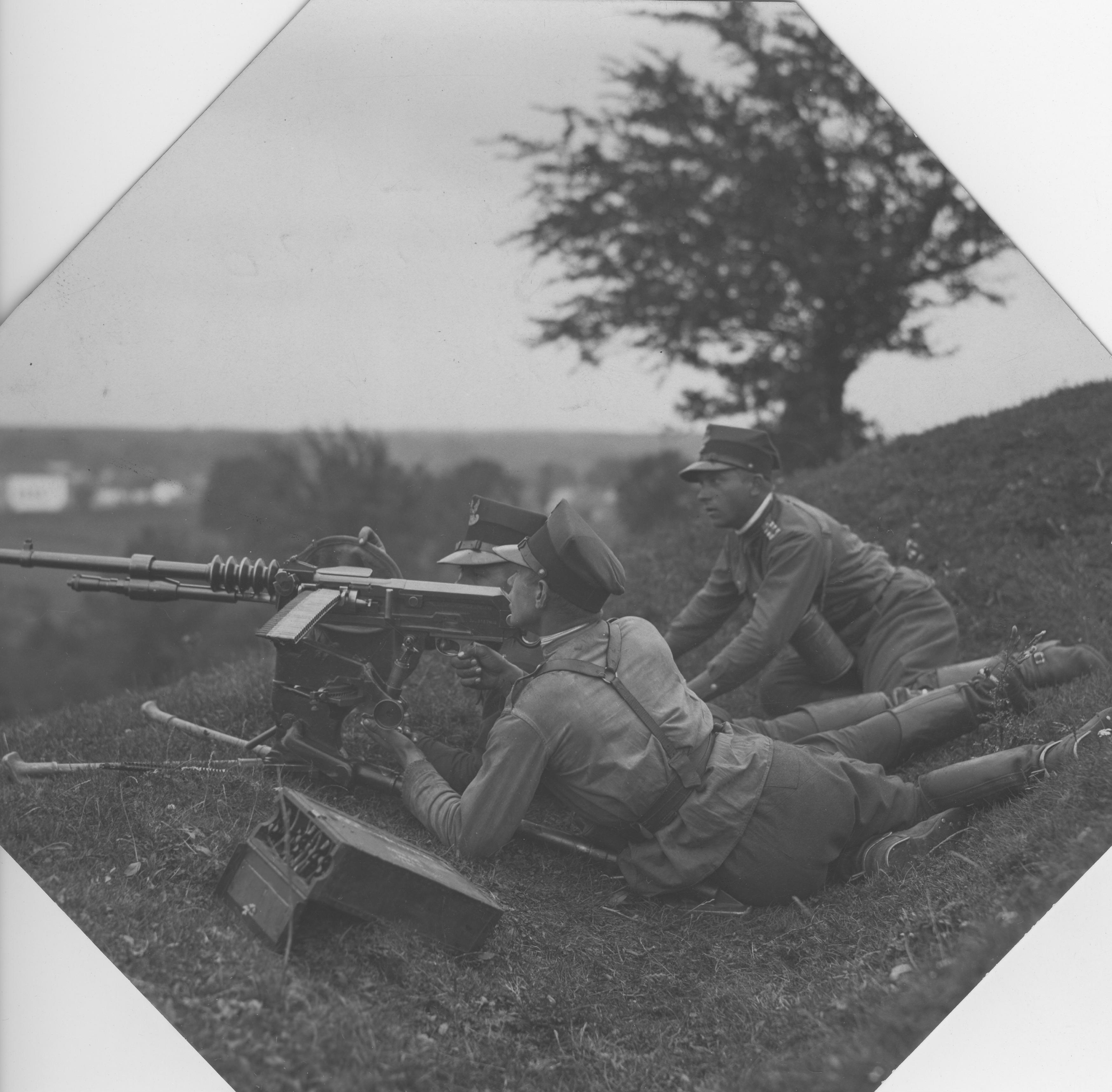
- A ckm wz. 25 machine gun crew during exercise, 1931
- Type: Heavy machine gun
- Place of origin: France

Service history
- In service: 1926–1939
- Used by: Poland; Nazi Germany (captured)
- Wars: Polish Campaign

Production history
- No. built: 1249

Specifications
- Cartridge: 7.92×57mm Mauser
- Action: gas-actuated
- Rate of fire: 450–600 round/min
- Feed system: 30 round strip

The ckm wz. 25 (military acronym for ciężki karabin maszynowy wzór 25, "heavy machine gun pattern 1925") was a Polish derivative of the Hotchkiss M1914 machine gun, rechambered for 7.92×57mm Mauser ammunition.

== Design ==
This Polish modification of the Hotchkiss Mle.1914 was designed in late 1924 and speedily pressed into service with the Polish Army. At least 1249 were bought in France, and subsequently used in the Polish Army since 1926.

It was not a successful design, though. Due to a higher velocity of a stronger ammunition, the barrel was warming up quickly, which caused too much barrel wear and, as a result, deterioration of accuracy. The ckm wz. 25 had a tendency to jam, and damages of some parts were more frequent, than in the earlier wz. 14, especially susceptible was the firing pin. As a result, the wz. 25 was withdrawn from infantry service and relegated to Border Defence Corps and artillery units. Some weapons were further modified in the 1930s and used as the main machine gun in Polish armoured cars. Feeding was provided by a standard 30-round metal feed strip.

Some Polish ckm wz. 25 guns were captured by the Wehrmacht during the German and Soviet invasion of Poland of 1939 and pressed into German service as 7,9 mm sMG 238(p).
