= Belt (firearms) =

Feeding mechanism for a firearm

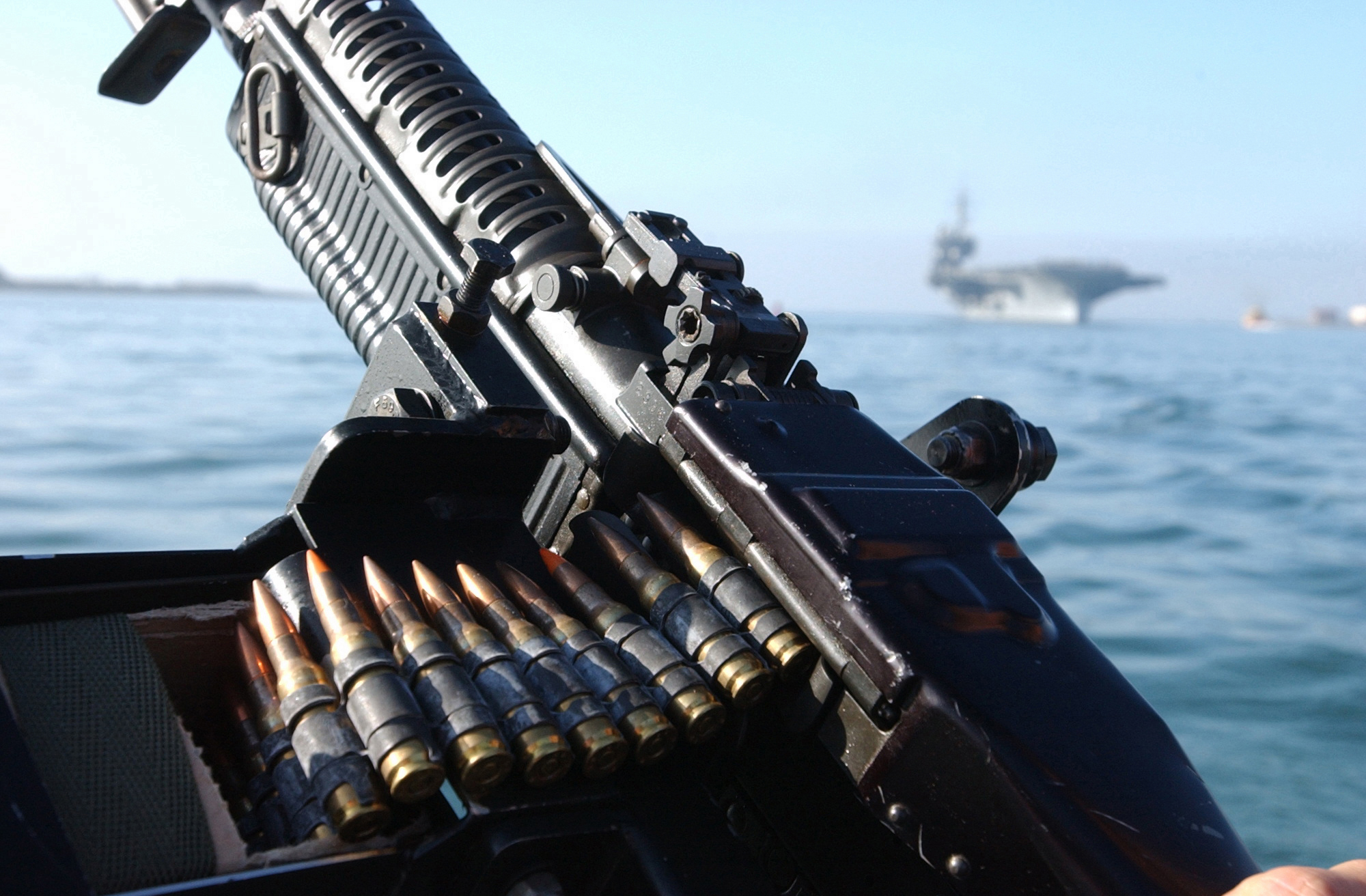
An M60 machine gun belt loaded with 7.62×51mm NATO cartridges, aboard a U.S. Navy patrol craft

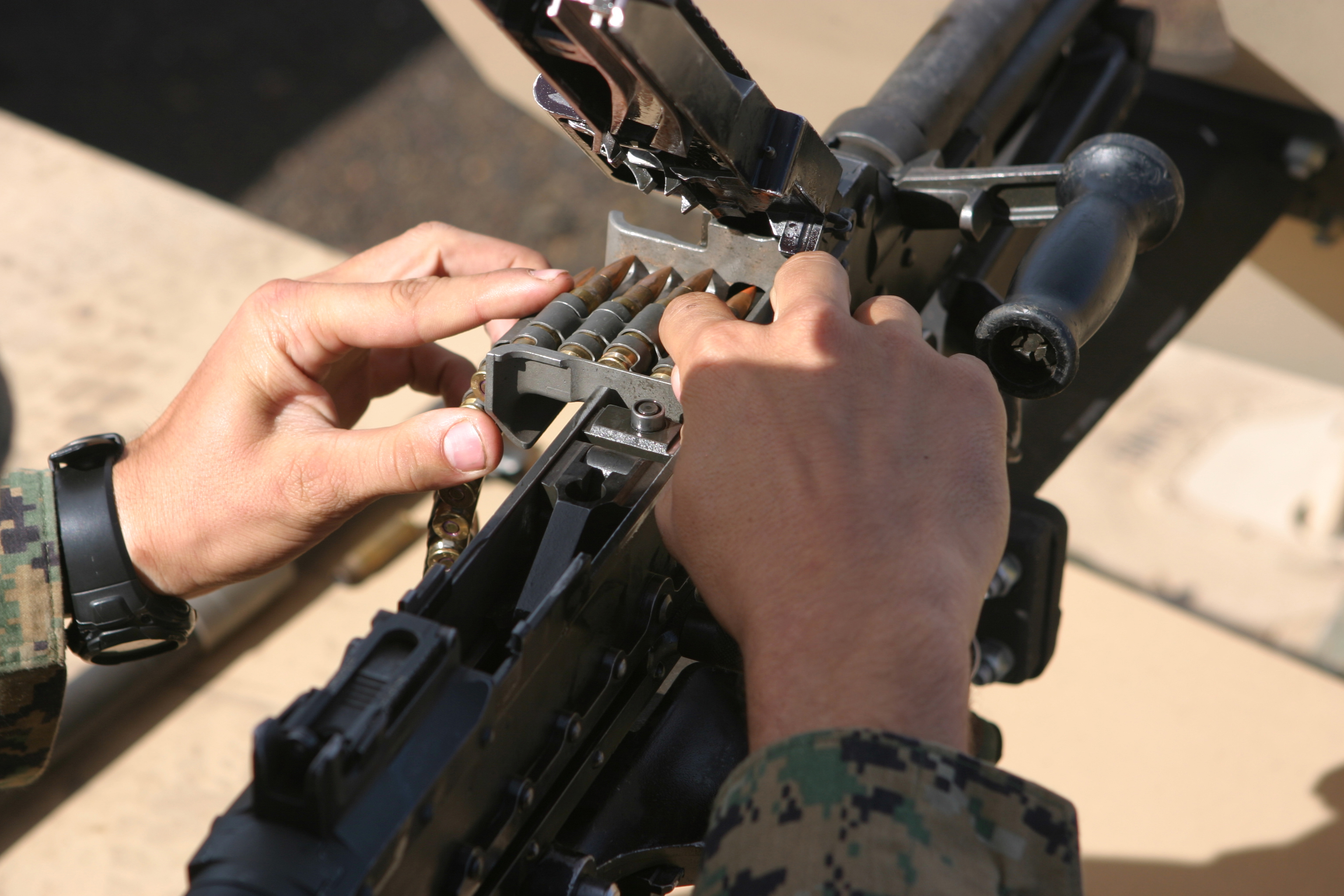
A US Marine inserts an ammunition belt connected by M13 links into the feed tray of the M240G general-purpose machine gun

An ammunition belt is a firearm device used to package and feed cartridges, typically for rapid-firing automatic weapons such as machine guns. Belt-fed systems minimize the proportional weight of the ammunition apparatus to the entire weapon system, allowing high rates of continuous fire without needing frequent magazine changes. The capacity of belts and associated belt containers is typically a function of weight and bulk, and their size is limited by caliber and the combined portability of the weapon and ammunition. Typical capacities for man-portable weapon systems range from 50 to 300 rounds of ammunition.

== Variants ==
=== Feed strip ===
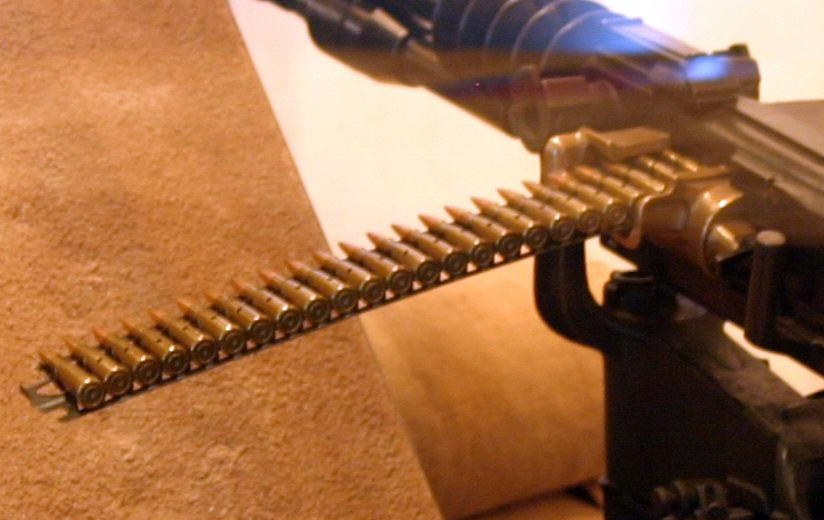
8mm Lebel feed strip on an M1914 Hotchkiss gun.

The "feed strip" (also referred to as an "ammo strip" or "feed tray") was initially designed in 1895, based on initial designs by Captain Baron Adolf Odkolek von Ujezda of Vienna, Austria. A feed strip is a simple rigid metal (usually steel or brass) tray, typically holding 15 to 30 cartridges that are crimped together into a row. The feed strip is loaded into the side of the gun and as the cartridges are stripped off and fired from the weapon, the tray gradually moves to the other side until it falls out when it is empty, whereupon a new one is inserted. In this regard, it is similar to an en-bloc clip. The "feed strip" loading system was pioneered by the Hotchkiss machine gun designs, most notably the Hotchkiss M1914 machine gun. The Hotchkiss guns were used by major militaries such as the United States, the United Kingdom and the French throughout the duration of the First World War and slightly afterwards. However, the feed strip mechanisms lived on through other militaries, most notably the Italian-designed Breda M37 and the Japanese-designed Type 3 and Type 92 machine guns, which were used up until the end of the Second World War.

=== Articulated feed belt ===
Though feed strips were replaced by most militaries with machine guns using either disintegrating or non-disintegrating belts and detachable magazines, the Hotchkiss feed strip design pioneered an early 50-round articulated belt-fed mechanism made up of articulated pieces of metal that folded together, resembling conventional feed strips; this feed device has only been used with the Hotchkiss M1914 machine gun. The articulated Hotchkiss belt design dates back to 1896.

=== Disintegrating belt ===
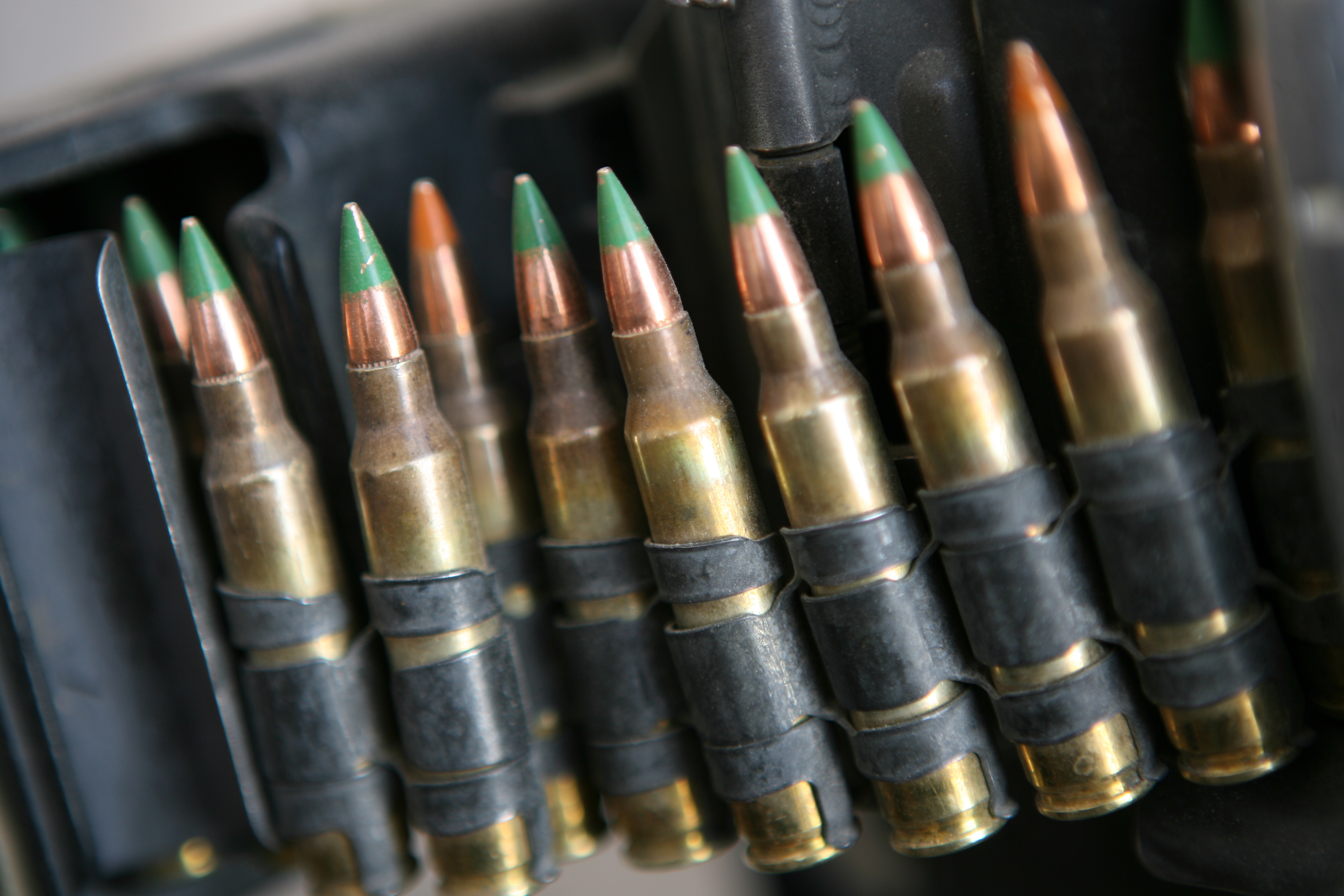
An M27 disintegrating belt loaded with 5.56×45mm NATO M855 Ball and M856 tracer ammunition being fed into an M249 light machine gun

Many modern ammunition belts use disintegrating links. A disintegrating link retains a single round and is articulated with the round ahead of it in the belt. When the round ahead is stripped from the belt and fed into the feed system or chamber, the link holding it is ejected and the link holding the following round is disarticulated. Many disintegrating belt designs allow two pieces of belt to be connected by a cartridge, which can be applied even to non-disintegrating belts. When done by an assistant gunner in combat, linking a new belt to the end of the belt already being fed in the weapon allows for continuous fire without the need to open the feed tray and reload. An example disintegrating belt is the M13 link.

=== Non-disintegrating belt ===
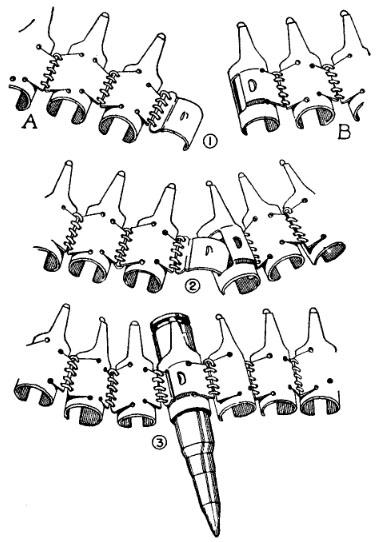
Method of joining German non-disintegrating metallic-link ammunition machine-gun belts

This type of belt consists of a design that can be reused, as it does not fall apart during function, similar to a feed strip. This is found only on a few types of machine guns still in use, such as the Soviet DShK, RPD, PK, the Russian RPL-20, PKP Pecheneg, the German MG 34, MG 42, MG 3, Chinese QJY-88, and the British Vickers, which used a non-disintegrating canvas and brass belt links. Arguably, precursors to the belt-fed machine gun were the Cass rifle, patented in 1848, and the Treeby chain gun, patented in the 1850s.

Belts were originally composed of canvas with pockets spaced evenly to allow the belt to be mechanically fed into the gun. These designs were prone to malfunctions due to the effects of oil, grease, and other contaminants altering the shape of the belt. If they became saturated with water, canvas belts including the loops holding the cartridges would contract, and the gun mechanism would be unable to extract the rounds. Later belt designs used permanently connected metal links to hold the cartridges, and weapons which originally used canvas belts such as the Vickers Gun were then deployed with these more dependable formats. These belts were more tolerant to exposure to solvents and oil. Despite it being a more efficient system, few are still used, possibly due to the added cost and effort.

Non-disintegrating belts often come in pieces of limited length connected by disintegrating links, and after being fed through the weapon the piece falls off, limiting the length of the used belt hanging from the weapon to no more than one such piece. Many weapons designed to use non-disintegrating metal links or canvas belts are provided with machines to automatically reload these belts with loose rounds or rounds held in stripper clips. In use during World War I, reloaders allowed ammunition belts to be recycled quickly to allow a practical rate of continuous fire.

=== Linkless (chain) feed ===
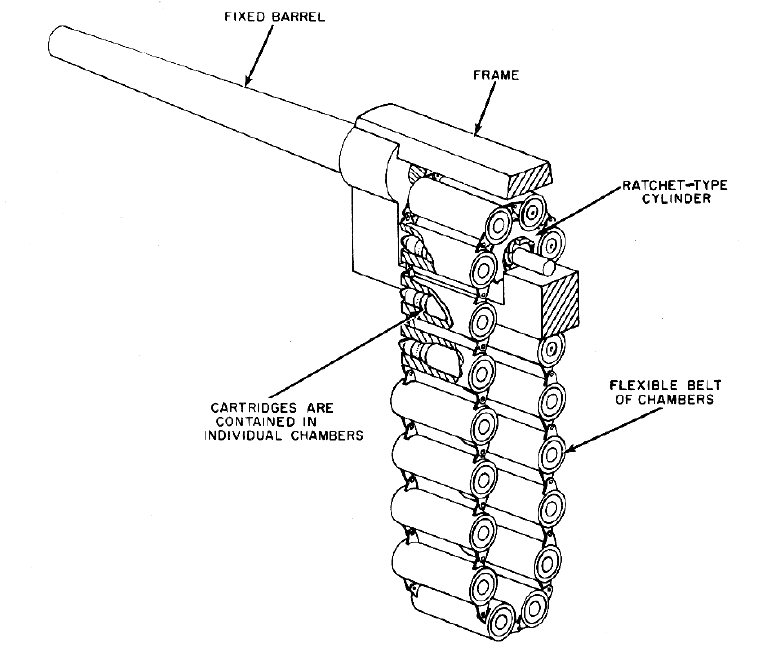
Patent of a "bike chain" gun

A linkless or chain feed is where a chain-like conveyor device is used instead of a belt. Early examples are the Cass rifle, Guyot pistol/rifle, Treeby chain gun. Later examples the ARCO Abider, Marek MSG 3J, Small Arms Ltd. Model 2, Moruzh-2 and the Heckler & Koch LMG 11. Linkless feed systems are mostly found on autocannons.

== Feed variants ==
Schematic of a belt feeder

=== Pull out–push through ===
Most often required by cloth belts, hence found on mostly early machine guns. The pull out–push through cartridge feed system has the cartridge withdrawn from the belt to the rear, then pushed directly forward into the barrel. Examples are the Darne mle 1922, Browning 1919, Browning M2HB, Maxim and Vickers. Among the modern machine guns using this system are the PK family, where its use is favored due to the rimmed 7.62×54mmR cartridge, which makes it more complicated to eject the round forward from the belt (although its not an impossibility, see the UK vz. 59, for an example of a push through GPMG using the same rifle cartridge).

=== Push through ===
Found on mostly modern machine guns. The push through cartridge feed system has the cartridge pushed directly forward into the barrel. Examples are the non-disintegrating Patronengurt 33, 34, or 34/41 used by the MG 34 and MG 42 and the derived Patronengurt DM1 used by the MG 3 whose feeding systems were based on the direct push-through of the cartridge out of the link into the gun's chamber. Accordingly, the link had to be of the half-open type to enable the motion of the bolt through the link. Many modern machine guns use or can use the disintegrating half-open type 7.62×51mm NATO M13 link or 5.56×45mm NATO M27 link.

=== External ===
Some weapons such as the M134 Minigun and related designs use a hybrid mechanism to strip rounds from disintegrating belts into a linkless feed system or a specialized delinker to allow for more reliable feeding at extreme rates of fire. Modern infantry machine guns often have feed systems allowing the use of linked ammunition as well as magazines. In some instances — like the FN Minimi/M249 SAW and the IWI Negev — the feed system requires no modification to fire with either mechanism. Other designs — like the Heckler and Koch HK21-based designs or MG34 — require the exchange of modular parts to allow belt or alternate feeding. Due to the lack of protection provided by the belt, belt-fed infantry weapons typically use a flexible or rigid container to retain the belt on the weapon. In some designs — like the MG3 — the belt container appears to be a magazine, causing some confusion with people unfamiliar with the design.

== Container device ==
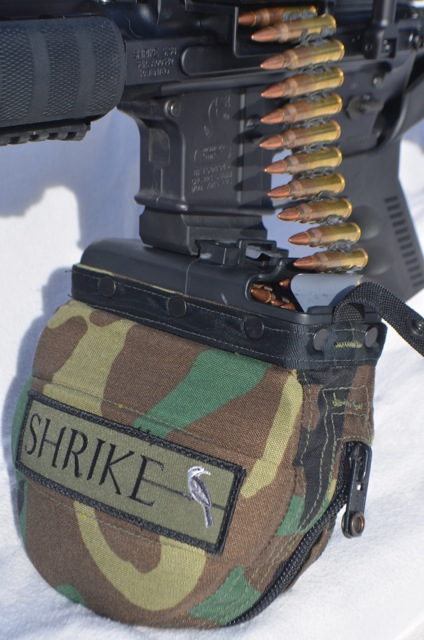
A 200-round M249 ammunition belt pouch attached to an Ares Shrike 5.56 via a magazine well adapter block

Flexible belts tend to hang downward with gravity and randomly whip around with recoil during continuous firing, which can sometimes kink or twist and cause feeding malfunctions. Free-hanging belts can also get dirty or messy with exposure to the elements, be clumsy to handle, and entangle to other objects especially when the shooter tries to maneuver around. To minimize such issues, ammunition belts are sometimes carried in container devices designed to be attached to the firearm either by inserting like a drum magazine or just conveniently mounting to the side (for larger weapon systems). Belt holding containers, often colloquially called "Nutsacks" also hang downward with gravity, and facilitate larger loads to be held by the weapons system

When loading ammunition, one end of the belt is pulled out of an opening on the container and inserted into the gun normally, and the belt progresses out of the container in a controlled fashion. These containers also often have a supporting/guiding bar which enables the belt to enter the weapon at an optimal (more perpendicular) angle, rather than bending down more acutely.

== See also ==
- Bandolier
- Clip
- Magazine
- Stripper clip

=== Notable firearm belts ===
- M1 link
- M13 link
- M27 link
