= Hotchkiss Mle 1914 machine gun =

Hotchkiss M^{le} 1914
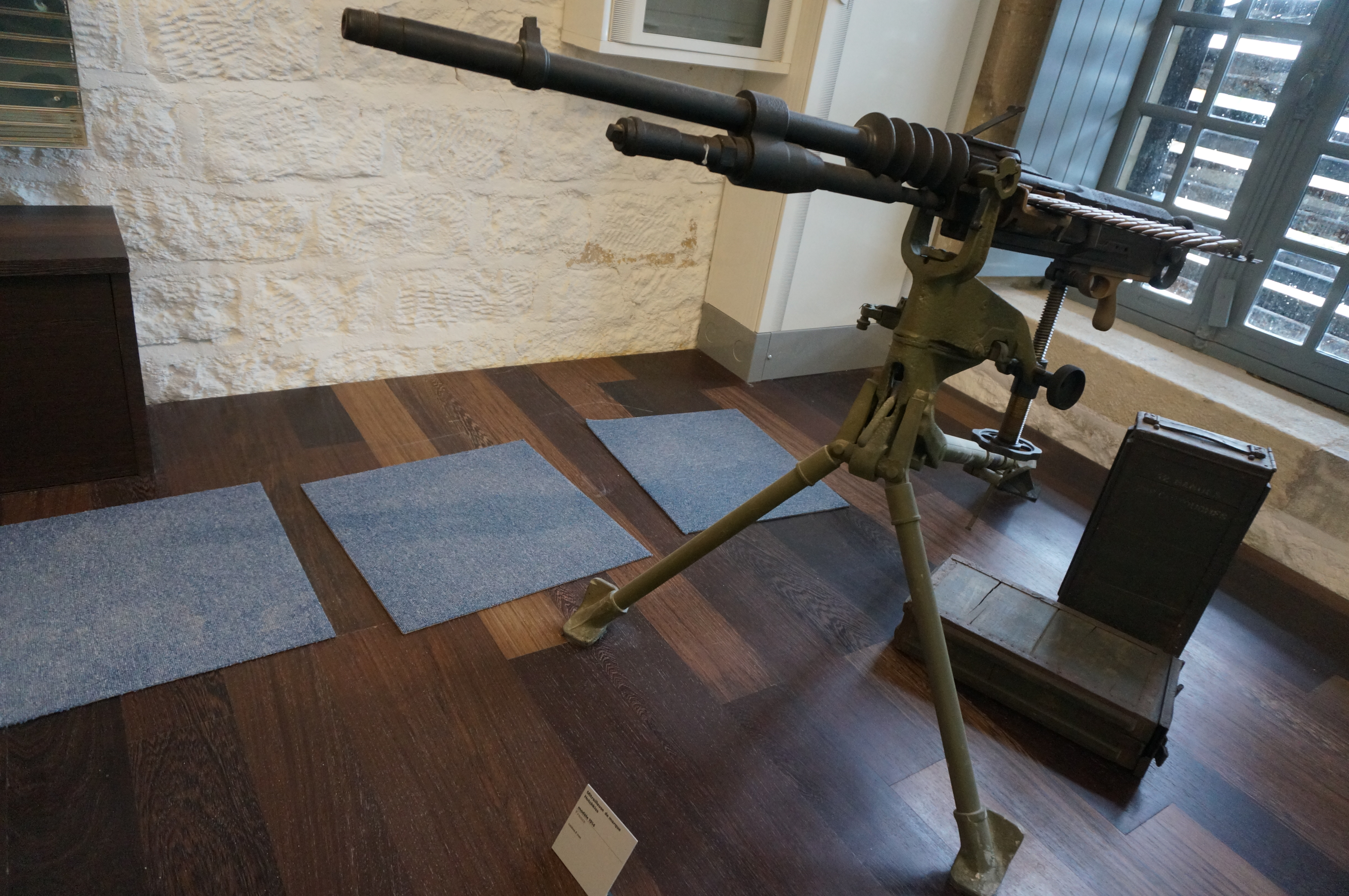
- A Hotchkiss Modèle 1914 machine gun with inserted feed strip at Fort de la Pompelle
- Type: Heavy machine gun
- Place of origin: France

Service history
- In service: 1914–1960s
- Used by: See § Users
- Wars: List of conflicts: Boxer Rebellion (Mle 1897); Russo-Japanese War (Mle 1897); Mexican Revolution; World War I; Warlord Era; Russian Civil War; Polish–Soviet War; Rif War; São Paulo Revolt of 1924; Constitutionalist Revolution; Second Italo-Ethiopian War; Spanish Civil War; Second Sino-Japanese War; World War II; Chinese Civil War; First Indochina War; Algerian War; Ifni War

Production history
- Designer: A. Odkolek von Augeza; Laurence V. Benét; Henri Mercié.
- Designed: 1897 (Mle 1897); 1900 (Mle 1900); 1909 (Mle 1909); 1914 (Mle 1914)
- Produced: 1914–1920 (Mle 1914)
- No. built: Over 65,000
- Variants: See § Variants

Specifications
- Mass: 23.6 kg (52.03 lb)
- Length: 1,270 mm (50 in)
- Barrel length: 770 mm (30.31 in)
- Cartridge: 8×50mmR Lebel Other cartridges: 6.5×50mmSR Arisaka; 6.5×55mm Swedish; 6.5×58mm Vergueiro; 7×57mm Mauser; 7.65×53mm Mauser; 7.92×57mm Mauser; 7.92×61mm Norwegian; 11×59mmR Gras
- Action: Gas-actuated
- Rate of fire: 450–600 rounds/min
- Muzzle velocity: 724 m/s (2,375 ft/s)
- Feed system: 24-round Feed strip; 30-round Feed strip; 249-round Articulated metal belt

The Mitrailleuse Automatique Hotchkiss modèle 1914 (chambered for the 8mm Lebel cartridge) became the standard machine gun of the French Army during the latter half of World War I. It was manufactured by the French arms company Hotchkiss et Cie, which had been established in the 1860s by American industrialist Benjamin B. Hotchkiss. The gas-actuated Hotchkiss system was first formulated in 1893 by Odkolek von Ujezda and improved into its final form by Hotchkiss armament engineers, American Laurence Benét and his French assistant Henri Mercié.

The Mle 1914 was the last version of a series of nearly identical Hotchkiss designs, following the Mle 1897, Mle 1900 and the Mle 1909. The Hotchkiss Mle 1914 became the French infantry standard in late 1917, replacing the unreliable St. Étienne Mle 1907. The American Expeditionary Forces (AEF) in France also purchased 7,000 Mle 1914 Hotchkiss machine guns in 8mm Lebel, and used them extensively at the front in 1917 and 1918. Hotchkiss heavy machine guns, some being of earlier types, were also used in combat by Japan, Chile, Mexico, Spain, Belgium, Brazil, and Poland.

The Hotchkiss machine gun, a sturdy and reliable weapon, remained in active service with the French army until the early 1940s. By the end of 1918, 47,000 Hotchkiss machine guns had already been delivered to the French army alone. Including all international sales, the grand total of all Hotchkiss machine guns sold by the manufacturer in various calibers was well in excess of 100,000 units.

== History and design ==
=== Early models ===
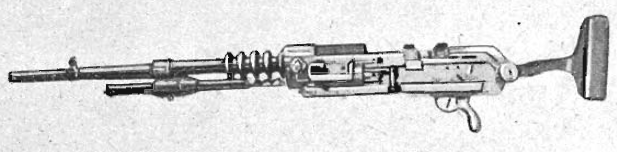
The 1898 version sold to Norway

The Hotchkiss was based on a design by Captain Baron Adolf Odkolek von Újezd of Vienna, first patented in July 1889 with further patents following in the following years, tested in 1893 in Saint-Denis, near Paris. The patents had been purchased in 1894–1895 by the firm of Benjamin Hotchkiss. Benjamin Hotchkiss was no longer alive at the time of the purchase, but the Odkolek design was further developed and greatly improved under the direction of American-born Laurence Vincent Benét, son of General Benét. In 1898 an export model was offered for international sales by Hotchkiss and sold to Brazil, Chile, Japan, Mexico, Norway and Venezuela that year. With some useful changes, such as the addition of five cooling radiator rings on the barrel, the same basic design led to the Mle 1900. The gun was tested in 1901 by two Chasseur battalions and in 1903–1904 with cavalry units. The French Army bought another 50 Hotchkiss machine guns in 1906 for comparative trials but adopted the more complex Puteaux Mle 1905 (upgraded as the St. Étienne Mle 1907) to equip the infantry in 1907–1909. Nevertheless, 600 Mle 1900 machine guns were also purchased by the French military for use in overseas colonies.

=== Model 1914 ===
At the beginning of the World War I, the Manufacture d'armes de Saint-Étienne proved to be unable to produce enough St. Etienne machine guns. The French military forces chose to adopt the Hotchkiss Mle 1900 with some minor modifications, as the Mitrailleuse Automatique modèle 1914. The Hotchkiss gun is initially supplied to second-line troops but in 1916 front-line units began to use the Mle 1914. That year, a parliamentary committee of inquiry concluded that the Hotchkiss was more reliable than the St. Etienne and the production of the latter was stopped.

=== Design ===
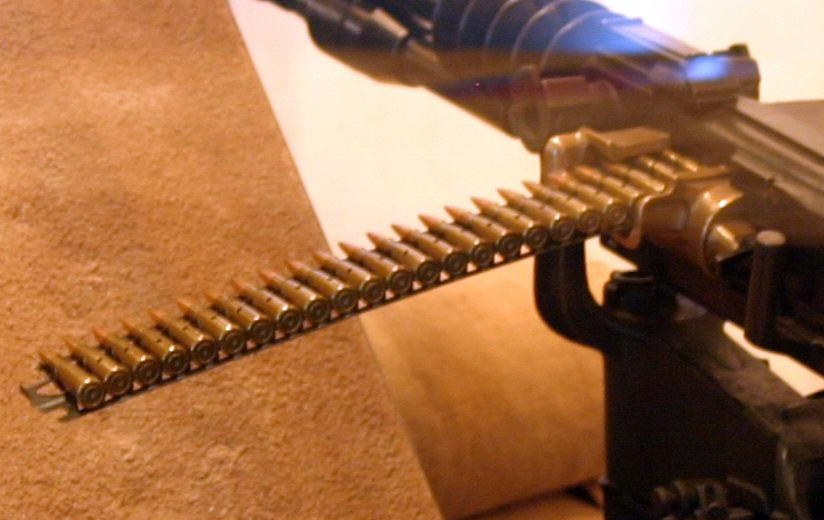
8mm Lebel ammunition in a feed strip

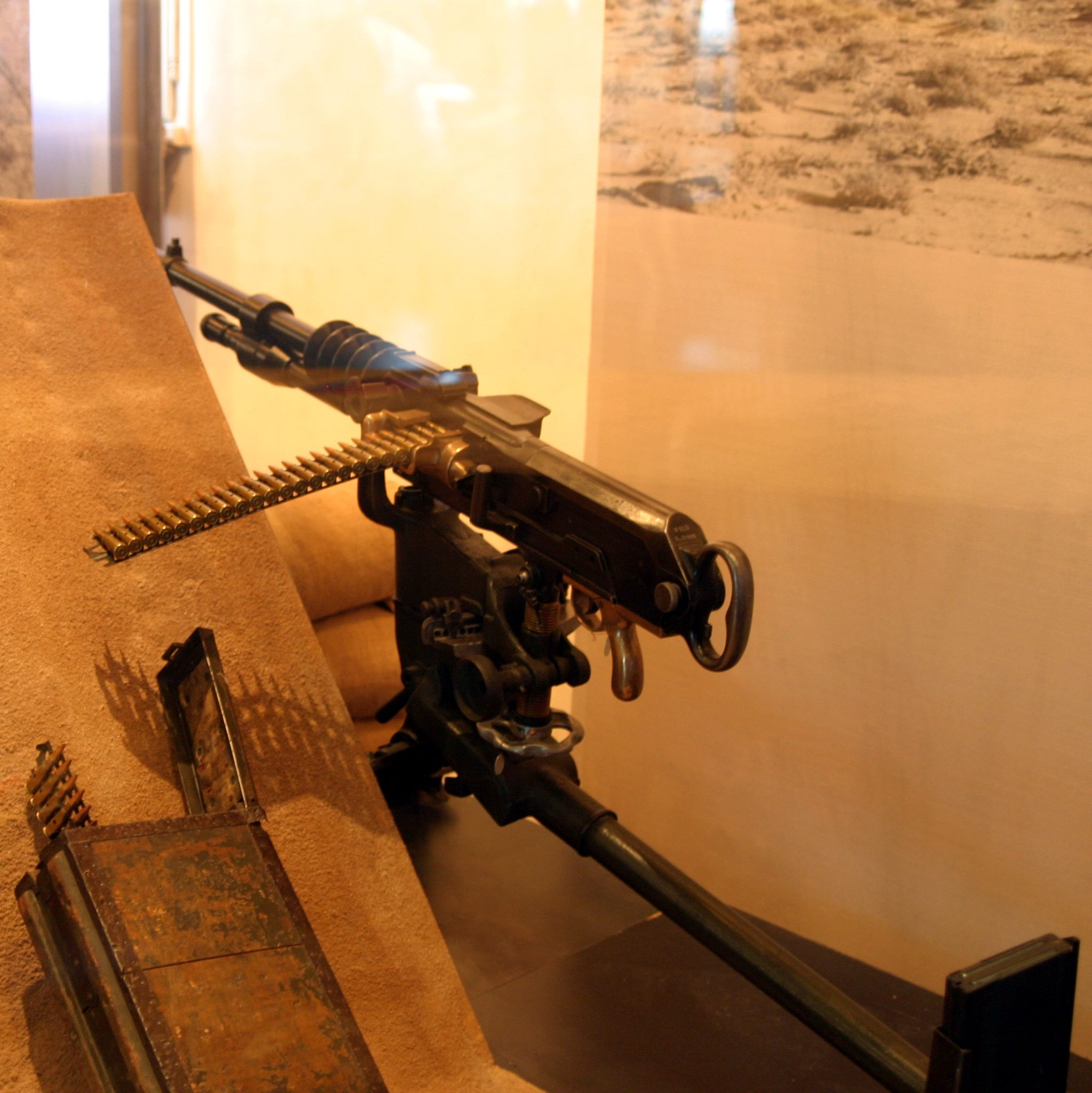
Rear of Hotchkiss Modèle 1914 with inserted feed strip at Musée de l'Armée in Paris

The Hotchkiss machine gun was gas actuated and air-cooled, in contrast to the Maxim gun which was recoil operated and water-cooled. The Hotchkiss machine gun barrel features five large rings which materially assisted natural cooling and retarded overheating. The gas cylinder under the barrel features a regulator piston which can be adjusted to the normal rate of fire of 450 rounds per minute. The Hotchkiss machine gun itself (excluding the tripod) has only 32 parts, including four coil springs, and no screws or pins whatsoever. All parts of the gun are constructed in such a manner that it is impossible to assemble them improperly. The Hotchkiss fired from an open bolt, like almost all modern machine guns, in order to avoid "cook-offs" – cartridges being prematurely ignited by the overheated chamber. Although the Hotchkiss machine gun was easy to feed continuously with a three-man team, each individual strip held only 24 rounds of 8mm Lebel ammunition. This feature proved to be one of the Hotchkiss's shortcomings, as the crew needed to reload the gun several times for every minute of firing, far more often than on every other machine gun of the same period (the Maxim used a 250-round continuous cloth belt). Each empty feed strip was ejected automatically after its last round had been fired, leaving the bolt open in the rear position. Then introducing a new loaded strip into the gun triggered the release forward of the bolt and firing resumed. The Hotchkiss strips performed well with a three-man crew, but their capacity was too small for a single gunner firing from the inside of a tank. This led to the adoption of a 250-round articulated metal belt in 1917. It was widely used in all French tanks of the period and in some military airplanes.

Beginning in 1900, two basic tripod types were used prior to World War I, when the final and most effective third Hotchkiss tripod model (the Mle 1916) became adopted and widely distributed. A tripod that could be used for both the Hotchkiss and the St. Etienne machine guns was issued in 1915, the so-called "Omnibus Tripod". The French Hotchkiss had a rate of fire of approximately 450 rounds per minute of 8 mm Lebel ammunition, and a maximum effective range of 3,800 m (4,150 yd) with the "Balle D" bullet. Fire for effect was usually in successive bursts of 8 to 10 rounds. The gun could sustain continuous firing of about 120 aimed shots per minute almost indefinitely, except for occasional barrel changes (during continuous fire, approximately every 1,000 rounds) which were quick and easy to perform with a special wrench. The barrel could attain a temperature of about 400 °C, at which temperature it would be dark red in color. At this point the barrel dissipated heat as fast as it was generated. This only occurred after long continuous firing in a combat emergency situation. The most common complaint about the Hotchkiss was its weight: the gun and tripod weighed a total of 50 kilograms (110 lb). There were also complaints concerning the tripods, particularly the "Omnibus" tripods, which were perceived as too high above ground and too heavy.

== Service history ==
=== World War I ===
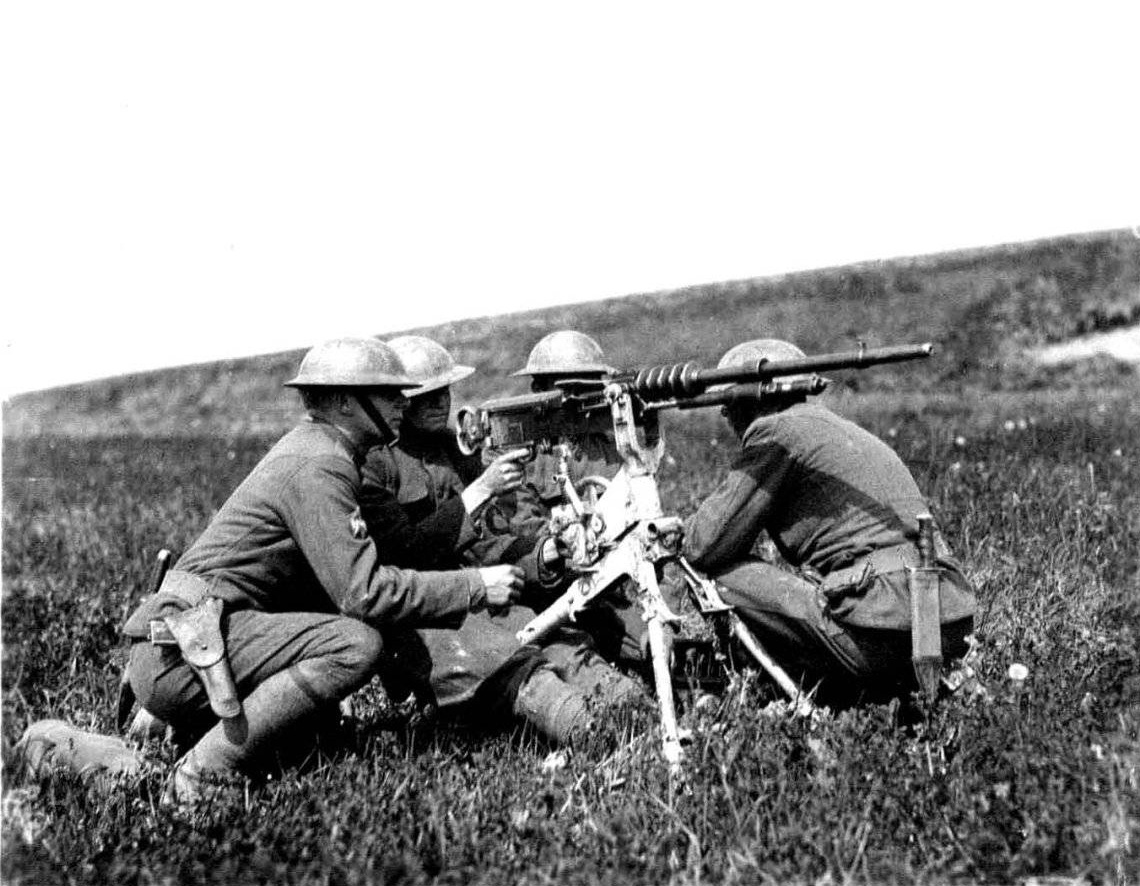
U.S. Army soldiers operating the Mle 1914 Hotchkiss gun in France, 1918.

The principal user of the Mle 1914 Hotchkiss machine gun was the French infantry during World War I and the early days of World War II. The Hotchkiss company delivered 47,000 Mle 1914 machine guns to the French Army between 1914 and the end of 1918. Several hundred were chambered in 11mm Gras for use against enemy balloons, as that was the smallest caliber of incendiary bullet; all other French examples were in 8mm Lebel. The second-largest user of the Hotchkiss was the American Expeditionary Force in France between 1917 and 1918, with the US purchasing and deploying 7,000 Hotchkiss machine guns during the war.

=== Tanks ===
The Hotchkiss Mle. 1914 was also used on numerous French armored vehicles such as the Renault FT, the Char 2C and the White-Laffly armored car.

=== Naval Service ===
The Mle 1914 Hotchkiss was used by the Marine Nationale during the inter-war period, primarily on the twin Mle 1926 mount. It was replaced in service by the Hotchkiss Mle 1929 as it became available. During World War II some of these mountings were returned to service to try and compensate for the slow production of larger and more capable weapons, along with newer 7.5mm machine guns like the Darne.

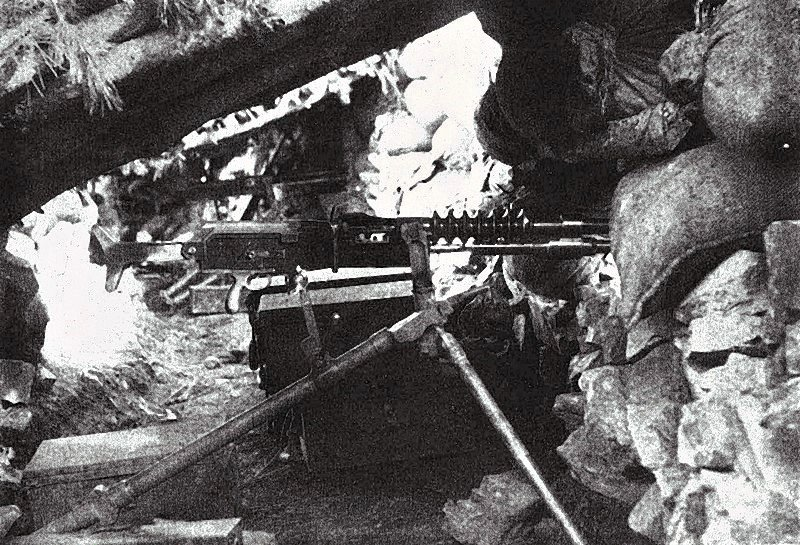
An early Japanese version in 6.5x50mm.

=== Japanese version ===
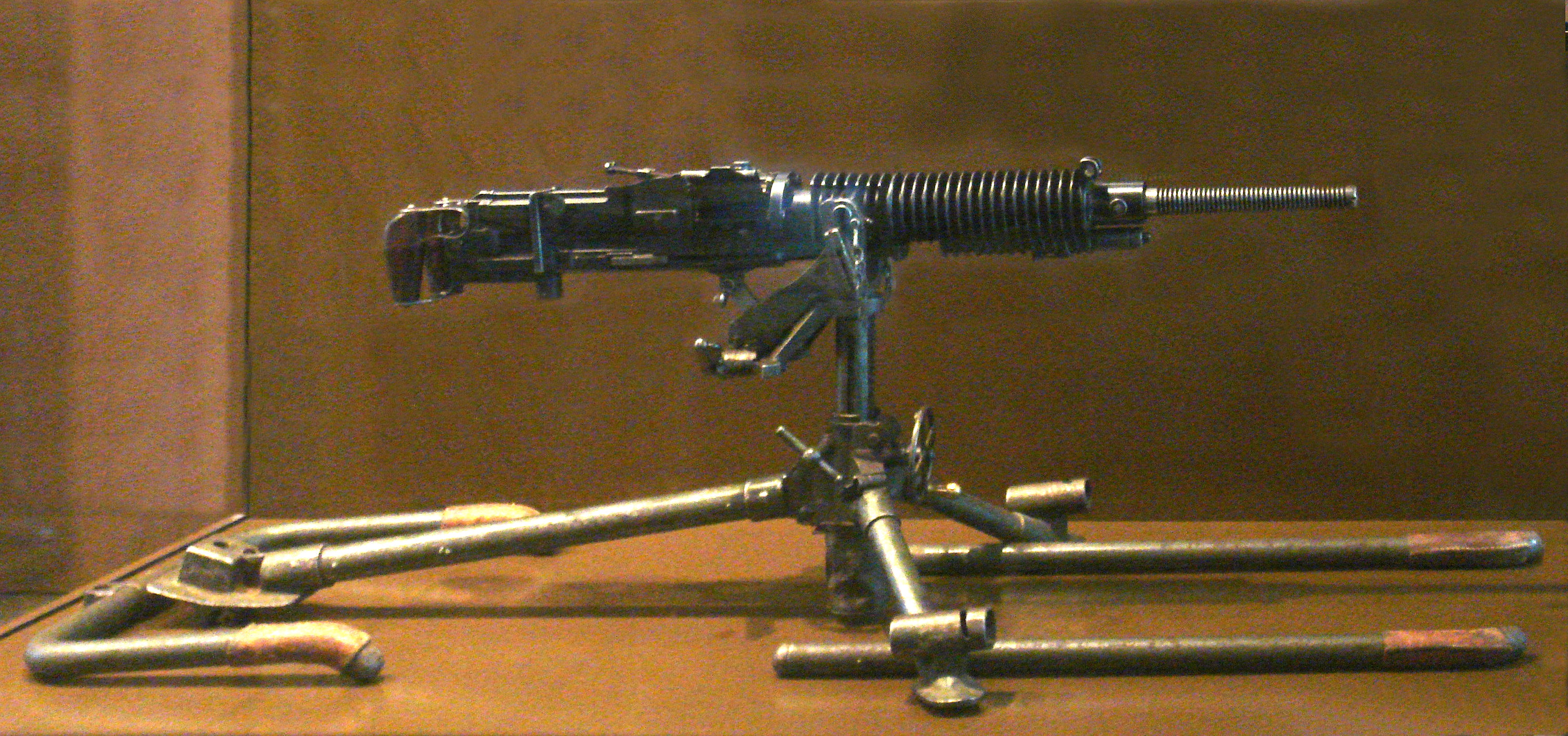
The Japanese licensed version: the Type 3 (Taishō 14) Heavy Machine Gun. Musée de l'Armée, Paris.

During the Boxer Rebellion, Japanese forces acquired a French Mle 1897. Japan acquired a license and began producing Hotchkiss Mle 1897 machine guns in 6.5mm Arisaka. During the Russo-Japanese War, each Japanese division had 24 Hotchkiss machine guns. Being lighter than the Russian Maxims, the Hotchkiss performed well. The production evolved to become the Type 3 Heavy Machine Gun in 1914. The Type 92 Heavy Machine Gun, a scaled-up Type 3 chambered for 7.7mm, was also based on the Hotchkiss design.

=== In China ===
In 1930 to 1935, the Republic of China bought 1,192 Hotchkiss Mle 1914 machine guns from France. The Chinese also copied this gun and used the German 7.92×57mm Mauser. After the Second Sino-Japanese War broke out in 1937, China ordered 1,300 more guns, but only 300 guns were delivered. It was also used during the Chinese Civil War.

=== In Czechoslovakia ===
In 1919–1920, Czechoslovakia bought 855 Mle 1914s from France and received another 89 from the Czechoslovak Legion in France. 985 Hotchkiss Mle 1914 machine guns were in service within the Czechoslovak Army at the end of 1920 and 929 were still recorded in 1938.

=== In Poland ===
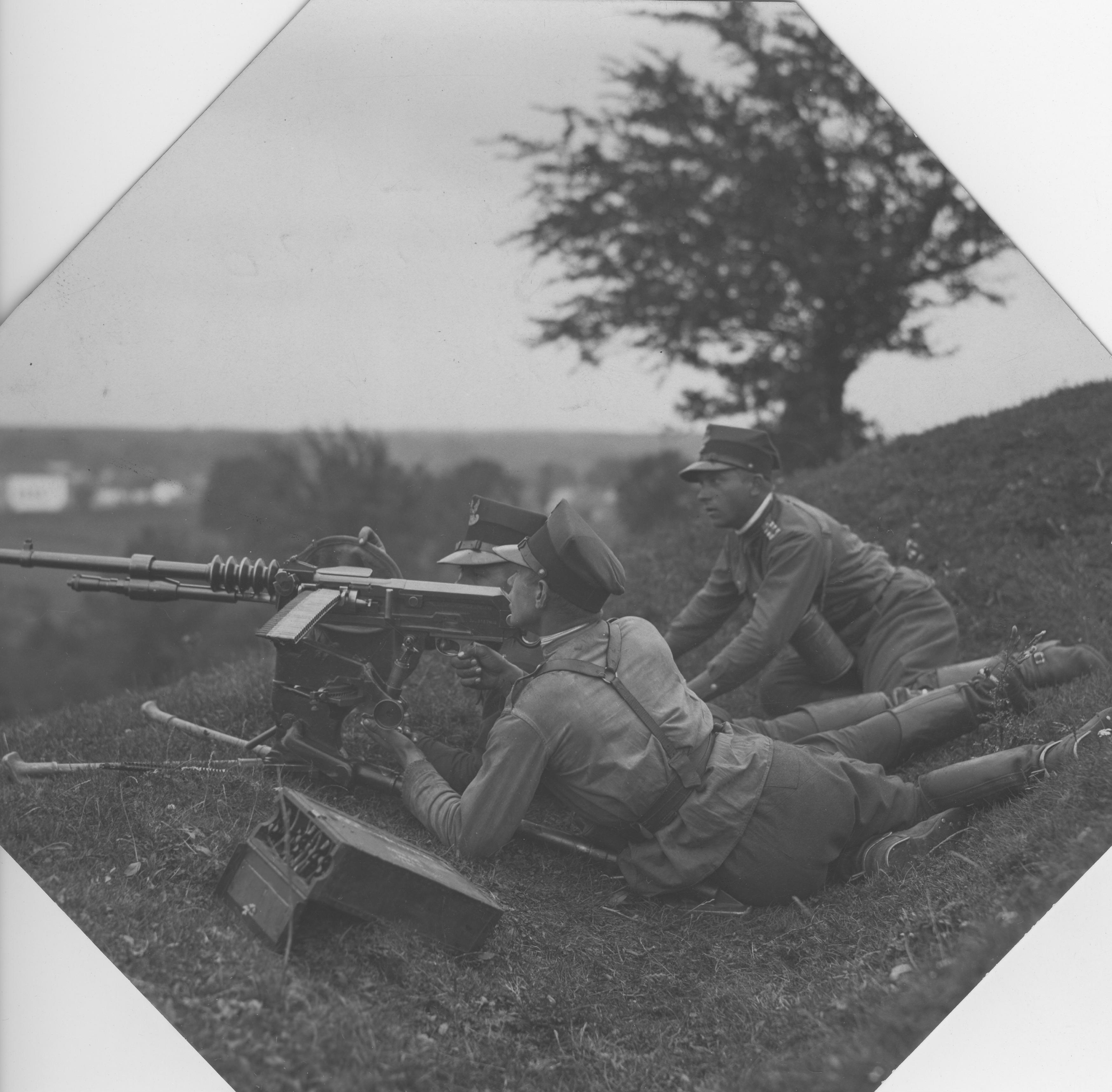
ckm wz. 25 machine gun crew during exercise, 1931

Poland received its first Mle 1914 Hotchkiss machine guns together with the arrival of the Blue Army in 1919. During and after the Polish-Bolshevik War the Polish Army bought additional guns in France and by 1936 there were 2,620 guns in Polish service (used under the ckm wz. 14 - "HMG Mk. 1914"). In the mid-1920s the army ordered 1,250 guns of a slightly modified version rechambered to the standard 7.92×57mm Mauser calibre. However, the army found that the newly delivered machine guns, dubbed ckm wz.25 Hotchkiss were substandard: the barrel was prone to overheating and the accuracy was found to be too low.

Instead of trying to renegotiate the contract with Hotchkiss, the Polish General Staff ordered large numbers of Ckm wz.30 machine guns instead and both 1914 and 1925 models of Hotchkiss were withdrawn from infantry service by 1936. Some were sold abroad; many were modified to arm the Renault FT tanks, TK-3 and TKS tankettes, and Samochód pancerny wz. 29 and wz. 34 armored cars. During the Invasion of Poland of 1939, the wz. 25 and wz. 14 machine guns were nevertheless used in combat by some Polish infantry units, notably the Border Defence Corps and National Defense.

=== In Spain ===
Spain bought the license of the Hotchkiss machine gun Model 1903, firing the 7×57mm Mauser ammunition. Adopted as the standard heavy machine gun of the Spanish Army, it was built at Oviedo. 2,000 were in service when the Civil War broke and they were widely used by the conflicting parties involved. This machine gun also saw action during the Ifni War in 1957–1958.

=== Other countries ===
Hotchkiss machine guns firing 7 mm Mauser ammunition equipped both sides (government and rebels) during the Mexican Revolution (1911–1920). Furthermore, the Mle 1914 Hotchkiss in 8 mm Lebel was mounted in all French tanks and armored cars of World War I. Some examples of tanks that used the Mle 1914 Hotchkiss include the Schneider CA1, Saint-Chamond, Renault FT and Char 2C. Conversely, British tanks and armored cars were fitted with the distinctly different Mle 1909 light Hotchkiss (a.k.a. the "Benét–Mercié"). A recently published series of modern firing tests with vintage machine guns summarizes the Mle 1914 Hotchkiss as being: "A heavy and rock-steady combination of gun and tripod, the world's first efficient air cooled machine gun is admirably reliable and accurate" (Robert Bruce, 1997). These qualities provided the French military with an excuse to keep the Hotchkiss in active service far beyond its point of obsolescence and into World War II. The last recorded uses of the Hotchkiss by the French Army were in Indochina and Algeria, after World War II, to defend outposts in static positions. It is said to have been used by Communist forces in Korean and Vietnam Wars.

== Variants ==
- M^{le} 1897
- M^{le} 1900
- M^{le} 1909
- M^{le} 1914

== Users ==
- Algeria – Used by the National Liberation Army
- Belgium – In 7.65×53mm Mauser.
- Brazil – Mle 1897 and Mle 1914
- Chile – Mle 1897 and Type 3 machine guns.
- Republic of China
- People's Republic of China
- Czechoslovakia
- Ethiopian Empire
- Kingdom of Greece
- Kingdom of Italy – Mle 1908/1914
- El Salvador – Mle 1914
- Finland – Used in FT-17 tanks. Later replaced in 1937 by the Maxim M/09-31 derived from the 7,62 ITKK 31 VKT.
- France
- Nazi Germany – Captured French guns were given the Fremdgerät designation 8 mm s.MG 257(f).
- Empire of Japan – Mle 1897 and later Type 3 heavy machine gun.
- Manchukuo – Ex-Chinese machine guns.
- Mexico – Mle 1897, and Mle 1914.
- New Zealand – In December 1899, the New Zealand Government received four of the latest pattern M1898 Hotchkiss .303 caliber machine guns complete with equipment and pack saddle as a gift from the W G Armstrong–Elswick Armament Company accompanied by an expert instructor. New Zealand agreed to provide the 40 horses and 30 men to make up the New Zealand Hotchkiss Machine Gun Battery, part of the 2nd Contingent which arrived in South Africa in January 1900. The Battery was disbanded in June 1900.
- Norway – Hotchkiss machine guns chambered in 6.5×55mm Swedish, adopted in 1911, some were converted to 7.92×61mm Norwegian.
- Peru
- Poland
- Portugal – Distributed mainly to naval forces fighting in Africa during the Great War.
- Romania
- Russian SFSR – Several Red Army units used Hotchkiss Mle 1914 during Russian Civil War.
- Spain
- Sweden – Kulspruta m/1900, in 6.5×55mm Swedish.
- Turkey – In 7.92×57mm Mauser.
- United States
- Uruguay – Mle 1897, Mle 1900 and Mle 1914 in 7mm Máuser it was used between 1919 and 1960.
- Vietnam – Used by Viet Minh.
- Venezuela – Mle 1897.
- Yugoslavia
