= French submarine La Sultane (Q177) =

Argonaute-class submarine, French Navy, 1935

History

France
- Name: La Sultane
- Namesake: Sultana, a female royal title, and the feminine form of the word sultan
- Builder: Chantiers Schneider et Cie, Chalon-sur-Saône, France
- Laid down: 3 February 1931
- Launched: 5 August 1932
- Commissioned: 20 May 1935
- Fate: Condemned 26 December 1946
- Stricken: 27 December 1946

General characteristics
- Type: Submarine
- Displacement: 630 tonnes (620 long tons) surfaced; 798 tonnes (785 long tons) submerged
- Length: 63.4 m (208 ft)
- Beam: 6.4 m (21 ft)
- Draught: 4.24 m (13.9 ft)
- Propulsion: 2 × Schneider-Carel diesel engines, 1,300 bhp (969 kW); 2 × electric motors, 1,000 shp (746 kW); 2 shafts
- Speed: 14 knots (26 km/h; 16 mph) surfaced; 9 knots (17 km/h; 10 mph) submerged
- Range: 4,000 nmi (7,400 km) at 10 knots (19 km/h; 12 mph) surfaced; 82 nmi (152 km) at 5 knots (9.3 km/h; 5.8 mph) submerged
- Test depth: 80 m (260 ft)
- Complement: 41
- Armament: 6 × 550 mm (22 in) torpedo tubes; 2 × 400 mm (16 in) torpedo tubes; 1 × 75 mm (3 in) deck gun; 1 × 8 mm (0.31 in) machine gun

La Sultane (Q177) was an Argonaute-class submarine commissioned into service in the French Navy in 1935. She saw service in World War II, first on the side of the Allies from September 1939 to June 1940, then in the forces of Vichy France until November 1942, when she became part of the Free French Naval Forces. She was stricken in 1946.

French sources sometimes refer to the submarine simply as Sultane, either instead of or interchangeably with La Sultane.

== Construction and commissioning ==
La Sultane was authorized in the 1929 naval program. Laid down by Chantiers Schneider et Cie at Chalon-sur-Saône, France, on 3 February 1931 with the pennant number Q177, she was launched on 5 August 1932. She was commissioned on 20 May 1935.

== Service history ==
=== French Navy ===
When World War II began with Nazi Germany′s invasion of Poland on 1 September 1939, La Sultane was stationed at Bizerte in Tunisia as part of the 17th Submarine Division in the 6th Squadron, a component of the 4th Flotilla in Maritime Prefecture IV. Also in the division were her sister ships Aréthuse, Atalante, and La Vestale. France entered the war on 3 September 1939.

The Battle of France began when German ground forces advanced into France, the Netherlands, Belgium, and Luxembourg on 10 May 1940. Italy declared war on France on 10 June 1940 and joined the invasion. La Sultane was among nine submarines scheduled to depart Toulon on 18 June 1940 bound for French North Africa, but the departure never took place and all nine submarines remained at Toulon.

The Battle of France ended in France's defeat and armistices with Germany on 22 June and with Italy on 24 June, both of which went into effect on 25 June 1940. On that day, La Sultane was at Toulon.

=== Vichy France ===
After the June 1940 armistice, La Sultane served in the naval forces of Vichy France. When the attack on Mers-el-Kébir — in which a British Royal Navy squadron attacked a French Navy squadron moored at the naval base at Mers El Kébir near Oran on the coast of Algeria — took place on 3 July 1940, she was a part of Group B at Toulon along with the submarines Céres, Iris, Pallas, Sirène, and Vénus. In response to the British attack, Group B received orders to form a patrol line from south of Ayre Island to the coast of Algeria between Ténès and Dellys with 25 nautical miles (46 km; 29 mi) between submarines, attack any British warships they encountered with an attack on the battlecruiser HMS Hood as their highest priority, then make port at Oran. Under strict radio silence, Group B got underway at 05:00 on 4 July 1940, but their orders were rescinded, and they returned to Toulon on 5 July.

With tensions with the United Kingdom still high, La Sultane, Sirène, and the submarines Diamant, Galatée, and Perle anchored at La Vignettes at 20:00 on 9 July 1940 on alert to defend Toulon while Cérès, Iris, Pallas, and Vénus patrolled in the Mediterranean Sea 20 nautical miles (37 km; 23 mi) south of Toulon. With the British force in the Mediterranean reported to be heading for Gibraltar on 10 July, all the submarines were recalled to Toulon.

In October 1940, Le Sultane was disarmed and placed under guard at Toulon under the terms of the June 1940 armistice. She was reactivated by December 1940. On 9 December 1940, the 17th Submarine Division — now reduced to La Sultane, Aréthuse, and La Vestale — departed Toulon in company with the submarine Archimède and the Élan-class sloop-of-war Commandant Bory bound for Casablanca in French Morocco, which they reached on 16 December. From Casablanca, the 17th Submarine Division proceeded to Dakar in Senegal. Atalante later joined them there and again became part of the division.

By August 1941, La Sultane was back at Casablanca. On 6 August, she and Aréthuse got underway from Casablanca bound for Port Lyautey, French Morocco, where they made a port call from 6 to 10 August. On 12 September 1941, the two submarines departed Casbalanca bound for Safi, French Morocco, where they arrived that evening. La Sultane remained at Safi until 20 September, when the submarine Le Conquérant relieved her. La Sultane joined Aréthuse at Agadir, French Morocco, that day, remaining there until 22 September 1941. On 29 September, she proceeded to Casablanca.

On 4 March 1942, the four submarines of the 17th Submarine Division departed Casablanca bound for Toulon where they were to undergo streamlining. With the work completed on all four of its submarines, the 17th Submarine Division departed Toulon on 30 September 1942 to return to Casablanca.

In October 1942, La Sultane and Atalante took part in the maneuvers of the 2nd Light Squadron, and they called at Agadir sometime around 20 October. La Sultane is recorded as having been at sea in the Atlantic on 1 November 1942 during a voyage from Casablanca to Dakar in company with Aréthuse, Atalante, and La Vestale. Arriving at Dakar in early November, the 17th Submarine Division relieved the 16th Submarine Division, which moved to Casablanca on 7 November 1942.

While La Sultane was at Dakar, Allied forces landed in French North Africa in Operation Torch on 8 November 1942. Fighting between Allied and Vichy French forces ended on 11 November 1942.

=== Free France ===
After the cessation of hostilities between Allied and French forces in French North Africa, French forces in Africa, including La Sultane, joined the forces of Free France. La Vestale became a unit of the Free French Naval Forces.

In March 1943, La Sultane patrolled in the Mediterranean Sea. By 1 April 1943, she was one of eight French submarines at the submarine base at Oran in Algeria. During April 1943, La Sultane, Aréthuse, and the submarines Antiope and Perle took part in patrols off the coast of Southern France between Cannes and Marseille.

On 19 August 1943, La Sultane was crippled by an Italian vedette.

La Sultane and the submarine Orphée occupied patrol areas off Toulon and Saint-Raphaël, France, from January to March 1944. During April and May 1944, La Sultane continued to operate off the coast of Southern France, making stops at La Maddalena, Sardinia, on the way to and from her patrol areas. On 28 April 1944 she landed four agents and picked up one off Barcelona, Spain.

At 20:50 on 9 May 1944, La Sultane fired three torpedoes at the German submarine chaser UJ 6070 and the German minesweeper M 6027 off Villefranche-sur-Mer, France, but scored no hits. She fired three torpedoes at M 6027 and the German minesweeper M 6020 off Cape Antibes at 21:10 on 12 May 1944, again without success. In a friendly fire incident on 15 May 1944, an Allied plane which either ignored or failed to see her recognition signals mistook her for a German U-boat and bombed and strafed her. On 6 June 1944 she brought aboard four agents off Barcelona.

Operation Dragoon, the Allied amphibious landings in Provence on the coast of Southern France, took place on 15 August 1944. After the Allies seized Marseille, La Sultane called there on 20 August 1944, becoming the first Allied submarine to visit a French port since the June 1940 armistice.

In December 1944, the crews of La Sultane, Archimède, and the submarine Le Glorieux were placed on shore leave, and the three submarines were used to generate electricity for Toulon. World War II came to an end with the surrender of Japan in August 1945.

On October 30, 1945, La Sultane departed Oran bound for La Pallice, France. She arrived at Lorient on 24 November 1945. She returned to La Pallice on 30 November and arrived at Brest on 1 February 1946. She arrived at Casablanca on 26 February 1946. After calling at Oran, she arrived at Algiers on 12 May 1946. She returned to Brest on 2 July 1946, then made for Le Havre on 10 July. She arrived at Cherbourg on 26 July 1946.

La Sultane was condemned on 26 December 1946 and stricken from the navy list on 27 December 1946.

== See also ==
- List of submarines of France
- French submarines of World War II
