= French aviso Calais =

Aviso of the French Navy

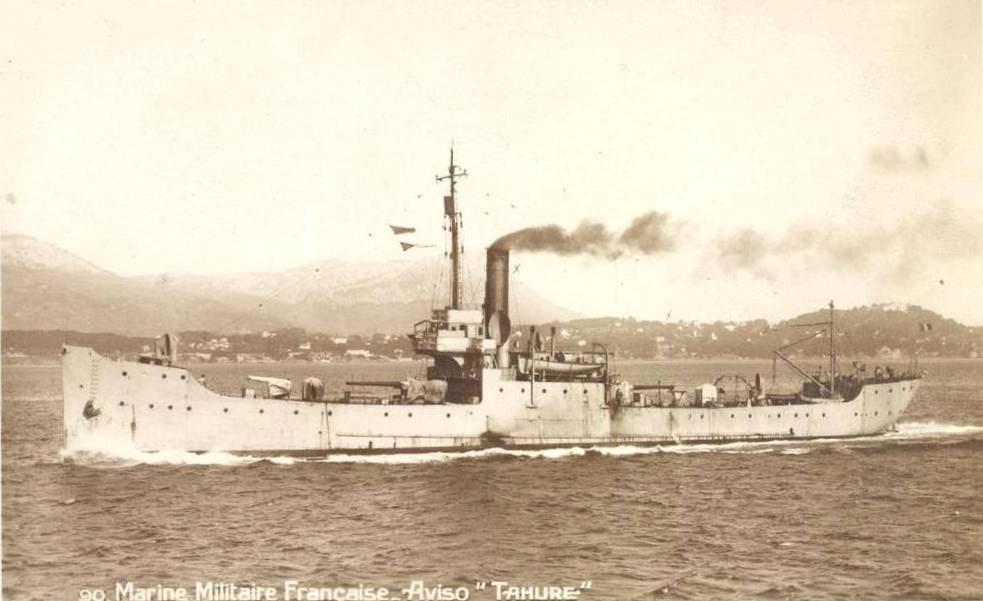
- Sister ship Tahura in 1939

History

France
- Name: Calais
- Builder: Chantiers de la Méditerranée, La Seyne-sur-Mer
- Laid down: 1918
- Launched: 1919
- Completed: 1920
- Fate: Sold to be broken up

General characteristics (as built)
- Displacement: 850 long tons (864 t) standard
- Length: 74.9 m (245 ft 9 in) o/a
- Beam: 8.7 m (28 ft 7 in)
- Draught: 3.2 m (10 ft 6 in)
- Installed power: Guyot du Temple boilers 3,000 shp (2,200 kW)
- Propulsion: Parsons steam turbines, 2 shafts
- Speed: 22 knots (25 mph; 41 km/h)
- Range: 3,000 nmi (5,600 km; 3,500 mi) at 11 knots (20 km/h; 13 mph)
- Complement: 103
- Armament: 2 × single 138.6 mm (5 in)/55 Modèle 1910 guns; 1 × single 75 mm (3 in)/62.5 Modèle 1908 gun; 4 × single 8 mm (0.31 in)/80 Modèle 1914 Hotchkiss guns; 2 × depth charge throwers

Calais was an aviso of the Arras class, also known as the Amiens class, that served in the Second World War. Ordered by the French Navy at the end of the First World War, the ships were designed as fast escorts with a primary armament of two 138.6 mm (5 in) guns and depth charges. Launched in 1919, Calais was deployed to the Mediterranean Sea. While serving as a patrol ship during the Rif War, the vessel operated with the submarines Galatée, Naïade, Nymphe, and Sirène, undertaking training exercises including a mock battle. During the Second World War, the aviso participated in the Battle of Dakar, rescuing sailors from the sinking submarine Persée. In 1946, Calais was sold and broken up.

== Design and development ==
Calais was a member of the Arras or Amiens class, a class of thirty fast avisos or sloops, designed to serve as escort ships and ordered under the 1916 and 1917 French Navy construction plans. The ships were similar in layout to three-island merchant ships with a high bow, which meant that they sailed well in high seas, keeping their crew dry. They were considered roomy and comfortable ships, although the weight of their armament and superstructure meant that they rolled heavily.

The aviso had a length of 72 m (236 ft 2.6 in) between perpendiculars and 74.9 m (245 ft 8.8 in) overall, with a beam of 8.7 m (28 ft 6.5 in) and draught of 3.2 m (10 ft 6.0 in). Normal displacement was 850 long tons (860 t). Power was provided by two Guyot du Temple water-tube boilers feeding two sets of Parsons geared steam turbines rated at 5,000 shaft horsepower (3,700 kW). These drove two shafts and exhausted through two funnels. Design speed was 22 knots (41 km/h; 25 mph), and a total of 200 long tons (200 t) of fuel oil was carried, which gave a design range of 3,000 nautical miles (5,600 km; 3,500 mi) at 11 knots (20 km/h; 13 mph). The ship had a complement of four officers and 99 enlisted crew.

Calais had a main armament consisting of two single 138.6 mm (5 in) 55 calibre Modèle 1910 guns. Each could typically fire a 39.5 kg (87 lb) shell at a rate of five or six rounds per minute. They were mounted on the centreline, one forward and the other aft of the superstructure. A single 75 mm (3 in) 62.5 calibre anti-aircraft gun and four 8 mm (0.31 in) 80 calibre Modèle 1914 Hotchkiss machine guns were also carried. The anti-aircraft gun was derived from a 1897 field gun and could typically fire a 7.4 kg (16 lb) shrapnel shell at a rate of 20 rounds per minute. For anti-submarine warfare, the aviso was fitted with two throwers for twenty depth charges.

== Construction and career ==
Laid down by Chantiers de la Méditerranée at their shipyard in La Seyne-sur-Mer in 1918, Calais was launched in 1919 and completed in 1920. The first ship of the name in the French fleet, the vessel was the second to be completed from the yard after sister ship Amiens. She began trials shortly after the other ship had been cleared to enter service on 7 July. On 4 May 1921, the vessel visited Ajaccio in Corsica to commemorate the centenary of the death of Napoleon.

During the Rif War, the success of the Riffian force under Abd el-Krim led to Spain agreeing with France on joint responsibility for the security of the coastline of their north African colonies. In particular, the countries were concerned about arms imports to the Riffian army. On 4 March 1922, the ship left Toulon to travel to Bizerte, arriving the following day. On 16 March 1923, the ship arrived at Bône, Algeria. The aviso joined the ex-German light cruiser Strasbourg, previously Regensburg, monitoring the Moroccan coast. On 27 December, the ship took a break from this operation and participated in the unsuccessful search for the airship Dixmude.

The ship returned to serve in the blockade until 13 August 1926, when the force was stood down. During the period, the aviso was joined by a wide range of French and Spanish vessels, including sister ship Montmirail and supported French colonial troops from Senegal and Morocco. On 25 May 1928, the aviso, along with sister ship Bapaume, returned to Algiers harbour and was subjected to a mock attack by the Sirène-class submarines Galatée, Naïade, Nymphe and Sirène. The ship then accompanied these submarines on a return visit to Bougie between 5 and 8 September 1931.

On 8 September 1937, the vessel arrived in Casablanca, Morocco. At the start of the Second World War, the aviso was called up. The French Navy dominated the Mediterranean Sea but, on 15 November 1939, withdrew most of the forces for other theatres. On 23 September 1940, the aviso was one of the French Navy ships in Dakar when the Royal Navy attacked the port in the Battle of Dakar. During the battle, Calais rescued the crew of the sinking submarine Persée. After the war, in 1946, Calais was sold to be broken up.

== Bibliography ==
- Castex, Jean-Claude (2004). Dictionnaire des Batailles Navales Franco-Anglaises [Dictionary of Franco-British Naval Battles]. Québec: Les Presses de l'Université Laval. ISBN 978-2-76378-061-0.
- Friedman, Norman (2011). Naval Weapons of World War One: Guns, Torpedoes, Mines and ASW Weapons of All Nations; An Illustrated Directory. Barnsley: Seaforth Publishing. ISBN 978-1-84832-100-7.
- Labayle Couhat, Jean (1974). French Warships of World War I. Shepperton: Ian Allen. ISBN 978-0-71100-445-0.
- Le Conte, Pierre (1932). Répertoire des Navires de Guerre Français [Directory of French Warships] (in French). Cherbourg: Pierre Le Conte, La Villarion, rue des Bastions. OCLC 1400324432.
- Salerno, Reginald M. (2002). Vital Crossroads: Mediterranean origins of the Second World War, 1935-1940. Ithaca: Cornell University Press. ISBN 978-0-80143-772-4.
- Smigielski, Adam (1985). "France". In Gardiner, Robert; Gray, Randal (eds.). Conway's All the World's Fighting Ships 1906–1921. London: Conway Maritime Press. ISBN 978-0-85177-245-5.
