= French submarine Sirène (Q123) =

Sirène
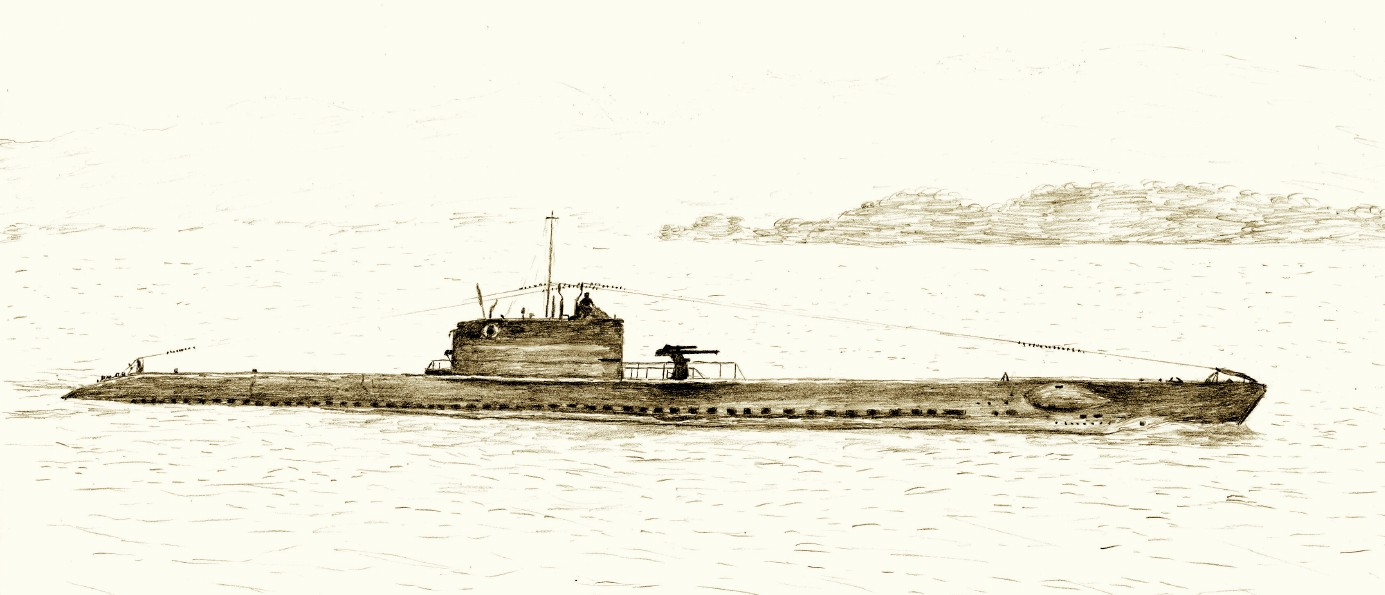

History

France
- Name: Sirène
- Namesake: Siren
- Builder: Ateliers et Chantiers de la Loire, Saint-Nazaire, France
- Laid down: 28 November 1923
- Launched: 6 August 1925
- Commissioned: 12 March 1927
- Fate: Scrapped

General characteristics
- Class & type: Sirène-class submarine
- Displacement: 609 long tons (619 t) surfaced; 757 long tons (769 t) submerged
- Length: 64 m (210 ft 0 in)
- Beam: 5.2 m (17 ft 1 in)
- Draught: 4.3 m (14 ft 1 in)
- Speed: 13.5 knots (25.0 km/h; 15.5 mph) surfaced; 7.5 knots (13.9 km/h; 8.6 mph) submerged
- Range: 3,500 nmi (6,500 km; 4,000 mi) at 7.5 kn (13.9 km/h; 8.6 mph)
- Complement: 41
- Armament: 7 × 550 mm (22 in) torpedo tubes; 1 × 75 mm (3 in) deck gun; 2 × 8 mm (0.31 in) machine guns

Sirène (Q123) was a French Navy Sirène-class submarine commissioned in 1927. She participated in World War II, first on the side of the Allies from 1939 to June 1940, then in the navy of Vichy France. She was scuttled in November 1942.

== Characteristics ==
The Sirène-class submarines had a displacement of 609 long tons (619 t) surfaced and 757 long tons (769 t) submerged. They had an endurance of 3,500 nautical miles (6,500 km; 4,000 mi) at 7.5 knots (13.9 km/h; 8.6 mph), with a maximum surface speed of 13.5 knots (25.0 km/h; 15.5 mph), and a submerged speed of 7.5 knots (13.9 km/h; 8.6 mph). Their armament was seven torpedo tubes (three forward, two amidships, and two aft) and carried 13 torpedoes. As with all French submarines of this period, the midships torpedo tubes were fitted externally in trainable mounts. The submarines had a single 75 mm (3 in) and two 8 mm machine guns. The submarines were manned by crews of 41 men.

== Construction and commissioning ==
Laid down at Ateliers et Chantiers de la Loire in Saint-Nazaire, France, on 28 November 1923 with the pennant number Q123, Sirène was launched on 6 August 1925. She ran her official trials from 1 September 1925 to 11 March 1926. On 1 June 1926, she was departing Brest Arsenal at Brest, France, when her steering failed and she collided with the torpedo boat Chastaing. She suffered a deep tear in her stern above the waterline, but no one aboard either vessel suffered injuries. Sirène completed fitting out between 25 January and 12 March 1927. She was commissioned on 12 March 1927.

== Service history ==
=== French Navy ===
Jean-Marie Querville, a future admiral, served as Sirène's commanding officer from 1934 to 1936.

World War II began with the German invasion of Poland on 1 September 1939, and when France entered the war on 3 September, Sirène was a unit of the 19th Submarine Division at Toulon, France, with the submarines Naïade, Galatée, and Argonaute. With the outbreak of war, the division was placed under the command of the maritime prefect of the 3rd Region. French naval forces at Toulon primarily were concerned with opposing Italian forces in the event that Italy entered the war on Germany's side.

The Battle of France began when German ground forces advanced into France, the Netherlands, Belgium, and Luxembourg on 10 May 1940. The threat of Italian entry into the war increased thereafter, and in response the French on 26 May began stationing two Toulon-based submarines — Sirène among them — on a rotating basis at Îles d'Hyères, from which they could reach defensive patrol areas off Nice and Saint-Tropez within two hours. On 1 June 1940, as tensions with Italy continued to increase, the French began stationing two submarines on the coast of Corsica, with Sirène taking station that day on alert at Calvi and Galatée at Ajaccio. On 5 June, Galatée relieved Sirène at Calvi and went on one-hour alert to get underway there, while Sirène moved to Ajaccio for a rest period.

Italy declared war on France on 10 June 1940 and joined the invasion of France that day. From 10 to 19 June, Sirène and Galatée took turns maintaining a defensive patrol in the Tyrrhenian Sea off Bastia and Alistro on the east coast of Corsica. The submarines Céres and Pallas relieved them of this duty on 19 June 1940. The Battle of France ended in France's defeat and armistice with Germany and Italy, which went into effect on 25 June 1940.

=== Vichy France ===
After the armistice went into effect, Sirène served in the naval forces of Vichy France. When the attack on Mers-el-Kébir — in which a British Royal Navy squadron attacked a French Navy squadron moored at the naval base at Mers El Kébir near Oran on the coast of Algeria on 3 July 1940 — took place, she was a part of Group B at Toulon along with Céres, Pallas, and the submarines Iris, Vénus, and La Sultane. In response to the British attack, Group B received orders to form a patrol line from south of Ayre Island to the coast of Algeria between Ténès and Dellys with 25 nautical miles (46 km; 29 mi) between submarines, then make port at Oran. On 4 July 1940, however, the submarines received orders to return to Toulon. With tensions with the United Kingdom still high, Sirène, Galatée, La Sultane, and the submarines Diamant and Perle anchored on alert at Vignettes on 9 July 1940.

The 19th Submarine Division was dissolved on 1 September 1940. Its submarines were integrated into the 5th squadron of the 1st Submarine Force.

According to one source, Sirène was decommissioned in September 1940 and placed under guard at Toulon in accordance with the terms of the 1940 armistice. According to another, she was decommissioned on 1 July 1941. She subsequently was cannibalized for spare parts for other submarines. Unable get underway when Germany and Italy occupied the Free Zone (French: Zone libre) of Vichy France on 27 November 1942, Sirène was among the French vessels scuttled at Toulon to prevent their seizure by Germany when German forces entered Toulon that day.

== Final disposition ==
The Germans seized Sirène and handed her over to the Italians. An Italian firm, the Serra Roma Company, refloated Sirène in a salvage operation that began on 16 March 1943. Sources disagree on whether she was refloated on 21 or 23 March 1943, but she sank again the next day. The Italians again refloated her on 25 April 1943. She was not repaired.

After Italy surrendered to the Allies in September 1943, the Germans took control of Sirène. They declared her "unusable," and on 26 January 1944, towed her to Breigaillon at La Seyne-sur-Mer and moored her there. U.S. bombers sank her during a raid on 29 April 1944. After the Germans refloated her, they decided on 16 May 1944 to return Sirène and Galatée to French control so that they could serve as a source of spare parts and equipment. Sirène was sunk again in an Allied air raid on Toulon on 22 June 1944. Refloated in June 1945, she probably subsequently served as a float. She was sold for scrapping in September 1945 and was scrapped at Marseille, France.

== See also ==
- List of submarines of France
- French submarines of World War II
