= French submarine Galatée (Q132) =

French naval vessel (1927–1942)

Galatée
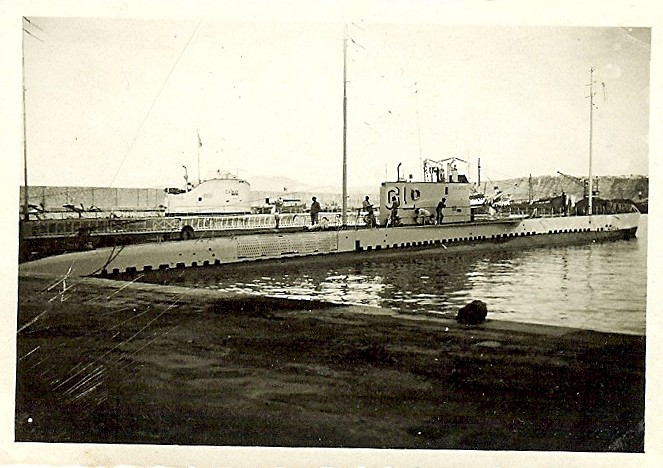
- Submarines moored at Lamoune Wharf at Oran, Algeria, on 31 May 1934. Galatée (conning tower marking "GL") is in the foreground. Caïman is in the background.

History

France
- Name: Galatée
- Namesake: Galatea
- Ordered: 30 June 1922
- Builder: Ateliers et Chantiers de la Loire, Saint-Nazaire, France
- Laid down: 1 February 1924
- Launched: 18 December 1925
- Commissioned: 6 May 1927
- Fate: Scuttled 27 November 1942; Seized by Germany; Transferred to Italy; Refloated 2 December 1942 or 25 June 1943; Seized by Germany September 1943; Sunk 5 July 1944; Refloated and hulked 1945; Scuttled 17 March 1949

General characteristics
- Type: Submarine
- Displacement: 609 long tons (619 t) surfaced; 757 long tons (769 t) submerged
- Length: 64 m (210 ft 0 in)
- Beam: 5.2 m (17 ft 1 in)
- Draught: 4.3 m (14 ft 1 in)
- Speed: 13.5 knots (25.0 km/h; 15.5 mph) surfaced; 7.5 knots (13.9 km/h; 8.6 mph) submerged
- Range: 3,500 nmi (6,500 km) at 7.5 kn (13.9 km/h; 8.6 mph)
- Complement: 41
- Armament: 7 × 550 mm (22 in) torpedo tubes; 1 × 75 mm (3 in) deck gun; 2 × 8 mm (0.31 in) machine guns

Galatée (Q132) was a French Navy Sirène-class submarine commissioned in 1927. She participated in World War II, first on the side of the Allies from 1939 to June 1940, then in the navy of Vichy France. She was scuttled in November 1942.

== Characteristics ==
The Sirène-class submarines had a displacement of 609 long tons (619 t) surfaced and 757 long tons (769 t) submerged.t They had an endurance of 3,500 nautical miles (6,500 km; 4,000 mi) at 7.5 knots (13.9 km/h; 8.6 mph), with a maximum surface speed of 13.5 knots (25.0 km/h; 15.5 mph), and a submerged speed of 7.5 knots (13.9 km/h; 8.6 mph). Their armament was seven torpedo tubes (three forward, two amidships, and two aft) and carried 13 torpedoes. As with all French submarines of this period, the midships torpedo tubes were fitted externally in trainable mounts. The submarines had a single 75 mm (3 in) and two 8 mm machine guns, and were manned by crews of 41 men.

== Construction and commissioning ==
Ordered on 30 June 1922 and Laid down at Ateliers et Chantiers de la Loire in Saint-Nazaire, France, on 1 February 1924 with the pennant number Q132, Galatée was launched on 18 December 1925. She was commissioned on 6 May 1927.

== Service history ==
=== French Navy ===
On 29 December 1927, a compressed air cylinder exploded aboard Galatée while she was moored at the Toulon arsenal in Toulon, France, with no one aboard. The explosion knocked down several bulkheads and demolished the cupboards in the commanding officer's cabin. Investigators assessed that there could have been a substantial loss of life if her crew had been aboard.

World War II began with the German invasion of Poland on 1 September 1939, and when France entered the war on 3 September, Galatée was a unit of the 19th Submarine Division at Toulon, France, with the submarines Naïade, Sirène, and Argonaute. With the outbreak of war, the division was placed under the command of the maritime prefect of the 3rd Region. French naval forces at Toulon primarily were concerned with opposing Italian forces in the event that Italy entered the war on Germany's side.

The Battle of France began when German ground forces advanced into France, the Netherlands, Belgium, and Luxembourg on 10 May 1940. The threat of Italian entry into the war increased thereafter, and in response the French on 26 May began stationing two Toulon-based submarines — Galatée among them — on a rotating basis at Îles d'Hyères, from which they could reach defensive patrol areas off Nice and Saint-Tropez within two hours. On 1 June 1940, as tensions with Italy continued to increase, the French began stationing two submarines on the coast of Corsica, with Sirène taking station that day on alert at Calvi and Galatée at Ajaccio. On 5 June, Galatée relieved Sirène at Calvi and went on one-hour alert to get underway there, while Sirène moved to Ajaccio for a rest period.

Italy declared war on France on 10 June 1940 and joined the invasion of France that day. From 10 to 19 June, Galatée and Sirène took turns maintaining a defensive patrol in the Tyrrhenian Sea off Bastia and Alistro on the east coast of Corsica. The submarines Céres and Pallas relieved them of this duty on 19 June 1940.

The Battle of France ended in France's defeat and armistice with Germany and Italy, which went into effect on 25 June 1940.

=== Vichy France ===
After the armistice went into effect, Galatée served in the naval forces of Vichy France. On 3 July 1940, a British Royal Navy squadron attacked a French Navy squadron moored at the naval base at Mers El Kébir near Oran on the coast of Algeria, and, with tensions with the United Kingdom running high, Sirène, Galatée, and the submarines Diamant, La Sultane, and Perle anchored on alert at Vignettes on 9 July 1940 in case the British attempted an attack on Toulon.

The 19th Submarine Division was dissolved on 1 September 1940. Its submarines were integrated into the 5th Squadron of the 1st Submarine Force.

From 16 June to 30 July 1941, Galatée underwent a major refit in a floating drydock at the Arsenal of Sidi-Abdallah at Bizerte, Tunisia. After post-overhaul trials from 10 to 12 August 1941, she proceeded to Toulon, which she reached on 27 August 1941. She then conducted a patrol from 1 to 12 September 1941. She was decommissioned on 25 September 1942 and moored at Brégaillon in Toulon. Under guard in an unarmed and unfueled state in accordance with the terms of the 1940 armistice and unable get underway when Germany and Italy occupied the Free Zone (French: Zone libre) of Vichy France on 27 November 1942, Galatée was among the French vessels scuttled at Toulon to prevent their seizure by Germany when German forces entered Toulon that day.

== Final disposition ==
The Germans seized Galatée and handed her over to the Italians, who refloated her on either 2 December 1942 or 25 June 1943, according to different sources. She was placed in reserve at the Toulon arsenal.

After Italy surrendered to the Allies on 8 September 1943, the Germans took control of Galatée. On 9 September 1943, a German mission visited the 14 French submarines at Toulon and deemed 12 of them unusable but decided that Galatée and the submarine Aurore merited repair and could be operational again in seven to eight months. In January 1944, Galatée was moved to the west quay at Missiéssy Dock, and she was moored at Brégaillon on 3 February 1944. On 16 May 1944, the Germans decided to hand Galatée over to French authorities to provide a reserve of equipment, and the handover took place on 4 July 1944. On 5 July 1944, an Allied air raid sank Galatée at Toulon. Galatée was refloated in 1945 and hulked for use as a float. She was scuttled on 17 March 1949.

== See also ==
- List of submarines of France
- French submarines of World War II
