= List of specifications of submarines of World War II =

Submarines of World War II represented a wide range of capabilities with many types of varying specifications produced by dozens of countries. The principle countries engaged in submarine warfare during the war were Germany, Italy, Japan, the United States, United Kingdom and the Soviet Union. The Italian and Soviet fleets were the largest. While the German and US fleets fought anti-shipping campaigns (in the Atlantic and Pacific respectively), the British and Japanese submarines were mostly engaged against enemy warships.

== Specifications ==
Specifications of the principle submarines of World War II
Country	Class	Type	Variants	First commissioned	Production	Class lost	Enemy ships sunk	Displacement (tons) surfaced submerged	Length (feet)	Beam (feet)	Draft (feet)	Propulsion	Speed (knots) surfaced submerged	Range (nautical miles) surfaced submerged	Diving depth (feet)	Complement	Armament (non-torpedo)	Torpedo tubes	Torpedoes	Notable	Comments
France	600 series	Coastal patrol	Sirène, Ariane, Circé, Orion, Diane, Argonaute classes	1927	28	18	TBD	599–641; 745–809	205–216	16–18	14–20	Diesel (1,200–1,420 hp) Electric (1,000 hp), 2 shafts	14; 7.5–9	3,500–4,000; 75–82	80	41	1×75–100 mm	6–7×22" (2–3 forward, 2 midships, 2 aft			
France	Redoutable	Oceangoing patrol	Types I, II	Jul 1931	31	28	3	1,572; 2,082	303	27	16	Diesel (4,300 hp) Electric (1,200 hp), 2 shafts	17; 10	14,000; 90	120	85	1×100mm	9×22"; 2×16"	11	Bévéziers	Served with Allies and Axis
Germany	Type VII	Oceangoing attack	Types A, B, C, C/41	Jun 1938	695	437	277	753; 857	218	20	14	Diesel (3,200 hp) Electric (750 hp), 2 shafts	18; 8	8,700; 90	720	44	1×88mm	5×21" (4 bow, 1 stern)	14	U-47, U-99, U-100	Very successful Atlantic commerce raider
Germany	Type IX	Long-range oceangoing attack	Types A, B, C, D, D/42	Dec 1938	192	13?	TBD	1,032; 1,053	251	22	15	Diesel (2,800 hp) Electric (1,000 hp), 2 shafts	18; 7	12,000; 65	755	54	1×105mm	6×21" (4 bow, 2 stern)	24	TBD	Very successful Atlantic commerce raider
Germany	Type XXI	Long-range oceangoing attack electro-boat	Type A	Jun 1944	98	TBD	0	1,621; 1,819	252	22	20	Diesel (4,000 hp) Electric (4,800 hp), Silent electric (226 hp), 2 shafts	16; 17	15,500; 385	850	57	2×twin 20mm	6×21" (all bow)	23	TBD	Significant post-war impact
Japan	I-15	Long-range oceangoing attack	Types B1, B2, B3	Sep 1940	20	TBD	TBD	2,590; 3,655	356	30	17	Diesel (12,400 hp) Electric (2,000 hp), 2 shafts	24; 8	14,000; 100	330	100	1×140mm, 2×25, airplane,	6×21" (all bow)	18	TBD	Carried an airplane
Japan	Kaiten	Midget suicide	Types 1, 2, 3,4	1944-1945	2000+	TBD	0?	18; 18	48-54	3-4.5	3-4	Torpedo engine (550 hp) or Hydro-hydrazine (1,800 hp)	30-40; 30-40	23–38 km	TBD	1-2	1,500 kg warhead	0	0	TBD	Commonly intended as a suicide craft
Japan	Kohyoteki	Midget attack	Types A, B, C	1941?	101	TBD	0?	TBD; 47	79	6	10	Electric (600 hp)	23; 19	100; TBD	98	2	140 kg scuttling charge	2	2	TBD	Attacked Pearl Harbor and elsewhere
Netherlands	O21 Class	Oceangoing attack	None	1937	7	3?	TBD	990; 1205	77.7m	6.8m	3.95.	Diesel (2×2,500 hp) Electric (2×500 hp), 2 shafts	19.5; 9	10,000; 28	115m	39	1×88mm	8×21" (4 bow, 2 stern, 2 traversed)	22	TBD	Very successful Pacific commerce raider
United Kingdom	T-class	Oceangoing patrol	1st, 2nd and 3rd group	Dec 1938	53	about 25%	TBD	1,095; 1,585	276	25	14	Diesel (2,500 hp) Electric (1,450 hp), 2 shafts	16; 9	7,000; 80	300-350	up to 63	1×4" gun	10-11×21" (mostly bow)	16	Turbulent, Thrasher, Torbay	Served into the 1960s
United Kingdom	U-class	Coastal patrol	Group I, II, III ("V")	1938	70	TBD	TBD	562; 740	205	16	16	Diesel-electric (Note: The diesel engines were used for charging the batteries only) (825 shp), 2 shafts	12.75; 9	5,000 mi 120 mi	300	37	1×3" gun	4×21" (bow)	8	Venturer, Upholder	chiefly Mediterranean operations, used outside RN
United States	Gato	Long-range oceangoing attack	Gato, Balao, Tench	Nov 1941	228	31	TBD	1,526; 2,424	312	27	15	Diesel (5,400 hp) Electric (2,750 hp), 2 shafts	20; 9	12,000; 95	300-400	80	2×50 cal, 2 × 30 cal MG, 1×3"	10×21" (6 bow, 4 stern)	24	Flasher, Tang, Wahoo, Archerfish, Bowfin	Very successful type, main U.S. submarine

== Notes ==
Notes

Citations
