= French ship Pallas =

At least two ships of the French Navy have been named Pallas:

- French frigate Pallas (1821) a Téméraire-class ship of the line launched in 1813 as Colosse and renamed Pallas in 1821 on conversion to a frigate
- French frigate Pallas (1860), a sail frigate converted to steam power
- French submarine Pallas (1938) a Minerve-class submarine launched in 1938 and scuttled in 1942
