= French ship Naïade =

Thirteen ships of the French Navy have borne the name Naïade:

- French frigate Naïade (1692), a light frigate that took part in the Battle of Texel on 21 August 1673.
- French frigate Naïade (1696), a 20-gun light frigate, lead ship of the Nayade class.
- French frigate Naïade (1706), a 34-gun frigate.
- French corvette Naïade (1734), a 10-gun corvette.
- French corvette Naïade (1780), a 20-gun Coquette-class corvette.
- French corvette Naïade (1793), a 16-gun brig launched in 1793 and captured by the Royal Navy in 1805 who renamed her HMS Melville. She was sold for breaking up in 1808.
- French corvette Naïade (1812), a 20-gun corvette, ceded to Holland in 1814 as Eendracht.
- French corvette Naïade (1832), a 24-gun corvette that took part in the Battle of Veracruz in 1838.
- French cruiser Naïade, (1881) a 3,500-tonne wooden frigate launched in 1881.
- French submarine Naïade (1904), a Naïade-class submarine launched in 1904 and stricken in 1914.
- French submarine Naïade (Q124), a Sirène-class submarine launched in 1925 and scuttled in 1942, subsequently salvaged and sunk in 1943.
- French ship Naïade (1974), a boat of the diving school of the French Navy
- French ship Naïade (1980), a transport used to ferry personnel between Toulon and Levant Island. (Y702)

== Bibliography ==
- Roche, Jean-Michel (2005). Dictionnaire des bâtiments de la flotte de guerre française de Colbert à nos jours. Vol. 1. Group Retozel-Maury Millau. p. 280. ISBN 978-2-9525917-0-6. OCLC 165892922.
