= French submarine Argonaute (NN6) =

Argonaute-class submarine, French Navy, 1932

History

France
- Name: Argonaute
- Namesake: A member of the Argonauts, a band of heroes in Greek mythology
- Builder: Chantiers Schneider et Cie, Chalon-sur-Saône, France
- Laid down: 19 December 1927
- Launched: 23 May 1929
- Commissioned: 1 June 1932
- Fate: Sunk 8 November 1942

General characteristics
- Type: Submarine
- Displacement: 630 tonnes (620 long tons) surfaced; 798 tonnes (785 long tons) submerged
- Length: 63.4 m (208 ft)
- Beam: 6.4 m (21 ft)
- Draught: 4.24 m (13.9 ft)
- Propulsion: 2 × Schneider-Carel diesel engines, 1,300 bhp (969 kW); 2 × electric motors, 1,000 shp (746 kW); 2 shafts
- Speed: 14 knots (26 km/h; 16 mph) surfaced; 9 knots (17 km/h; 10 mph) submerged
- Range: 4,000 nmi (7,400 km) at 10 knots (19 km/h; 12 mph) surfaced; 82 nmi (152 km) at 5 knots (9.3 km/h; 5.8 mph) submerged
- Test depth: 80 m (260 ft)
- Complement: 41
- Armament: 6 × 550 mm (22 in) torpedo tubes; 2 × 400 mm (16 in) torpedo tubes; 1 × 75 mm (3 in) deck gun; 1 × 8 mm (0.31 in) machine gun

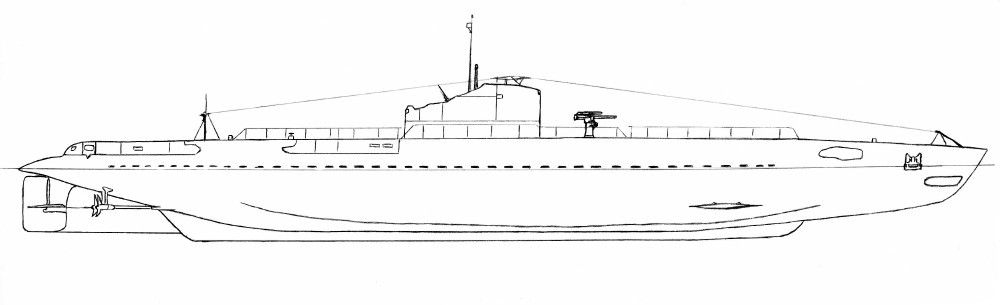
Schematic diagram of an Argonaute-class submarine

Argonaute (NN6) was an Argonaute-class submarine commissioned into service in the French Navy in 1932. She saw service in World War II, first on the side of the Allies from September 1939 to June 1940, then in the forces of Vichy France. She was sunk in November 1942.

== Construction and commissioning ==
Argonaute was ordered as part of the 1926 program. Laid down by Chantiers Schneider et Cie at Chalon-sur-Saône, France, on 19 December 1927 with the pennant number NN6, she was launched on 23 May 1929. She was commissioned on 1 June 1932 at Toulon, France.

== Service history ==
=== French Navy ===
Argonaute served at the school of navigation from 1939 to 1940. During her service there, World War II began with Nazi Germany′s invasion of Poland on 1 September 1939, and France entered the war on 3 September 1939. The Battle of France began when German ground forces advanced into France, the Netherlands, Belgium, and Luxembourg on 10 May 1940, and Italy declared war on France on 10 June 1940 and joined the invasion. The Battle of France ended in France's defeat and armistice with Germany and Italy, which went into effect on 25 June 1940. On that day, Argonaute was based at Toulon as part of the 19th Submarine Division with the submarines Galatée, Naïade, and Sirène.

=== Vichy France ===
After the June 1940 armistice, Argonaute served in the naval forces of Vichy France. She was placed under guard in an unarmed and unfueled status in accordance with the terms of the armistice on 17 December 1940.

Argonaute was reactivated in June 1941. By December 1941 she was based at Oran in Algeria as part of the 12th Submarine Division with the submarine Diane.

On 8 November 1942, Allied forces landed in French North Africa in Operation Torch. At 02:50 that morning, Argonaute and the 5th Submarine Division submarines Actéon and Fresnel received orders to sortie to resist the invasion. Argonaute departed at 03:15. Heading east from Oran, she sighted the British aircraft carrier HMS Furious during the afternoon of 8 November. Before she could attack Furious, the British destroyer HMS Achates sighted her at 15:17. Either Achates or the destroyer HMS Westcott or both sank Argonaute at 15:31 with the loss of her entire crew of 43. A large amount of debris came to the surface after the sinking.

== Honors and awards ==
Under French Navy Order No. 146 SC/2 of 9 July 1943, the officers and crew of Argonaute received the following citation: "Fully committed to their vessel against vastly superior enemy forces during the events in North Africa in November 1942, [they] showed a total spirit of sacrifice, gloriously lost fighting."

By decree of 24 July 1944 (published in the Journal officiel de la République française of 1 August 1944), Argonaute′s final commanding officer, Lieutenant de Vaisseau Henri Véron, posthumously was named a Knight of the Legion of Honour. He also posthumously was awarded the Croix de Guerre 1939–1945 with palm.

== See also ==
- List of submarines of France
- French submarines of World War II
