= French submarine Sultane =

Two submarines of the French Navy have borne the name Sultane or La Sultane:

- French submarine La Sultane (Q177), an Argonaute-class submarine launched in 1932 and sold for scrap in 1946
- French submarine Sultane (1952), a British S-class submarine formerly HMS Statesman in French service from 1952 to 1959
