= French submarine Ondine (Q166) =

French Navy Orion-class submarine commissioned 1932

Ondine
History

France
- Name: Ondine
- Namesake: Undine, a category of elemental beings associated with water
- Builder: Chantiers Dubigeon, Nantes, France
- Laid down: 30 August 1929
- Launched: 4 May 1931
- Commissioned: 5 July 1932
- Fate: Seized by United Kingdom 3 July 1940; Cannibalized for spare parts; Stricken April 1943 or 26 March 1946 (see text); Scrapped

General characteristics
- Class & type: Orion-class submarine
- Displacement: 558 long tons (567 t) (surfaced); 787 long tons (800 t) (submerged)
- Length: 67 m (219 ft 10 in)
- Beam: 6.2 m (20 ft 4 in)
- Draught: 4.4 m (14 ft 5 in)
- Propulsion: 2 × Sulzer diesel engines, 1,400 hp (1,044 kW); 2 × electric motors, 1,000 hp (746 kW)
- Speed: 14 knots (26 km/h; 16 mph) (surfaced); 9 knots (17 km/h; 10 mph) (submerged)
- Range: 4,000 nautical miles (7,400 km; 4,600 mi) at 10 knots (19 km/h); 82 nautical miles (152 km; 94 mi) at 5 knots (9.3 km/h; 5.8 mph) (submerged)
- Test depth: 80 m (262 ft)
- Complement: 3 officers, 38 enlisted men
- Armament: 6 × 550 mm (21.7 in) torpedo tubes; 2 × 400 mm (15.7 in) torpedo tubes; 1 × 76 mm (3.0 in) M1 deck gun; 1 × 13.2 mm (0.52 in) machine gun; 2 × 8 mm (0.31 in) machine gun

Ondine (Q166) was a French Navy submarine commissioned in 1932. She served during World War II until she was seized by the United Kingdom in July 1940. She subsequently was cannibalized for spare parts, then stricken and scrapped.

== Design ==
With a length of 67 metres (219 ft 10 in), a beam of 6.2 metres (20 ft 4 in) and a draught of 4.4 metres (14 ft 5 in), Orion-class submarines could dive up to 80 m (262 ft). They had a surfaced displacement of 558 long tons (567 t) and a submerged displacement of 787 long tons (800 t). Propulsion while surfaced was provided by two Sulzer 1,400 horsepower (1,044 kW) diesel engines and while submerged by two 1,000 horsepower (746 kW) electric motors, allowing speeds of 14 knots (26 km/h; 16 mph) on the surface and 9 knots (17 km/h; 10 mph) while submerged. Their range was 4,000 nautical miles (7,400 km; 4,600 mi) at 10 knots (19 km/h; 12 mph) on the surface and 82 nautical miles (152 km) at 5 knots (9.3 km/h) submerged.

Orion-class submarines had six 550 mm (21.7 in) and two 400 mm (15.7 in) torpedo tubes. Three of the 550-millimetre tubs were in the bow and two more in a forward external rotating turret, and an after external rotating turret housed the sixth 550-millimetre tub and the two 400-millimetre tubes. Each submarine also had a 76 mm (3.0 in) M1 deck gun, a 13.2 millimetres (0.52 in) machine gun and two 8 millimetres (0.31 in) machine guns.

Orion-class submarines had a crew of three officers and 38 enlisted men.

== Construction and commissioning ==
Ondine, the second French submarine of the name, was ordered as part of the 1928 naval program. Her laid down on 30 August 1929 by Chantiers Dubigeon in Nantes, France. She was launched on 4 May 1931 and commissioned at Brest, France, on 5 July 1932 with the pennant number Q166.

== Service history ==
When World War II began on 1 September 1939 with the German invasion of Poland, Ondine was part of the 12th Submarine Division in the 2nd Submarine Squadron in the 6th Squadron based at Oran in Algeria. France entered the war on the side of the Allies on 3 September 1939. In 1939, Ondine departed moved to Toulon, France, and began patrols in the Atlantic Ocean off the Canary Islands. In 1940, she began a refit at Cherbourg, France.

German ground forces advanced into France, the Netherlands, Belgium, and Luxembourg on 10 May 1940, beginning the Battle of France. Italy declared war on France on 10 June 1940 and joined the invasion. As German ground forces approached Cherbourg, Ondine — whose diesel engines had been removed and whose batteries were ashore — was towed to England on 18 June 1940. The Battle of France ended in France's defeat and armistices with Germany on 22 June 1940 and with Italy on 24 June. When both armistices went into effect on 25 June 1940, Ondine was at Portsmouth, England.

After the French surrender, French Navy forces came under the control of Vichy France. To prevent French ships from falling under Axis control, the British conducted Operation Catapult — an effort to seize or disable French Navy ships — on 3 July 1940. Ondine had only a few men aboard that day to maintain security, and the British seized her without resistance. During July and August 1940, her officers joined the forces of Free France. Her enlisted personnel also joined the Free French Naval Forces and were dispersed among various ships.

Ondine was never seaworthy again. To keep the Free French Naval Forces submarines Junon and Minerve operational, she was cannibalized for spare parts. She was stricken from the navy list either in April 1943 or on 26 March 1946, according to different sources, and scrapped.

== Notable crew members ==
- Georges Rossignol (1911–1942), Companion of the Liberation.
