= Canale-di-Verde =

- Commune
- Location of Canale-di-Verde
- Location within France Location within Corsica
- Coordinates: 42°16′31″N 9°28′26″E
- Country: France
- Region: Corsica
- Department: Haute-Corse
- Arrondissement: Corte
- Canton: Castagniccia

Government
  - Mayor (2020–2026): Jean-Charles Castellani
- Area^{1}: 15 km^{2} (5.8 sq mi)
- Elevation: 440 m (1,440 ft)
- Highest elevation: 1,093 m (3,586 ft)
- Lowest elevation: 0 m (0 ft)
- Population (2023): 302
  - Density: 20/km^{2} (52/sq mi)
- Time zone: UTC+01:00 (CET)
  - Summer (DST): UTC+02:00 (CEST)
- INSEE/Postal code: 2B057 /20230
- ^{1} French Land Register data, which excludes lakes, ponds, glaciers > 1 km^{2} (0.386 sq mi or 247 acres) and river estuaries.

Canale-di-Verde (French form) or Canale di Verde (Italian: [kaˈnaːle di ˈverde], Corsican: [kaˈnale di ˈbɛrde]) is a commune in the French department of Haute-Corse, collectivity and island of Corsica.

== Administration ==
Since 2015, Canale-di-Verde is part of the canton of Castagniccia, together with 36 other communes.

== Geography ==
Canale di Verde is 19 kilometres (12 mi) to the east of Moïta, but 5 kilometres (3 mi) as the crow flies, on an escarpment hanging over the Plaine Orientale. The commune, which culminates at la punta di a Campana, extends between the sea on the one hand and the torrent of Allistro on the other, at the mouth of which is found a ruined Genoese tower of the same name. The reservoir of Peri there is used to irrigate 26 hectares (64 acres) of vines.

== Population ==
Historical population
Year	Pop.	±% p.a.
1968	215	—
1975	330	+6.31%
1982	356	+1.09%
1990	275	−3.18%
1999	335	+2.22%
2007	330	−0.19%
2012	355	+1.47%
2017	321	−1.99%
2023	302	−1.01%
Source: INSEE

== See also ==
- Communes of the Haute-Corse department
- Tour d'Alistro - a Genoese tower in the commune
