= French submarine Orion =

Orion
History

France
- Name: Orion
- Namesake: Orion, a giant huntsman in Greek mythology
- Ordered: December 1927
- Builder: Ateliers et Chantiers de la Loire, Nantes, France
- Laid down: 9 July 1929
- Launched: 21 April 1931
- Commissioned: 5 July 1932
- Fate: Seized by United Kingdom 3 July 1940; Cannibalized for spare parts; Stricken April 1943 or 26 March 1946 (see text); Scrapped

General characteristics
- Class & type: Orion-class submarine
- Displacement: 558 long tons (567 t) (surfaced); 787 long tons (800 t) (submerged)
- Length: 67 m (219 ft 10 in)
- Beam: 6.2 m (20 ft 4 in)
- Draught: 4.4 m (14 ft 5 in)
- Propulsion: 2 × Sulzer diesel engines, 1,400 hp (1,044 kW); 2 × electric motors, 1,000 hp (746 kW)
- Speed: 14 knots (26 km/h; 16 mph) (surfaced); 9 knots (17 km/h; 10 mph) (submerged)
- Range: 4,000 nautical miles (7,400 km; 4,600 mi) at 10 knots (19 km/h; 12 mph); 82 nautical miles (152 km; 94 mi) at 5 knots (9.3 km/h; 5.8 mph) (submerged)
- Test depth: 80 m (262 ft)
- Complement: 3 officers, 38 enlisted men
- Armament: 6 × 550 mm (21.7 in) torpedo tubes; 2 × 400 mm (15.7 in) torpedo tubes; 1 × 76 mm (3.0 in) gun M1; 1 × 13.2 mm (0.52 in) machine gun; 2 × 8 mm (0.31 in) machine gun

Orion (Q165) was a French Navy submarine commissioned in 1932. She served during World War II until she was seized by the United Kingdom in July 1940. She subsequently was cannibalized for spare parts, then stricken and scrapped.

== Design ==
With a length of 67 metres (219 ft 10 in), a beam of 6.2 metres (20 ft 4 in) and a draught of 4.4 metres (14 ft 5 in), Orion-class submarines could dive up to 80 m (262 ft). They had a surfaced displacement of 558 long tons (567 t) and a submerged displacement of 787 long tons (800 t). Propulsion while surfaced was provided by two Sulzer 1,400 horsepower (1,044 kW) diesel engines and while submerged by two 1,000 horsepower (746 kW) electric motors, allowing speeds of 14 knots (26 km/h; 16 mph) on the surface and 9 knots (17 km/h; 10 mph) while submerged. Their range was 4,000 nautical miles (7,400 km; 4,600 mi) at 10 knots (19 km/h; 12 mph) on the surface and 82 nautical miles (152 km) at 5 knots (9.3 km/h) submerged.

Orion-class submarines had six 550 mm (21.7 in) and two 400 mm (15.7 in) torpedo tubes. Three of the 550-millimetre tubs were in the bow and two more in a forward external rotating turret, and an after external rotating turret housed the sixth 550-millimetre tub and the two 400-millimetre tubes. Each submarine also had a 76 mm (3.0 in) M1 deck gun, a 13.2 millimetres (0.52 in) machine gun and two 8 millimetres (0.31 in) machine guns.

Orion-class submarines had a crew of three officers and 38 enlisted men.

== Construction and commissioning ==
Orion was ordered in December 1927 as part of the 1928 naval program. Her laid down on 9 July 1929 by Ateliers et Chantiers de la Loire in Nantes, France. She was launched on 21 April 1931 and commissioned at Brest, France, on 5 July 1932 with the pennant number Q165.

== Service history ==
When World War II began on 1 September 1939 with the German invasion of Poland, Orion was part of the 12th Submarine Division in the 2nd Submarine Squadron in the 6th Squadron at Oran in Algeria. France entered the war on the side of the Allies on 3 September 1939. In October 1939, Orion moved to Casablanca in French Morocco, from which she conducted patrols in the Atlantic Ocean off the Canary Islands. On 4 March 1940, Orion sustained a cracked cylinder in one of her diesel engines, forcing her to proceed to Cherbourg, France, for repairs which were not expected to be completed until 1 September 1940. At Cherbourg, her diesel engines were dismantled and her batteries were removed, .

German ground forces advanced into France, the Netherlands, Belgium, and Luxembourg on 10 May 1940, beginning the Battle of France. Italy declared war on France on 10 June 1940 and joined the invasion. As German ground forces approached Cherbourg, Orion — which still had no engine — was taken under tow by a Belgian tug which towed her England, first to Southampton on 18 June 1940 and then on 20 June to Portsmouth. The Battle of France ended in France's defeat and armistices with Germany on 22 June 1940 and with Italy on 24 June. When both armistices went into effect on 25 June 1940, Orion was at Portsmouth.

After the French surrender, French Navy forces came under the control of Vichy France. To prevent French ships from falling under Axis control, the British conducted Operation Catapult — an effort to seize or disable French Navy ships — on 3 July 1940. Orion had only two members of her crew aboard that day, and the British seized her without resistance. Disapproving of the desire of some of her crew to join the Free French Naval Forces, Orion′s commanding officer ordered her second-in-command to set an example for them by returning to France to serve the Vichy regime. Several days later, the second-in-command committed suicide on 25 July 1940 because of stress he experienced over the confrontation between the pro-Vichy and pro-Free France factions of the crew.

Orion was never seaworthy again. To keep the Free French Naval Forces submarines Junon and Minerve operational, she was cannibalized for spare parts. Her crew members moved to the Free French Naval Forces sloop Commandant Dominé, which the British also had seized from the French Navy.

Orion was stricken from the navy list either in April 1943 or on 26 March 1946, according to different sources, and scrapped.
