= Minerve-class submarine =

Class of French diesel submarine in World War II

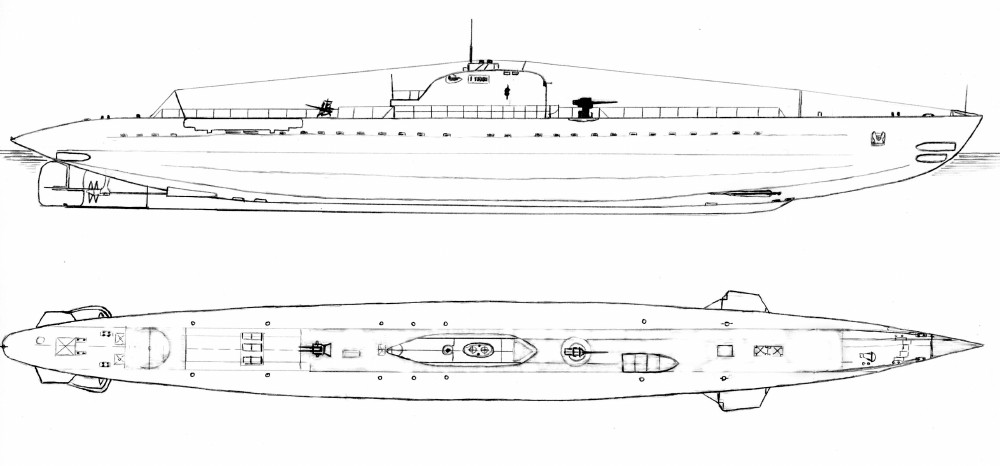

Class overview
- Name: Minerve class
- Builders: Ateliers et Chantiers Dubigeon, Nantes; Arsenal de Cherbourg, Cherbourg; Chantiers Worms, Rouen; Chantiers et Ateliers Augustin Normand, Le Havre
- Operators: French Navy; Free French Naval Forces
- Preceded by: Argonaute class
- Succeeded by: Aurore class
- Built: 1931–1938
- In commission: 1936–1954
- Completed: 6
- Lost: 1
- Retired: 2
- Scrapped: 3 (scuttled)

General characteristics
- Type: Submarine
- Displacement: 662 long tons (673 t) surfaced; 856 long tons (870 t) submerged
- Length: 68.1 m (223 ft 5 in)
- Beam: 5.6 m (18 ft 4 in)
- Draught: 4 m (13 ft 1 in)
- Propulsion: 2 × Vickers-Normand diesel engines, 1,800 bhp (1,342 kW); 2 × Electric motors, 1,230 shp (917 kW)
- Speed: 14.2 knots (26.3 km/h; 16.3 mph) surfaced; 9 knots (17 km/h; 10 mph) submerged
- Range: 2,000 nmi (3,700 km; 2,300 mi) at 10 knots (19 km/h; 12 mph) surfaced; 85 nmi (157 km; 98 mi) at 5 knots (9.3 km/h; 5.8 mph) submerged
- Test depth: 80 m (260 ft)
- Complement: 42
- Armament: 1 × 75 mm (3 in)/35 Model 1928 deck gun with 150 rounds; 2 × 13.2 mm (0.52 in) AA machine guns; 6 × 550 mm (21.7 in) internal torpedo tubes (4 bow/2 stern) with 12 torpedoes; 3 × 400 mm (15.7 in) external torpedo tubes

Minerve-class submarines were a class of submarine built for the French Navy prior to World War II.

The class were based on the French Admiralty 630 series design, but with more power and better armament. The class had six internal 550 mm torpedo tubes (four in the bow and two in the stern) and three 400 mm tubes mounted externally on a moveable triple mount.

Minerve and Junon were seized by the British in July 1940, following the battle of France, and handed over to the Free French Forces in September the same year, and served throughout the war. Minerve was wrecked off Chesil Beach in September 1945, while Junon returned to France and served until 1954.

The other four boats remained under Vichy control until November 1942 when, following the German occupation, Pallas and Cérès were scuttled at Oran, and Vénus scuttled at Toulon, while Iris sailed for the neutral port of Cartagena, and was interned there until after the end of the war. She was returned to France in November 1945, and remained in service until 1950.

== Submarines of the class ==
- Minerve (1934) (Q185)

Built : Arsenal de Cherbourg, Cherbourg
Laid down : 17 August 1931
Launched : 23 October 1934
Commissioned : 15 September 1936
Fate : Wrecked, 19 September 1945

- Junon (1935) (Q186)

Built : Chantiers et Ateliers Normand, Le Havre
Laid down : 9 June 1932
Launched : 15 September 1935
Commissioned : 20 September 1937
Decommissioned : 6 December 1954
Fate : Scrapped, 1960

- Vénus (Q187)

Built : Chantiers Worms, Rouen
Laid down : 27 June 1932
Launched : 6 April 1935
Commissioned : 15 November 1936
Fate : Scuttled at Toulon, 27 November 1942

- Iris (1934) (Q188)

Built : Ateliers et Chantiers Dubigeon, Nantes
Laid down : 1 July 1932
Launched : 23 September 1934
Commissioned : 15 September 1936
Fate : Struck, 1 February 1950

- Pallas (1938) (Q189)

Built : Chantiers et Ateliers Normand, Le Havre
Laid down : 19 October 1936
Launched : 25 August 1938
Commissioned : 12 June 1939
Fate : Scuttled at Oran, 9 November 1942

- Cérès (1938) (Q190)

Built : Chantiers Worms, Rouen
Laid down : 8 August 1936
Launched : 9 December 1938
Commissioned : 15 July 1939
Fate : Scuttled at Oran, 9 November 1942

== See also ==
- List of submarines of France
- French submarines of World War II
