= Torra d'Alistru =

Genoese coastal defence tower in Corsica

Tower of Alistru
- Torra d'Alistru (Corsican)
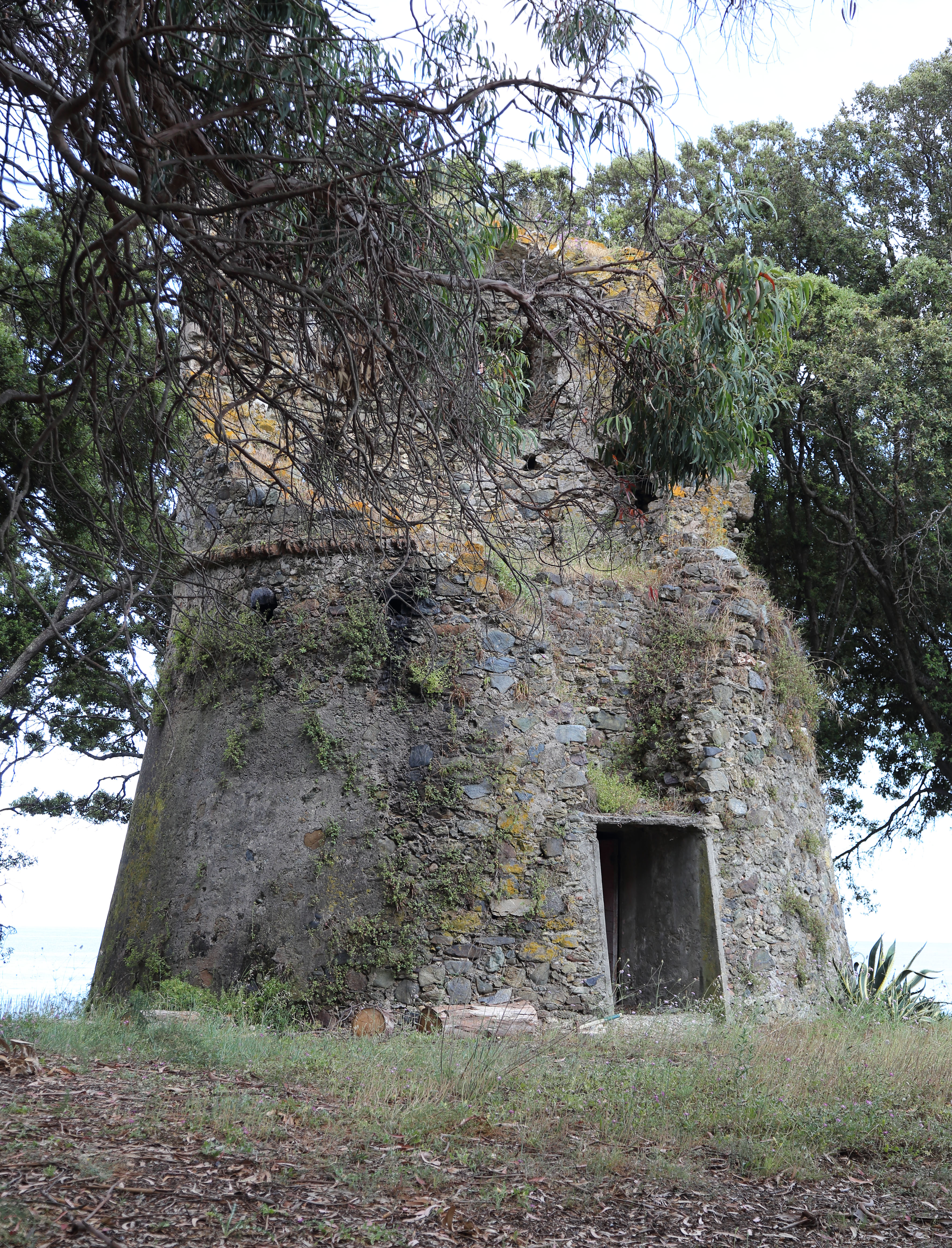

- Location within Corsica
- 42°15′1″N 9°33′15″E

History
- Built: Second half 16th century

The Tower of Alistru (Corsican: Torra d'Alistru) is a ruined Genoese tower located in the commune of Canale-di-Verde on the east coast of the Corsica.

The tower was built in the second half of the 16th century. It was one of a series of coastal defences constructed by the Republic of Genoa between 1530 and 1620 to stem the attacks by Barbary pirates. The tower is at the mouth of the Alistro river.

== See also ==
- List of Genoese towers in Corsica
