= French submarine Naïade (Q124) =

French submarine

Naïade
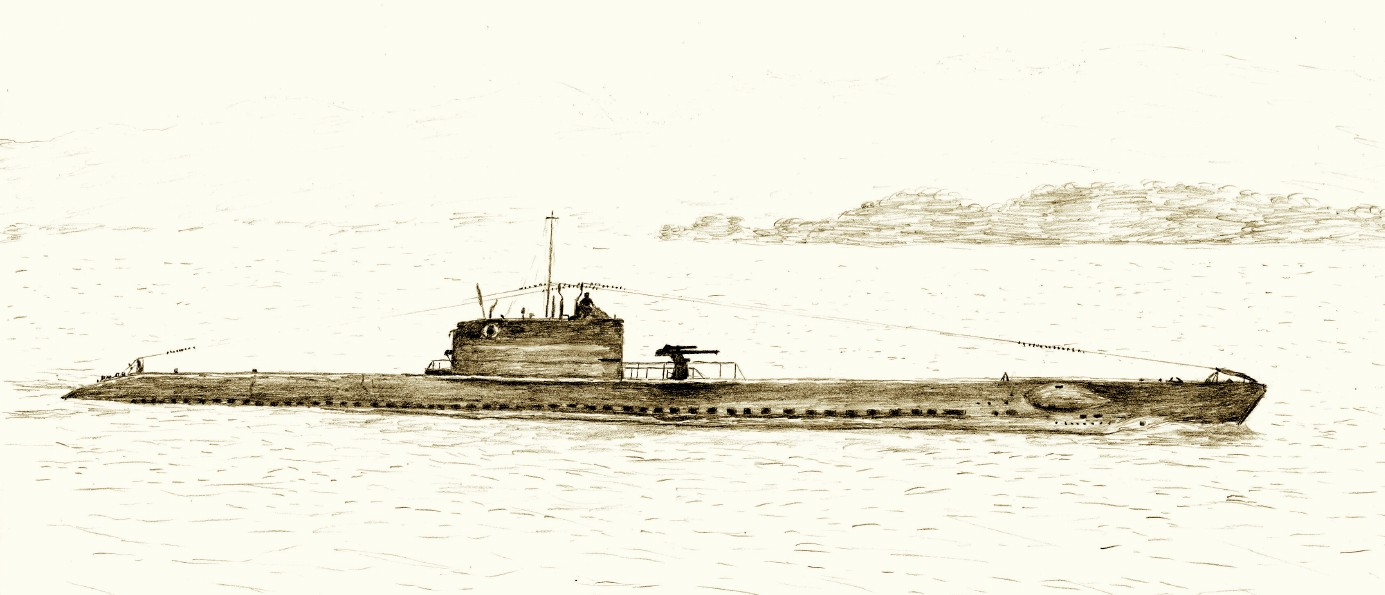
- Naïade′s sister ship Sirène

History

France
- Name: Naïade
- Namesake: Naiad, a type of female spirit, or nymph, presiding over fountains, wells, springs, streams, brooks and other bodies of fresh water in Greek mythology
- Builder: Ateliers et Chantiers de la Loire, Saint-Nazaire, France
- Laid down: 28 November 1923
- Launched: 20 October 1925
- Commissioned: 6 May 1927
- Fate: Scuttled 27 November 1942; Seized by Germany; Transferred to Italy; Refloated 13 March 1943; Sunk 17 April 1943; Refloated 17 July 1943; Seized by Germany September 1943; Sunk 24 November 1943; Refloated 1945; Scrapped

General characteristics
- Class & type: Sirène-class submarine
- Displacement: 609 long tons (619 t) surfaced; 757 long tons (769 t) submerged
- Length: 64 m (210 ft 0 in)
- Beam: 5.2 m (17 ft 1 in)
- Draught: 4.3 m (14 ft 1 in)
- Speed: 13.5 knots (25.0 km/h; 15.5 mph) surfaced; 7.5 knots (13.9 km/h; 8.6 mph) submerged
- Range: 3,500 nmi (6,500 km; 4,000 mi) at 7.5 kn (13.9 km/h; 8.6 mph)
- Complement: 41
- Armament: 7 × 550 mm (22 in) torpedo tubes; 1 × 75 mm (3 in) deck gun; 2 × 8 mm (0.31 in) machine guns

Naïade (Q124) was a French Navy Sirène-class submarine commissioned in 1927. She participated in World War II, first on the side of the Allies from 1939 to June 1940, then in the navy of Vichy France. She was scuttled in November 1942.

== Characteristics ==
The Sirène-class submarines had a displacement of 609 long tons (619 t) surfaced and 757 long tons (769 t) submerged. They had an endurance of 3,500 nautical miles (6,500 km; 4,000 mi) at 7.5 knots (13.9 km/h; 8.6 mph), with a maximum surface speed of 13.5 knots (25.0 km/h; 15.5 mph), and a submerged speed of 7.5 knots (13.9 km/h; 8.6 mph). Their armament was seven torpedo tubes (three forward, two amidships, and two aft) and carried 13 torpedoes. As with all French submarines of this period, the midships torpedo tubes were fitted externally in trainable mounts. The submarines had a single 75 mm (3 in) and two 8 mm machine guns. Submarines of the Sirène class were manned by crews of 41 men.

== Construction and commissioning ==
Laid down at Ateliers et Chantiers de la Loire in Saint-Nazaire, France, on 28 November 1923 with the pennant number Q124, Naïade was launched on 20 October 1925. She ran her official trials on 7 June 1926 and was commissioned on 6 May 1927.

== Service history ==
=== French Navy ===
In the years before World War II, three of Naïade's crewmen disappeared while she was at sea. The first two disappeared on 30 March 1929 and the third on 21 May 1935.

World War II began with the German invasion of Poland on 1 September 1939, and when France entered the war on 3 September, Sirène was a unit of the 19th Submarine Division at Toulon, France, with the submarines Sirène, Galatée, and Argonaute. With the outbreak of war, the division was placed under the command of the maritime prefect of the 3rd Region. French naval forces at Toulon primarily were concerned with opposing Italian forces in the event that Italy entered the war on Germany's side.

The Battle of France began when German ground forces advanced into France, the Netherlands, Belgium, and Luxembourg on 10 May 1940. Italy declared war on France on 10 June 1940 and joined the invasion of France that day. The Battle of France ended in France's defeat and armistice with Germany and Italy, which went into effect on 25 June 1940 while Naïade was at Toulon.

=== Vichy France ===
After the armistice went into effect, Naïade became part of the naval forces of Vichy France, but was disarmed and placed under guard at Toulon under the terms of the armistice. The 19th Submarine Division was dissolved on 1 September 1940. Its submarines were integrated into the 5th Squadron of the 1st Submarine Force. Unable get underway when Germany and Italy occupied the Free Zone (French: Zone libre) of Vichy France on 27 November 1942, Naïade was among the French vessels scuttled at Toulon to prevent their seizure by Germany when German forces entered Toulon that day.

== Final disposition ==
The Germans seized Naïade and handed her over to the Italians, who refloated her on 13 March 1943. She was sunk in a United States Army Air Forces raid on 17 April 1943. The Italians again refloated her on 17 July 1943.

After Italy surrendered to the Allies in September 1943, the Germans took control of Naïade. She was sunk again in a U.S. Army Air Forces raid on the Toulon arsenal on 24 November 1943. At the beginning of December 1943, the Germans decided to scrap her. She was refloated in 1945 and subsequently scrapped.

== See also ==
- List of submarines of France
- French submarines of World War II
