= French 600 Series submarines =

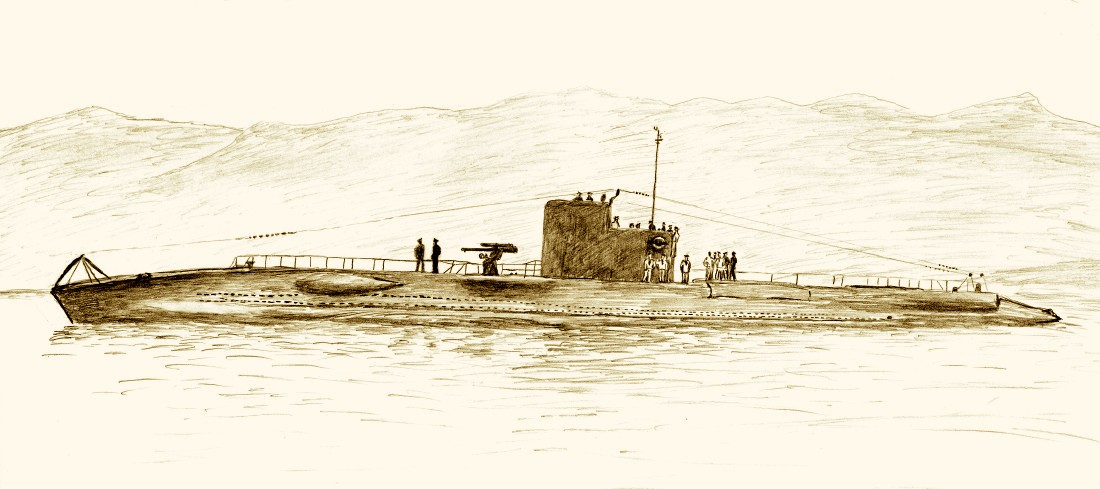
- Doris of the Circé class

Class overview
- Name: 600 Series
- Operators: French Navy
- Subclasses: (600 series): Sirène class; Ariane class; Circé class; (630 series) : Orion class; Diane class; Argonaute class
- Built: 1923–1933
- In commission: 1927–1945
- Completed: 28
- Lost: 18
- Retired: 10

General characteristics
- Type: Submarine
- Displacement: 609–651 tonnes (599–641 long tons) surfaced; 757–822 tonnes (745–809 long tons) submerged
- Length: 62.4–65.9 m (204 ft 9 in – 216 ft 2 in)
- Beam: 4.9–5.4 m (16 ft 1 in – 17 ft 9 in)
- Draught: 6.0–4.3 m (19 ft 8 in – 14 ft 1 in)
- Propulsion: 2 × diesel 1,200–1,420 hp (0.89–1.06 MW); 2 × electric 1,000 hp (0.75 MW)
- Speed: 13.5–14 knots (25.0–25.9 km/h; 15.5–16.1 mph) surfaced; 7.5–9 knots (13.9–16.7 km/h; 8.6–10.4 mph) submerged
- Range: 3,500–4,000 nmi (6,500–7,400 km) surfaced; 75–82 nmi (139–152 km) submerged
- Complement: 41
- Armament: 7 × 550 mm (22 in) torpedo tubes; 1 × 75–100 mm (3.0–3.9 in) deck gun; 1 × twin 8 mm (0.31 in) machine guns

The French 600 Series submarines were a series of submarine classes built for the French Navy (Marine Nationale) during the Inter war years.

== Development ==
The 600 Series were seagoing submarines, though designated as coastal-type submarines, built for service in the Mediterranean Sea. They were built to conform to the interwar naval treaties arising from the 1922 Washington and 1930 London conferences, which placed restrictions on the number and size of warships of various types that nations could build. The coastal submarine was limited to a 600-ton surface displacement, though there was no limit placed on the numbers of these vessels that could be built. During this period France was involved in a rivalry with Italy in the Mediterranean, leading to a naval arms race. France took an early lead, but later Italian submarine construction had overtaken that of France.

The French 600 series, and the later 630 series, was equivalent to the Italian 600 Series, the British S class, and the German Type VII U-boat.

== General characteristics ==
The 600s had a surface displacement just above 600 tons; the earliest vessels displaced 609 tons while the last built were 651 tons. They had an endurance of 3,500 to 4,000 nautical miles (6,500 to 7,400 km; 4,000 to 4,600 mi) at 7.5 to 10 knots (13.9 to 18.5 km/h; 8.6 to 11.5 mph), with a submerged speed of 7.5 to 9 knots (13.9 to 16.7 km/h; 8.6 to 10.4 mph). Their armament was six to seven torpedo tubes (three forward, two midships, and one or two aft) with an outfit of 9–13 torpedoes. As with all French submarines of this period, the midships torpedo tubes were fitted externally in trainable mounts. They had a single 75 mm (3 in) to 3.9 in (99 mm) gun, and one to two 8 mm machine guns, and were manned by crews of 41 officers and enlisted.

== Construction history ==
The first 600s were ordered in 1923. The French Navy was content to leave the design features for the boats to the builders, after laying down the specifications. Thus the 12 boats of the series were in three distinct classes, according to the design bureau and shipyard. The subsequent 630 Series were designed and built in the same way, resulting in 16 boats in a further three classes.

- Sirène class: a class of four submarines, built to a Loire-Simonot design. They were ordered in 1925 and completed in 1927.
- Ariane class: a class of four submarines, built to a Normand-Fenaux design. They were ordered in 1923 and completed in 1929–30.
- Circé class: a class of four submarines, built to a Schneider-Laubeuf design. They were ordered in 1923 and completed in 1928–29.
- Orion class: a class of two submarines, built to a Loire-Simonot design. They were ordered in 1928 and completed in 1932.
- Diane class: a class of nine submarines, built to a Normand-Fenaux design. They were ordered in 1927 and completed in 1932–33.
- Argonaute class: a class of five submarines, built to a Schneider-Laubeuf design. They were ordered in 1927 and completed in 1932–35.

The 600/630 Series was succeeded by the Minerve class, an Admiralty design based on the 630 specification, and which sought to increase standardization.

== War service ==
The 600/630 Series submarines served with the Marine Nationale and with the Free French during World War II in a full range of front-line duties and missions. Of the 26 boats that served in World War II (two were lost in the pre-war period) 17 were lost.

== Bibliography ==
- Bagnasco, E (1977). Submarines of World War Two. Arms and Armour Press. ISBN 0-85368-331-X.
- Chesneau, Roger, ed. (1980). Conway's All the World's Fighting Ships 1922–1946. Greenwich, UK: Conway Maritime Press. ISBN 0-85177-146-7.
