= HMS Westcott =

Destroyer of the Royal Navy

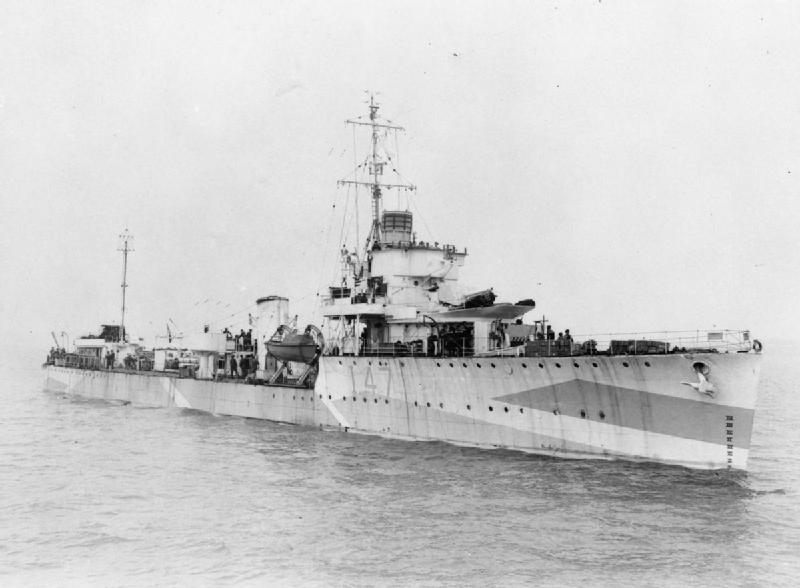
- Westcott during World War II

History

United Kingdom
- Name: HMS Westcott
- Ordered: December 1916
- Builder: Denny
- Laid down: 30 March 1917
- Launched: 14 February 1918
- Commissioned: 12 April 1918
- Decommissioned: 26 June 1945
- Refit: Converted to long-range escort, 1943
- Fate: Sold to BISCO and scrapped, 1946

General characteristics
- Class & type: Admiralty W-class destroyer
- Displacement: 1,100 tons
- Length: 312 ft (95.1 m) length overall; 300 ft (91.4 m) between perpendiculars
- Beam: 29 ft 6 in (9.0 m)
- Draught: 9 ft (2.7 m) standard; 13 ft 11 in (4.2 m) maximum
- Propulsion: 3 Yarrow type Water-tube boilers; Brown-Curtis steam turbines; 2 shafts; 27,000 shp (20,000 kW)
- Speed: 34 knots (63 km/h)
- Range: 320-370 tons oil, 3,500 nmi (6,500 km) at 15 knots (28 km/h), 900 nmi (1,700 km) at 32 knots (59 km/h)
- Complement: 110
- Armament: 4 × QF 4-inch (102 mm) Mk V guns, mount P Mk.I; 2 × QF 2-pounder (40 mm) MkII "pom-pom" AA guns or; 1 × QF 3-inch (76 mm) AA gun HA Mk.II; 6 (2x3) tubes for 21-inch (533 mm) torpedoes

HMS Westcott (D47) was a Royal Navy Admiralty W-class destroyer that served in the Second World War. In the Second World War Westcott served in an anti-submarine role and escorted numerous Atlantic and Malta convoys.

== Construction and design ==
On 9 December 1916, the British Admiralty placed an order for 21 large destroyers based on the V class, which became the Admiralty W class. Of these destroyers, two, Westcott and Walker were ordered from the Scottish shipbuilders William Denny and Brothers.

Westcott was 312 feet (95.1 m) long overall and 300 feet (91.4 m) between perpendiculars, with a beam of 26 feet 6 inches (8.08 m) and a draught of between 10 feet 9 inches (3.28 m) and 11 feet 11 1/2 inches (3.64 m) depending on load. Displacement was 1,100 long tons (1,100 t) standard, and up to 1,490 long tons (1,510 t) deep load. Three oil-fed Yarrow boilers raising steam at 250 pounds per square inch (1,700 kPa) fed Brown-Curtis geared steam turbines which developed 27,000 shaft horsepower (20,000 kW), driving two screws for a maximum designed speed of 34 knots (63 km/h; 39 mph). The ship carried 368 long tons (374 t) of oil giving a range of 3,500 nautical miles (6,500 km; 4,000 mi) at 15 knots (28 km/h; 17 mph).

Westcott's main gun armament consisted of four 4-inch Mk V QF guns in four single mounts on the ship's centerline. These were disposed as two forward and two aft in superimposed firing positions. A single QF 3-inch (76 mm) 20 cwt (Note: "Cwt" is the abbreviation for hundredweight, 20 cwt referring to the weight of the gun.) anti-aircraft gun was mounted aft of the second funnel. Aft of the 3-inch gun, she carried six 21-inch torpedo tubes mounted in two triple mounts on the center-line.

Westcott was laid down at Denny's Dumbarton, Scotland shipyard on 30 March 1917, and was launched on 14 February 1918. She was commissioned on 2 April and completed on 12 April. She was named after Captain George Blagdon Westcott, who was killed at the Battle of the Nile.

== Service ==
On commissioning, Westcott joined the 13th Destroyer Flotilla of the Grand Fleet, based at Rosyth in support of the Battlecruiser Force, remaining there for the remainder of the war. In 1919, the Grand Fleet was disbanded, and the Atlantic Fleet took its place, supported by four destroyer flotillas. Westcott joined the Second Destroyer Flotilla, based at Rosyth. In August 1919, the Second Destroyer Flotilla, including Westcott, was deployed to the Baltic as part of the British intervention in the Russian Civil War, relieving the First Destroyer Flotilla. The Second Flotilla remained in the Baltic until December 1919. In February 1920, Westcott was deployed to the Mediterranean, shelling Turkish forces during the Greco-Turkish War, before returning to Britain in August.

In 1921, as large flotillas of sixteen destroyers had proved difficult to control, it was decided to reorganise the destroyers of the Atlantic Fleet, changing to six flotillas each comprising a Flotilla leader and eight destroyers. Westcott was assigned to the Sixth Flotilla. Westcott was refitted at Sheerness from July 1930 to March 1931, having her boilers retubed. At some stage prior to 1931, the 3-inch gun was replaced by a 2-pounder "pom-pom". On 4 January 1933, she stood by the French Ocean liner L'Atlantique after the liner caught fire in the English Channel and was abandoned by her crew. Wescott remained with the Atlantic Fleet (and after 1932 the Home Fleet) until April 1935 when she was reduced to reserve at Devonport.

She returned to active service with the 21st Destroyer Flotilla in September 1935 as a result of the Abyssinia Crisis. On 18 March 1936, Westcott suffered an accidental explosion when on exercise in the Mediterranean. One man was killed, with a further 10 injured. In April 1936 she returned to reserve at Devonport. Westcott was then refitted in preparation for duty with the Fourth Submarine Flotilla based on the China Station. One 4-inch gun and the aft set of torpedo tubes was replaced by a crane for retrieval of practice torpedoes fired by the submarines of her flotilla, and sonar was fitted.

=== Second World War ===
On the outbreak of the Second World War, Westcott was still allocated to the Fourth Submarine Flotilla, and was having her armament restored to suit her for full operational service. In January 1940, Westcott was assigned to the Mediterranean Fleet, reaching Malta on 14 February. In April 1940, she was recalled to British waters, reaching Devonport on 19 April. She was then assigned to operations off Norway as a response to the German invasion, taking part in the evacuation of British troops from Åndalsnes on the night of 30 April/1 May, and continuing to operate off Norway for the rest of the month. In early June 1940 Westcott took part in the escort of a convoy (including the liners Empress of Britain, Aquitania, Mauretania, Queen Mary and Empress of Canada) carrying Australian troops to the United Kingdom, on the leg from Gibraltar to Britain. Westcott then took part in Operation Aerial, the evacuation from ports in Western France of Allied troops who had remained in France following the evacuations from Dunkirk and Le Havre. Westcott was sent to Brest, but collided with the coaster Nyroca on 17 June, with both ships returning to the United Kingdom empty.

On 4 July, Westcott joined the 4th Destroyer Flotilla, based at Devonport for escort duties in the North Atlantic. On 5 July, the destroyer Whirlwind was detached from Convoy OB178 to investigate a possible submarine sighting. While hunting the submarine, U-34, Whirlwind was torpedoed, blowing off the destroyer's bow. Westcott went to the aid of Whirlwind, rescuing the survivors of her crew and scuttling the stricken destroyer with torpedoes when it was realized that it would not stay afloat until rescue tugs would arrive. 57 of Whirlwind's crew were killed. On 2 September 1940, Westcott, with the destroyer HMCS Skeena, the sloops Lowestoft and Scarborough and the corvette Periwinkle, joined inbound Atlantic convoy SC.2 as escort. Over the next few days, the convoy was subject to a series of attacks by German U-boats which sank five of the 53 merchant ships of the convoy (four of them by U-47, commanded by Günther Prien). This was the first successful Wolfpack attack of the Second World War.

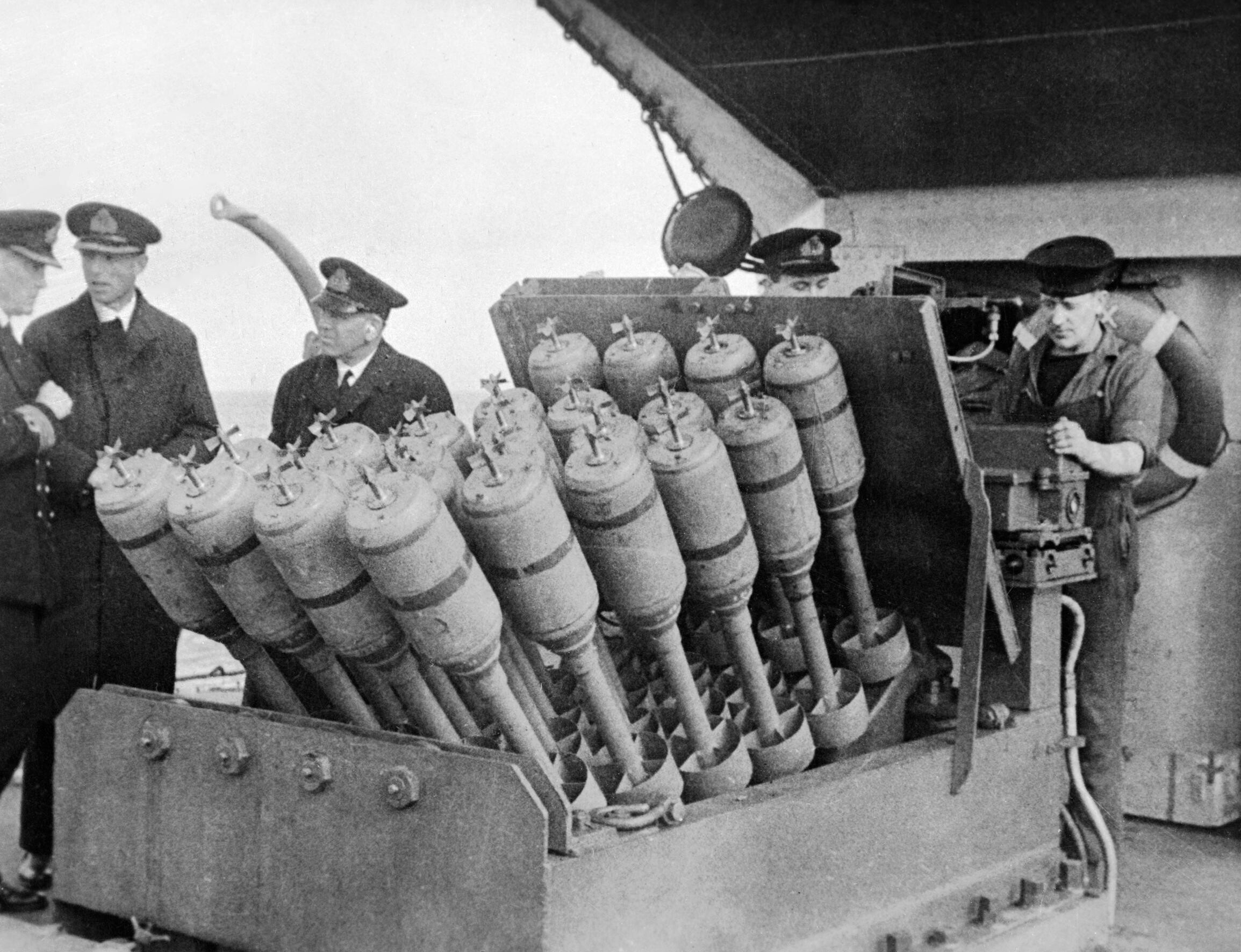
The Hedgehog anti-submarine mortar aboard Westcott, 28 November 1945. Westcott had operated the device since 1941.

In November 1940, Westcott transferred to the 5th Escort Group, based at Liverpool. On 16 January 1941, along with the Royal Navy tugs HMS Superman and HMS Tenacity, she rescued 143 survivors from SS Oropesa, which German submarine U-96 had torpedoed and sunk in the Western Approaches. On 28 January, Westcott collided with the corvette Bluebell, and after repair at Liverpool, which was slowed by German air raids, joined the 7th Escort Group, also based at Liverpool. Westcott was fitted with a prototype Hedgehog anti-submarine mortar, which replaced the forward 4-inch gun, in August 1941. As a test platform, Westcott became the first vessel to be equipped with Hedgehog. She remained part of the 7th Escort Group at the start of October 1941, and transferred to the Gibraltar Escort Group in December 1941, having her boiler tubes repaired from 24 December 1941 to 14 January 1942.

On 16 January 1942, the troopship MV Llangibby Castle was torpedoed and damaged by the German U-boat U-402, but managed to reach Horta in the Azores. After limited repairs, Llangibby Castle left Horta for Gibraltar on the night of 1/2 February, with three destroyers of the Gibraltar Escort group, Westcott, Croome and Exmoor allocated as escorts. Westcott and Croome patrolled off the south exit from Horta harbour while Exmoor escorted Llangibby Castle through the North exit. The German submarine U-581 was waiting off the south exit and attempted to torpedo the two destroyers, but a technical fault forced the submarine to the surface, when U-581 attempted to flee to neutral Portuguese waters. An initial attempt by Westcott to ram the submarine failed, but resulted in Westcott dropping a pattern of shallow-set depth charges all around U-581. Westcott came around for a second ramming attempt, which was successful, sinking the submarine, with 40 of U-581's crew being picked up by Westcott and Croome, with one swimming to shore and four killed.

On 19 April, Westcott formed part of the escort for the American aircraft carrier Wasp during Operation Calendar, an attempt to deliver vitally needed Spitfire fighters to Malta. 47 Spitfires were flown off Wasp on 20 April, with 46 reaching Malta. The Spitfires were quickly lost, however, and as a result another attempt was made to reinforce Malta's air defences, Operation Bowery. This time, Wasp was joined by the British carrier Eagle, with Westcott again part of the escort for the combined carrier force which met up off Gibraltar on the night of 7/8 May 1942, and flew off 64 Spitfires on 9 May, with 61 reaching Malta, managing to shore up the battered island's air defences. Westcott formed part of the escort for the carriers Eagle and Argus when they flew off 17 Spitfires on 18 May in Operation LB, and for two more delivery runs by Eagle on 3 June and 9 June.

On 11 June, Westcott joined the escort of a large supply convoy to Malta from the west, Operation Harpoon, with a second convoy, Operation Vigorous sailing simultaneously to Malta from Alexandria in Egypt. Both convoys came under heavy air attack, and on 14 June, the cruiser Liverpool was damaged by a torpedo dropped by an Italian aircraft. Westcott and the destroyer Antelope were detached from the convoy to escort Liverpool back to Gibraltar, with Antelope taking Liverpool under tow. The three ships came under continued Italian torpedo-bomber attacks after they had left the convoy, and on 16 April, Westcott was hit by anti-aircraft fire from Liverpool, killing three of her crew. The three ships made Gibraltar on 17 June. Two of the six merchant ships in the convoy managed to reach Malta, with two destroyers being sunk as well as four merchant ships. The parallel Operation Vigorous was a failure, being forced to turn back by the weight of Axis attacks. Westcott took part in two more Spitfire delivery runs by Eagle in July.

Malta was still short of supplies, and in August, another major convoy was run from Gibraltar, Operation Pedestal. The convoy left Gibraltar on 10 August, with Westcott part of the covering force of, including three aircraft carriers and two battleships, which was to escort the convoy to the Skerki Channel off Tunisia, leaving the remainder of the journey to a close escort of cruisers and destroyers. By the time the covering force, including Westcott, turned back on the evening of 12 August, the carrier Eagle had been sunk by a German submarine, and the carriers Indomitable and Victorious damaged by bombers. Five merchant ships out of fourteen, including the vital tanker SS Ohio, finally made Malta by 15 August.

In October 1942, Westcott escorted Furious on another fighter delivery mission. In November 1942, the Allies launched Operation Torch the Anglo-American invasion of French North Africa. Westcott formed part of the Centre Task Force, covering the landings at Oran in Algeria on 8 November. When the Vichy French submarines Actéon and Argonaute attempted to attack the Allied fleet, they were sunk by Westcott and Achates. (Note: Sources differ as to which destroyer sank which submarine. Blair says that Westcott sank Argonaute and Achates sank Actéon, while U-boat.net says that Westcott sank Actéon while Argonaute was sunk by both destroyers.) After Operation Torch, Westcott returned to the United Kingdom.

Following her return from the Mediterranean, Westcott was converted at Portsmouth Naval Dockyard to long-range escort configuration. This involved removing one boiler and its associated funnel, allowing additional oil bunkers to be fitted, extending the ship's range by as much as 600 nautical miles (1,100 km; 690 mi).

Withdrawn from service in June 1945, Westcott was sold to the British Iron & Steel Corporation (BISCO) to be scrapped the following year.

== Sources ==
- Barnett, Correlli (2000). Engage The Enemy More Closely. London: Penguin. ISBN 0-141-39008-5.
- Bennett, Geoffrey (2002). Freeing the Baltic. Edinburgh: Birlinn. ISBN 1-84341-001-X.
- Blair, Clay (2000a). Hitler's U-Boat War: The Hunters 1939–1942. London: Cassell & Co. ISBN 0-304-35260-8.
- Blair, Clay (2000b). Hitler's U-Boat War: The Hunted, 1942–1945. New York: Modern Library. ISBN 0-679-64033-9.
- Brown, D. K. (2007). Atlantic Escorts: Ships, Weapons & Tactics in World War II. Barnsley, UK: Seaforth Publishing. ISBN 978-1-84415-702-0.
- English, John (2019). Grand Fleet Destroyers: Part I: Flotilla Leaders and 'V/W' Class Destroyers. Windsor, UK: World Ship Society. ISBN 978-0-9650769-8-4.
- Friedman, Norman (2009). British Destroyers: From Earliest Days to the First World War. Barnsley, UK: Seaforth Publishing. ISBN 978-1-84832-049-9.
- Gardiner, Robert; Gray, Randal, eds. (1985). Conway's All the World's Fighting Ships 1906–1921. Conway. ISBN 0-85177-245-5.
- Ireland, Bernard (2003). Battle of the Atlantic. Leo Cooper. ISBN 1844150011.
- Lenton, H. T. (1970). British Fleet and Escort Destroyers: Volume One. London: Macdonald & Co. ISBN 0-356-02950-6.
- Preston, Antony (1971). 'V & W' Class Destroyers 1917–1945. London: Macdonald. OCLC 464542895.
- Manning, T.D. (1961). The British Destroyer. London: Putnam and Co.
- Morgan, Daniel; Taylor, Bruce (2011). U-boat Attack Logs: A Complete Record of Warship Sinkings from Original Sources 1939–1945. Barnsley, UK: Seaforth Publishing. ISBN 978-1-84832-118-2.
- Raven, Alan; Roberts, John (1979). 'V' and 'W' Class Destroyers. Man o' War. Vol. 2. London: Arms & Armour. ISBN 0-85368-233-X.
- Rohwer, Jürgen; Hümmelchen, Gerhard (1992). Chronology of the War at Sea 1939–1945. London: Greenhill Books. ISBN 1-85367-117-7.
- Ruegg, Bob; Hague, Arnold (1993). Convoys to Russia: 1941–1945. Kendal, UK: World Ship Society. ISBN 0-905617-66-5.
- Thomas, David Arthur (1987). A Companion to the Royal Navy. London: Harrap. ISBN 0245545727.
- Winser, John de D (1999). B.E.F. Ships Before, At and After Dunkirk. Gravesend: World Ship Society. ISBN 0-905617-91-6.
