= French submarine Nymphe =

French naval vessel (1927–1941)

Nymphe
History

France
- Name: Nymphe
- Namesake: Nymph, a female nature deity in Ancient Greek folklore
- Builder: Ateliers et Chantiers de la Loire, Saint-Nazaire, France
- Launched: 1 April 1926
- Commissioned: 8 June 1927
- Decommissioned: 1938
- Stricken: 1938
- Fate: Scrapped 1938 or ca. 25 June 1941

General characteristics
- Type: Submarine
- Displacement: 609 long tons (619 t) surfaced; 757 long tons (769 t) submerged
- Length: 64 m (210 ft 0 in)
- Beam: 5.2 m (17 ft 1 in)
- Draught: 4.3 m (14 ft 1 in)
- Speed: 13.5 knots (25.0 km/h; 15.5 mph) surfaced; 7.5 knots (13.9 km/h; 8.6 mph) submerged
- Range: 3,500 nmi (6,500 km) at 7.5 kn (13.9 km/h; 8.6 mph)
- Complement: 41
- Armament: 7 × 550 mm (22 in) torpedo tubes; 1 × 75 mm (3 in) deck gun; 2 × 8 mm (0.31 in) machine guns

Nymphe (Q133) was a French Navy Sirène-class submarine commissioned in 1927. She was decommissioned in 1938 and scrapped in 1941.

== Characteristics ==
The Sirène-class submarines had a displacement of 609 long tons (619 t) surfaced and 757 long tons (769 t) submerged. They had an endurance of 3,500 nautical miles (6,500 km; 4,000 mi) at 7.5 knots (13.9 km/h; 8.6 mph), with a maximum surface speed of 13.5 knots (25.0 km/h; 15.5 mph), and a submerged speed of 7.5 knots (13.9 km/h; 8.6 mph). Their armament was seven torpedo tubes (three forward, two amidships, and two aft) and carried 13 torpedoes. As with all French submarines of this period, the midships torpedo tubes were fitted externally in trainable mounts. The submarines had a single 75 mm (3 in) and two 8 mm machine guns, and were manned by crews of 41 men.

== Construction and commissioning ==
Nymphe was laid down in 1923 by Ateliers et Chantiers de la Loire at Saint-Nazaire, France. Launched on 1 April 1926 with the pennant number Q133, she was commissioned on 8 June 1927.

== Service history ==
Nymphe suffered serious damage in 1938; sources do not describe the nature or circumstances of the damage. Apparently deemed beyond economical repair, she was decommissioned and stricken that year. Various sources claim she was scrapped in 1938, and one source states that she was scrapped in 1941. One source states that 25 June 1941 was the date of her "withdrawal or loss" and another specifies that she was scrapped "on" 25 June 1941, without indicating whether that date represents the beginning or completion of the scrapping process.

== See also ==
- List of submarines of France
