= Orion-class submarine =

Class of French Mavy submarines

Class overview
- Name: Orion class
- Operators: French Navy
- Preceded by: Argonaute class
- Succeeded by: Diane class
- Built: 1928 - 1931
- In service: 1932 - 1943
- Planned: 2
- Completed: 2
- Retired: 2

General characteristics
- Type: Submarine
- Displacement: 558 long tons (567 t) (surfaced); 787 long tons (800 t) (submerged)
- Length: 67 m (219 ft 10 in)
- Beam: 6.2 m (20 ft 4 in)
- Draught: 4.4 m (14 ft 5 in)
- Propulsion: 2 × diesel engines, 1,400 hp (1,044 kW); 2 × electric motors, 1,000 hp (746 kW)
- Speed: 14 knots (26 km/h) (surfaced); 9 knots (17 km/h) (submerged)
- Range: 4,000 nautical miles (7,400 km) at 10 knots (19 km/h); 82 nautical miles (152 km) at 5 knots (9.3 km/h) (submerged)
- Test depth: 80 m (260 ft)
- Complement: 41 men
- Armament: 6 × 550 mm (21.7 in) torpedo tubes; 2 × 400 mm (15.7 in) torpedo tubes; 1 × 76 mm (3.0 in) gun M1; 1 × 13.2 mm (0.52 in) machine gun; 2 × 8 mm (0.31 in) machine gun

The Orion-class submarines were a class of two submarines built for the French Navy between 1928 and 1931.

== Design ==
The Orion-class submarines were ordered in 1928 to a Loire-Simonot design. 67 m (219 ft 10 in) long, with a beam of 6.2 m (20 ft 4 in) and a draught of 4.4 m (14 ft 5 in), they could dive up to 80 m (260 ft). The submarines had a surfaced displacement of 558 long tons (567 t) and a submerged displacement of 787 long tons (800 t). Propulsion while surfaced was provided by two diesel engines with a total of 1,400 hp (1,044 kW) and two electric motors with a total of 1,000 hp (746 kW). The submarines' electrical propulsion allowed it to attain speeds of 9 knots (17 km/h; 10 mph) while submerged and 14 knots (26 km/h; 16 mph) on the surface. Their surfaced range was 4,000 nautical miles (7,400 km) at 10 knots (19 km/h) with a submerged range of 82 nautical miles (152 km) at 5 knots (9.3 km/h).

== Ships ==
Orion-class submarines
Name	Ordered	laid down	launched	commissioned	fate
Orion	27 December 1927	9 July 1929	21 April 1931	5 July 1932	Scrapped for spare parts in 1944.
Ondine	27 December 1927	30 August 1929	4 May 1931	5 July 1932	Scrapped for spare parts in 1944.
