= Alistro =

Stream in the department of Haute-Corse, Corsica

- Location within Corsica Location within France

Location
- Country: France
- Region: Corsica
- Department: Haute-Corse

Physical characteristics
- Mouth: Tyrrhenian Sea
  - coordinates: 42.2523°N 9.5552°E

The Alistro (French pronunciation: [alistʁo]; Corsican: Alistru) is a small coastal river in the department of Haute-Corse, Corsica, France. It enters the Tyrrhenian Sea from the east of the island.

== Course ==
The Alistro is 11.8 kilometres (7.3 mi) long and flows through the communes of Canale-di-Verde and San-Giuliano. It rises in the commune of Canale-di-Verde to the northeast of the 1,093 metres (3,586 ft) Pointe de Campana. It flows east past the village of Canale-di-Verde, then southeast past the Peri Reservoir to enter the sea in the commune of San-Giuliano to the south of the village of Alistro. The D17 road follows most of its course. At its mouth the river crosses Alistro Beach, an unspoilt long and sandy beach with scattered lagoons. Behind it are small dunes with an important maquis shrubland. The Torra d'Alistru, a Genoese tower built in the second half of the 16th century, guarded the mouth of the Alistro from attacks by Barbary pirates. It is now ruined.

== Landscape ==
The Alistro is in the Plaines Orientales landscape. The coast is undeveloped to the north of the Alistro, while to the south it is more urbanized, with vacation villages and marinas. Edward Lear wrote of it in his Diary of an English Landscaper in Corsica (1868), "The beauty, the majesty of the great plains, the sea, and the mountains in the background! Here, my wish is granted. The profile of the mountain walls, difficult to reproduce, is highlighted by the morning light. The undulation of the dense foliage, its mountainous crown edged with snow defies the painter. From the shore, at the foot of these mountains, a uniform green expanse. I had never seen, even in painting, such a landscape" Pierre Morel in his Corsica (1951) wrote, "Let us not linger in this long plain, marshy and unhealthy, which occupies the east coast of the island."

== Tributaries ==
The following streams (ruisseaux) are tributaries of the Alistro (ordered by length) and sub-tributaries:

- Siala: 7 km (4.3 mi)
  - Pietrera: 4 km (2.5 mi)
  - Olmitelli: 2 km (1.2 mi)
    - Deceppi: 2 km (1.2 mi)
- Conche: 4 km (2.5 mi)
  - Forci: 3 km (1.9 mi)
- Grotta de Strallerone: 3 km (1.9 mi)
- Basse de Vallone: 3 km (1.9 mi)
- Poggialetti: 1 km (0.62 mi)

== Sources ==
- "5.05 Plaines Orientales" (PDF), Atlas des paysages de la Région Corse (in French), Direction régionale de l’environnement, de l’aménagement et du logement Corse
- Graziani, Antoine-Marie (2000). "Les ouvrages de défense en Corse contre les Turcs (1530-1650)". In Vergé-Franceschi, Michel; Graziani, Antoine-Marie (eds.). La guerre de course en Méditerranée (1515-1830) (in French). Paris: Presses de l'Université Paris IV-Sorbonne. pp. 73–144. ISBN 2-84050-167-8.
- "Plage d'Alistro", iflyer.corsica (in French), August Marine
- "Relation: Rivière d'Alistro (8487650)", OpenStreetMap
- "Rivière d'Alistro", Sandre (in French)
