= French submarine Perle (1935) =

Saphir-class submarine built for the French Navy

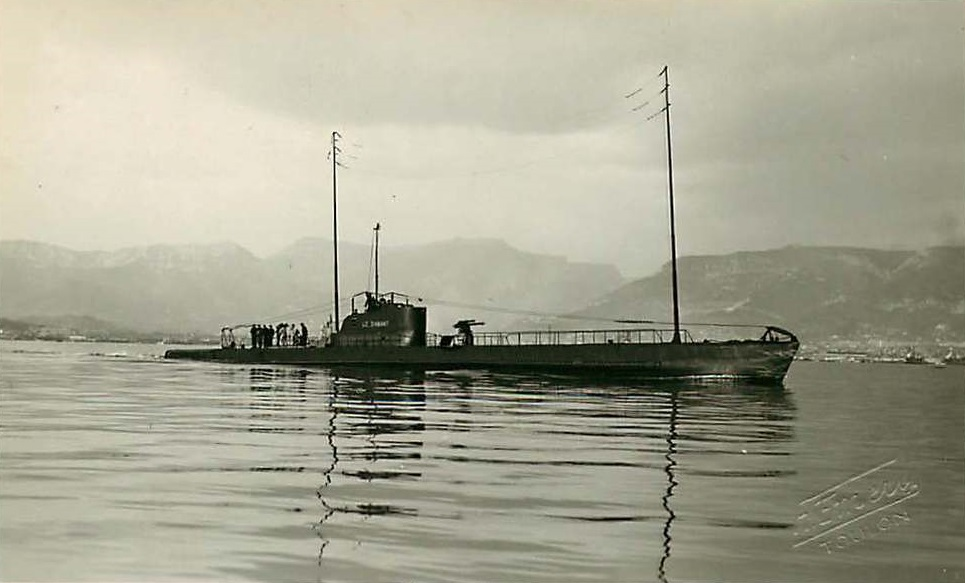
- Sister ship Diamant, date unknown

History

France
- Name: Perle
- Namesake: Pearl
- Builder: Arsenal de Toulon, Toulon, France
- Laid down: 1931
- Launched: 30 July 1935
- Commissioned: 1 March 1937
- Fate: Sunk 8 July 1944

General characteristics
- Class & type: Saphir-class submarine
- Displacement: 761 long tons (773 t) (surfaced); 925 long tons (940 t) (submerged)
- Length: 66 m (216 ft 6 in)
- Beam: 7.2 m (23 ft 7 in)
- Draught: 4.3 m (14 ft 1 in)
- Propulsion: 2 × diesel engines, 1,300 hp (969 kW); 2 × electric motors, 1,100 hp (820 kW)
- Speed: 12 knots (22 km/h; 14 mph) (surfaced); 9 knots (17 km/h; 10 mph) (submerged)
- Range: 7,000 nautical miles (13,000 km; 8,100 mi) at 7.5 knots (13.9 km/h; 8.6 mph); 4,000 nautical miles (7,400 km; 4,600 mi) at 12 knots (22 km/h; 14 mph); 80 nautical miles (148 km; 92 mi) at 4 knots (7.4 km/h; 4.6 mph) (submerged)
- Test depth: 80 m (262 ft)
- Complement: 42
- Armament: 3 × 550 mm (21.7 in) torpedo tubes; 2 × 400 mm (15.7 in) torpedo tubes; 1 × 75 mm (2.95 in) deck gun; 2 × 13.2 mm (0.52 in) machine guns; 2 × 8 mm (0.31 in) machine guns; 32 × mines

Perle was a Saphir-class submarine built for the French Navy in the mid-1930s. Laid down in 1931, she was launched in July 1935 and commissioned in March 1937. In November 1942, after Operation Torch, Perle joined the Allied fleet. While returning from refitting in the United States, Perle was mistaken for a U-boat by an aircraft from the British Merchant Aircraft Carrier Empire MacCallum and sunk.

== Design ==
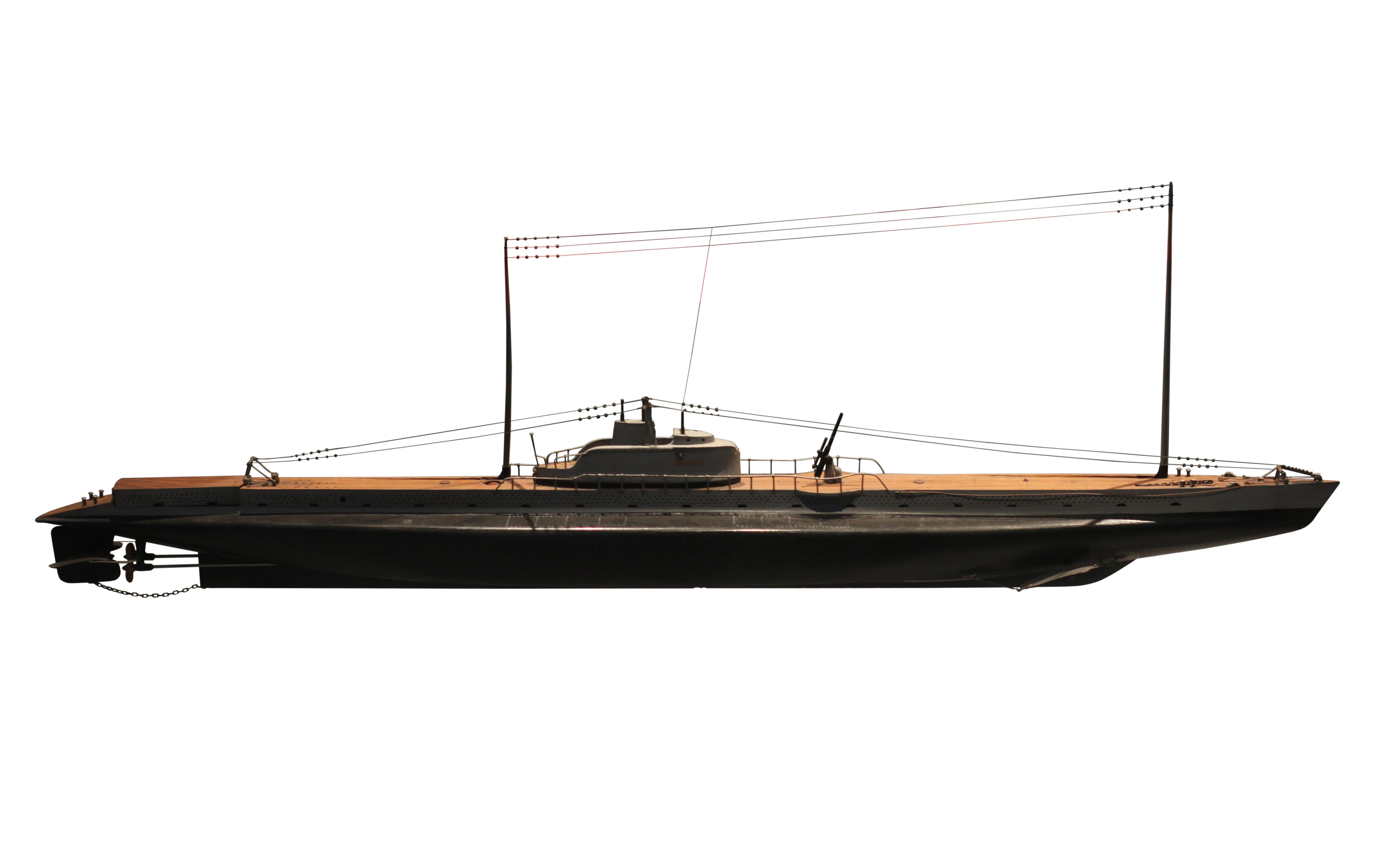
A scale model of Saphir displayed at the Musée national de la Marine

Perle had a surfaced displacement of 761 long tons (773 t) and a submerged displacement of 925 long tons (940 t). She was 66 m (216 ft 6 in) long, with a beam of 7.1 m (23 ft 4 in) and a draught of 4.3 m (14 ft 1 in). Propulsion while surfaced was provided by two Normand-Vickers diesel engines with a total of 1,300 bhp (969 kW) and while submerged by two electric motors providing a total of 1,000 hp (746 kW) through two shafts giving a maximum speed of 12 knots (22 km/h; 14 mph) while surfaced and 9 knots (17 km/h; 10 mph) while submerged. Her bunkers of 95 long tons (97 t; 15,200 st) of diesel fuel gave her a surfaced range of 7,000 nautical miles (13,000 km; 8,100 mi) at 7.5 knots (13.9 km/h; 8.6 mph) and 4,000 nautical miles (7,400 km; 4,600 mi) at 12 knots (22 km/h; 14 mph), and her batteries gave her a submerged range of 80 nautical miles (148 km; 92 mi) at 4 knots (7.4 km/h; 4.6 mph). She carried a complement of 42 men and could dive to a depth of up to 80 m (262 ft).

The Saphir-class submarines were armed with torpedoes and could lay mines without surfacing. The moored contact mines they used contained 220 kg (485 lb) of TNT and could be laid in waters up to 200 metres (656 ft) deep. They were attached to the submarine's exterior under a protective hydrodynamic housing.

== Service history ==
Laid down in 1931, Perle was launched in July 1935 and commissioned in March 1937. In November 1942, after Operation Torch, Perle joined the Allied fleet and was assigned to Dakar. After taking part in several operations, Perle sailed to the United States for refitting. On 26 June 1944, it left port and, after stopping in Newfoundland, Perle set sail for the port of Dundee in Scotland to participate in operations off Norway. On 8 July, Perle was mistaken for a U-boat by an Allied Fairey Swordfish and sunk in position 55°27′N 30°50′W. Approximately 17 of the crew of 42 survived the sinking but only one was rescued. The crew killed aboard Perle were the last casualties among French submariners in World War II.

== See also ==
- List of submarines of France
- French submarines of World War II

== Books ==
- Fontenoy, Paul E. (2007). Submarines: An Illustrated History of Their Impact (Weapons and Warfare). Santa Barbara: ABC-CLIO Publishing. ISBN 978-1-85109-563-6.
- Moulin, Jean (October–November 2022). "Les sous-marins mouilleurs de mine type Saphir" [The Saphir-Class Minelaying-Submarines]. Navires & Histoire (in French) (133): 88–95. ISSN 1280-4290.
