= French submarine Diamant (1933) =

Saphir-class submarine of the French Navy

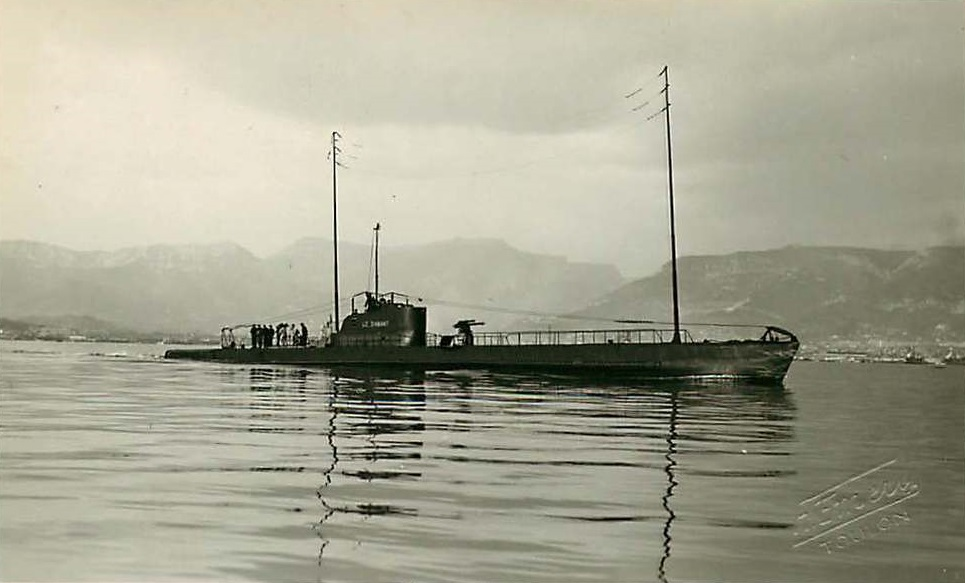
- Diamant, date unknown

History

France
- Name: Diamant
- Namesake: Diamond
- Operator: French Navy
- Builder: Arsenal de Toulon
- Laid down: 21 July 1930
- Launched: 18 May 1933
- Commissioned: 21 June 1934
- Fate: Scuttled at Toulon on 27 November 1942 to prevent her capture by German forces, then refloated by the Italians on 29 March 1943. Bombed and sunk at Toulon by Allied aircraft on 22 June 1944.

General characteristics
- Class & type: Saphir-class submarine
- Displacement: 761 long tons (773 t) (surfaced); 925 long tons (940 t) (submerged)
- Length: 66 m (216 ft 6 in)
- Beam: 7.1 m (23 ft 4 in)
- Draught: 4.3 m (14 ft 1 in)
- Propulsion: 2 × diesel engines, 1,300 hp (969 kW); 2 × electric motors, 1,100 hp (820 kW)
- Speed: 12 knots (22 km/h) (surfaced); 9 knots (17 km/h) (submerged)
- Range: 7,000 nautical miles (13,000 km) at 7.5 knots (13.9 km/h); 4,000 nautical miles (7,400 km) at 12 knots (22 km/h); 80 nautical miles (150 km) at 4 knots (7.4 km/h) (submerged)
- Test depth: 80 m (260 ft)
- Complement: 42 men
- Armament: 3 × 550 mm (21.7 in) torpedo tubes; 2 × 400 mm (15.7 in) torpedo tubes; 1 × 75 mm (3.0 in) deck gun; 2 × 13.2 mm (0.52 in) machine guns; 2 × 8 mm (0.31 in) machine guns; 32 × mines

The French submarine Diamant was a Saphir-class submarine built for the French Navy in the mid-1930s. Laid down in July 1930, it was launched in May 1933 and commissioned in June 1934. Diamant was scuttled at Toulon on 27 November 1942 to prevent her capture by German forces, then refloated by Italian forces on 29 March 1943. On 22 June 1944, Diamant was bombed and sunk at Toulon by Allied aircraft.

== Design ==
66 m (216 ft 6 in) long, with a beam of 7.1 m (23 ft 4 in) and a draught of 4.3 m (14 ft 1 in), Saphir-class submarines could dive up to 80 m (260 ft). The submarine had a surfaced displacement of 761 long tons (773 t) and a submerged displacement of 925 long tons (940 t). Propulsion while surfaced was provided by two 1,300 hp (969 kW) Normand-Vickers diesel motors and while submerged two 1,100 hp (820 kW) electric motors. The submarines electrical propulsion allowed it to attain speeds of 9 knots (17 km/h; 10 mph) while submerged. Their surfaced range was 7,000 nautical miles (13,000 km) at 7.5 knots (13.9 km/h), and 4,000 nautical miles (7,400 km) at 12 knots (22 km/h), with a submerged range of 80 nautical miles (150 km) at 4 knots (7.4 km/h).

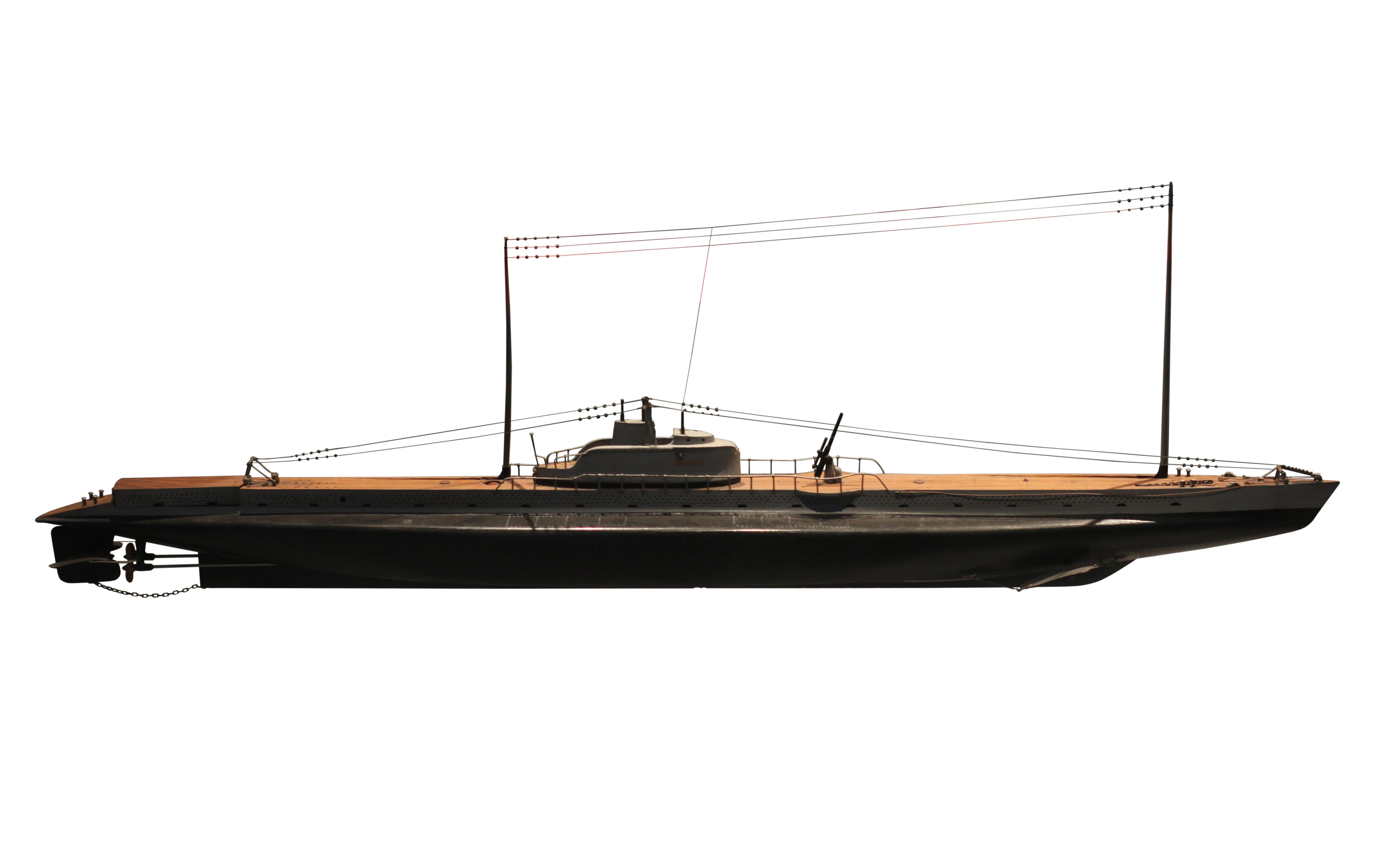
A scale model of Saphir on display at the Musée national de la Marine

The Saphir-class submarines were constructed to be able to launch torpedoes and lay mines without surfacing. The moored contact mines they used contained 220 kg (490 lb) of TNT and operated at up to 200 meters (660 ft) of depth. They were attached to the submarine's exterior under a hydrodynamic protection and were jettisoned with compressed air. The Saphir-class submarines also featured an automatic depth regulator that automatically flooded ballast tanks after mines were dropped to prevent the risk of the submarine surfacing in the middle of enemy waters.

== See also ==
- List of submarines of France
- French submarines of World War II
