= Sirène-class submarine (1925) =

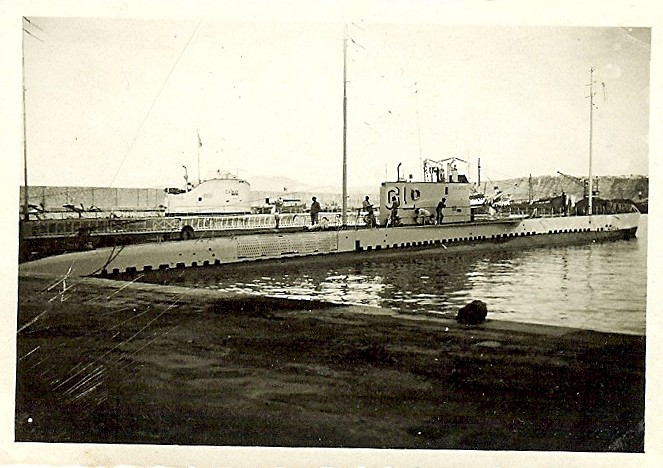
- Galatée at Oran, 1932

Class overview
- Name: Sirène class
- Builders: Ateliers et Chantiers de la Loire, Nantes
- Operators: French Navy
- Built: 1925–1927
- In commission: 1927–1944
- Completed: 4
- Lost: 3
- Retired: 1

General characteristics
- Type: Submarine
- Displacement: 609 long tons (619 t) surfaced; 757 long tons (769 t) submerged
- Length: 64m (212ft)
- Beam: 5.2m (17ft)
- Draught: 4.3m (14ft)
- Speed: 13.5 knots (25.0 km/h; 15.5 mph) surfaced; 7.5 knots (13.9 km/h; 8.6 mph) submerged
- Range: 3,500 nmi (6,500 km) at 7.5 kn (13.9 km/h; 8.6 mph)
- Complement: 41
- Armament: 7 × 550 mm (22 in) torpedo tubes; 1 × 75 mm (3 in) deck gun; 2 × 8 mm (0.31 in) machine guns

The Sirène-class submarines were a sub-class of the 600 Series built for the French Navy prior to World War II. There were four vessels in the class, built to a Loire-Simonot design. They were ordered in 1925 and completed by 1927. Three of the four boats of the Sirène class saw action during the Second World War, from September 1939 until the French armistice in June 1940.

== General characteristics ==
The Sirènes had a displacement of 609 long tons (619 t) surfaced and 757 long tons (769 t) submerged. They had an endurance of 3,500 nautical miles (6,500 km; 4,000 mi) at 7.5 knots (13.9 km/h; 8.6 mph), with a maximum surface speed of 13.5 knots (25.0 km/h; 15.5 mph), and a submerged speed of 7.5 knots (13.9 km/h; 8.6 mph). Their armament was seven torpedo tubes (3 forward, 2 midships, and 2 aft) with an outfit of 13 torpedoes. As with all French submarines of this period, the midships torpedo tubes were fitted externally in trainable mounts. They had a single 75 mm (3 in) and two 8 mm machine guns, and were manned by crews of 41 men.

== Ships ==
- Sirène, scuttled November 1942 Toulon; raised, sunk in air raid June 1944.
- Naïade, (Q124) scuttled November 1942 Toulon; raised, sunk in air raid twice; April 1943, November 1943.
- Galatée, scuttled November 1942 Toulon; raised, sunk in air raid June 1944.
- Nymphe, decommissioned in 1938.

== See also ==
- List of submarines of France
- French submarines of World War II
