= French submarine Cérès (1938) =

History

France
- Name: Cérès
- Namesake: Ceres
- Builder: Chantiers Worms, Rouen
- Laid down: 8 August 1936
- Launched: 9 December 1938
- Commissioned: 15 July 1939
- Stricken: 18 February 1946
- Identification: Q190
- Fate: Scuttled, 9 November 1942; Salvaged, 1943

General characteristics
- Class & type: Minerve-class submarine
- Displacement: 662 long tons (673 t) surfaced; 856 long tons (870 t) submerged
- Length: 68.1 m (223 ft 5 in)
- Beam: 5.6 m (18 ft 4 in)
- Draught: 4 m (13 ft 1 in)
- Propulsion: 2 × diesels 1,800 bhp (1,342 kW); 2 × electric motors 1,230 shp (917 kW)
- Speed: 14.2 knots (26.3 km/h; 16.3 mph) surfaced; 9 knots (17 km/h; 10 mph) submerged
- Test depth: 80 m (260 ft)
- Complement: 42
- Armament: 1 × 75 mm (3 in) deck gun; 2 × 13.2 mm (0.52 in) AA gun; 6 × 550 mm (21.7 in) torpedo tubes; 3 × 400 mm (15.7 in) torpedo tubes

Cérès (Q190) was a Minerve-class submarine of the French Navy. The submarine was laid down at the Chantiers Worms shipyard in Rouen on 8 August 1936, launched on 9 December 1938, and commissioned 15 July 1939.

Following Operation Torch, she was scuttled by her crew at Oran on 9 November 1942, to prevent her from falling into the hands of the Allies. She was later salvaged by the Allies in early 1943, but not put back into commission, and was eventually struck on 18 February 1946.

== See also ==
- List of submarines of France
