= Argonaute-class submarine =

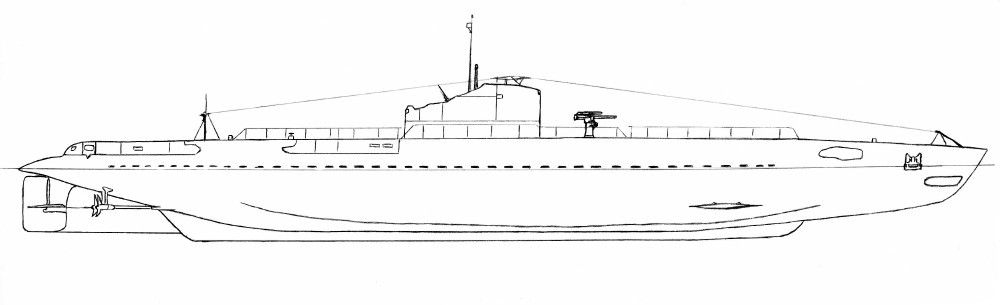

Class overview
- Name: Argonaute-class
- Builders: Schneider et Cie, Chalon sur Saône
- Operators: Marine Nationale; Free French Naval Forces
- Built: 1927–1935
- In commission: 1932–1945
- Completed: 5
- Lost: 1

General characteristics
- Type: Submarine
- Displacement: 630 tonnes (620 long tons) surfaced; 798 tonnes (785 long tons) submerged
- Length: 63.4 m (208 ft)
- Beam: 6.4 m (21 ft)
- Draught: 4.24 m (13.9 ft)
- Propulsion: 2 × Schneider-Carel diesel engines, 1,300 bhp (969 kW); 2 × electric motors, 1,000 shp (746 kW); 2 shafts
- Speed: 14 knots (26 km/h; 16 mph) surfaced; 9 knots (17 km/h; 10 mph) submerged
- Range: 4,000 nmi (7,400 km) at 10 knots (19 km/h; 12 mph) surfaced; 82 nmi (152 km) at 5 knots (9.3 km/h; 5.8 mph) submerged
- Test depth: 80 m (260 ft)
- Complement: 41
- Armament: 6 × 550 mm (22 in) torpedo tubes; 2 × 400 mm (16 in) torpedo tubes; 1 × 75 mm (3 in) deck gun; 1 × 8 mm (0.31 in) machine gun

The Argonaute class were a sub-class of the 600 Series submarines built for the French Navy prior to World War II. There were five vessels in the class, built to a Schneider-Laubeuf design. They were ordered in 1927 and completed by 1935.

== Development ==
The Argonaute class, though designated as Class 2 coastal submarines, were built for service in the Mediterranean. Ordered in 1927 and completed in 1935, they were built to conform to the interwar naval treaties arising from the 1922 Washington and 1930 London conferences, which placed restrictions on the number and size of warships of various types that nations could build. The coastal submarine was limited to a 600-ton surface displacement, though there was no limit placed on the numbers of these vessels that could be built.

== General characteristics ==
The Argonaute class were 63.4 m (208 ft) long, and displaced 630 tonnes surfaced and 798 tonnes submerged. They had a range of 4,000 nautical miles at 10 knots, with a maximum surface speed of 14 knots, and a submerged speed of 9 knots. Their armament consisted of eight torpedo tubes; six 550 mm (22 in) and two 400 mm (16 in), a 75 mm (3 in)/35 M1928 deck gun and a single 8 mm/80 machine gun. They carried a crew of 41 men.

== Service history ==
During World War II the submarines were based in French North Africa. On 8 November 1942 during Operation Torch Argonaute was sunk off Oran by the British destroyers Achates and Westcott. The remaining four boats joined the Free French Naval Forces in December 1942. Aréthuse, Atalante and La Vestale were laid up in reserve in 1944, and all four were eventually sold for scrap in 1946.

== Ships ==
- Argonaute (NN6). Laid down 19 December 1927, launched 23 May 1929, commissioned 1 June 1932, sunk on 8 November 1942.
- Aréthuse (NN7). Laid down 6 January 1928, launched 8 August 1929, commissioned 14 July 1933, sold 25 March 1946.
- Atalante (Q162). Laid down 17 August 1928, launched 5 August 1930, commissioned 18 September 1934, sold 25 March 1946.
- La Vestale (Q176). Laid down 30 January 1930, launched 25 May 1932, commissioned 18 September 1934, sold 14 August 1946.
- La Sultane (Q177). Laid down 3 February 1931, launched 5 August 1932, commissioned 20 May 1935, sold 27 December 1946.

== See also ==
- List of submarines of France
- French submarines of World War II
