= French submarine Pallas (1938) =

Former submarine used by the French Navy

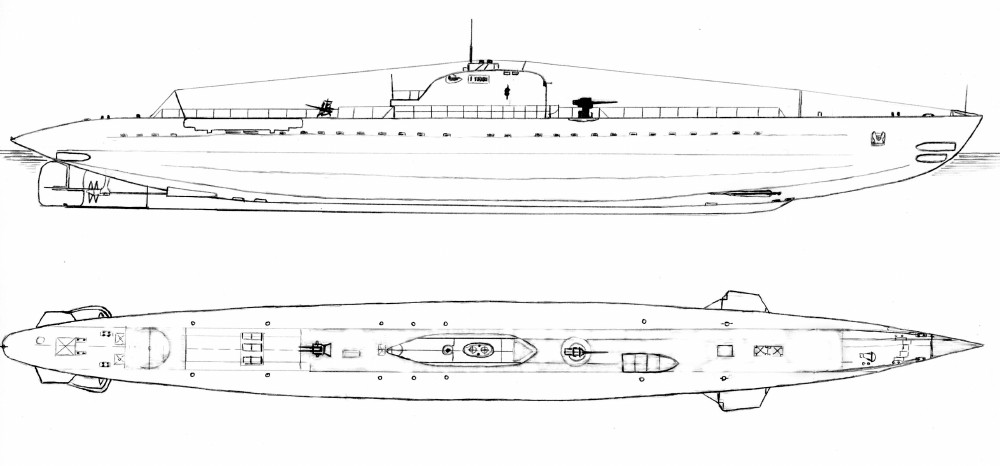
- Schematic of the Minerve-class submarine

History

France
- Name: Pallas
- Builder: Chantiers et Ateliers Augustin Normand, Le Havre
- Laid down: 19 October 1936
- Launched: 25 August 1938
- Commissioned: 12 June 1939
- Fate: Scuttled at Oran, 9 November 1942

General characteristics
- Class & type: Minerve-class submarine
- Displacement: 662 long tons (673 t) surfaced; 856 long tons (870 t) submerged
- Length: 68.1 m (223 ft 5 in)
- Beam: 5.6 m (18 ft 4 in)
- Draught: 4 m (13 ft 1 in)
- Propulsion: 2 × Vickers-Normand diesel engines, 1,800 bhp (1,342 kW); 2 × Electric motors, 1,230 shp (917 kW)
- Speed: 14.2 knots (26.3 km/h; 16.3 mph) surfaced; 9 knots (17 km/h; 10 mph) submerged
- Range: 2,000 nmi (3,700 km; 2,300 mi) at 10 knots (19 km/h; 12 mph) surfaced; 85 nmi (157 km; 98 mi) at 5 knots (9.3 km/h; 5.8 mph) submerged
- Test depth: 80 m (260 ft)
- Complement: 42
- Armament: 1 × 75 mm (3 in)/35 Model 1928 deck gun with 150 rounds; 2 × 13.2 mm (0.52 in) AA machine guns; 6 × 550 mm (21.7 in) internal torpedo tubes (4 bow/2 stern) with 12 torpedoes; 3 × 400 mm (15.7 in) external torpedo tubes

Pallas (Q189) was a Minerve-class submarine of the French Navy. The submarine was laid down at the Chantiers et Ateliers Augustin Normand shipyard in Le Havre on 19 October 1936, launched on 25 August 1938, and commissioned on 12 June 1939.

Following Operation Torch, she was scuttled by her crew at Oran on 9 November 1942, to prevent her from falling into the hands of the Allies. She was later salvaged by the Allies in early 1943, but not put back into commission, and was eventually struck in 1944.

== See also ==
- List of submarines of France
