= French submarines of World War II =

The French submarine fleet of World War II was one of the largest in the world at that time. It saw action during the war but had a chequered service history due to France's position at that time. During the conflict, 59 submarines, more than three-quarters of the fleet, were lost.

== Construction history ==
After World War I France had a fleet of 36 submarines, in a variety of classes, plus 11 ex-German U-boats; these were mostly obsolete (all had been disposed of by the 1930s) and she was interested in replacing them. To this end the French Navy made plans for a fleet of vessels in three Types: Type I ocean-going / grand patrol; Type 2 coastal defence; Type 3 mine layers.

At the same time, the major powers were negotiating an arms limitation treaty at the 1922 Washington Naval Conference. There was discussion of banning submarines altogether, and to outlaw their use (a course favoured by Britain) both France and Italy opposed this. However the conference did place restrictions on the number and size of warships of various types that nations could build. The ocean-going submarine was restricted to a 1500-ton surface displacement, while the coastal submarine was limited to 600 tons, though there was no limit placed on the numbers of these vessels that could be built.

The first submarines completed by France after World War I were the three boats of the O'Byrne class (O'Byrne, Henri Fournier and Louis Dupetit-Thouars). Initially built on Romanian order, they were completed for the French Navy and commissioned in 1921.

In 1922–23 France ordered the Requin class, a Type 1 submarine. These ran to 9 vessels, but their indifferent performance led to calls for an improved design. This came in 1924 with the Redoutable class, a successful design, which ran to 31 vessels in three series.

In 1923 the French Navy placed orders for a series of coastal/seagoing Type 2 boats. The order was placed with three different design bureaux, which led to three different designs to the same specification. Known collectively as the 600 Series, these were the Sirène, Ariane and Circé classes, a total of 10 boats. They were followed in 1926 by the 630 Series, another three classes from the same bureaux. These were the Argonaute, Orion and Diane classes, a further 16 boats. In 1934 the Navy opted for a standardized Admiralty design, the Minerve class of 6 boats, and in 1939 by the Aurore class, a larger, much improved version of the Minerve. And further enlarged design, the Phenix class, were ordered but not built, due to France's defeat in 1940 and the subsequent armistice.

The type 3 minelayer was represented by the Saphir class, a 1925 order for 6 boats. These were followed in 1937 by the Émeraude class, but again these were not built before the 1940 armistice.

France also experimented with the concept of the submarine cruiser, in common with other navies of the time. In 1926 she built the Surcouf, for many years the largest submarine ever built. However the vessel had little role to play in French naval strategy, and the experiment was not repeated.

Thus in 1939 France had, in total, a fleet of 77 submarines, making it the fifth largest submarine force in the world at that time.

== Design features ==
While being designed by different bureaux, the French submarines of this period shared a number of features. They were generally double-hulled, with an emphasis on good surface handling, though this led to them being indifferent divers. They also emphasized habitability, needing to be suitable for service in France's colonial empire, which could mean long voyages and operations in the tropics.

One unique feature was the use of external torpedo mounts. As well as torpedo tubes in the bow and stern, most French submarines carried torpedo tubes externally in trainable mounts, built into the outer casing. These could be trained to fire at various angles beyond fore and aft, but could not be re-loaded at sea. French submarines also mounted torpedoes of different calibres, typically carrying the 400mm (15.75 inch) torpedo, for use against "soft" targets such as merchant ships, as well as the 550mm (21.7 in) torpedo for use against warships.

== Service history ==
The role of the French submarine force in 1939 was to act in concert with the French fleet and with France's allies against the Axis powers, with particular responsibilities in the Mediterranean. It also operated in defence of France's overseas territories and colonial empire. This changed in 1940 with the fall of France and the signing of the armistice with Germany.

One submarine had been sunk in action, and several others scuttled to prevent their capture; seven others, in British ports at the time of the armistice, became part of the Free French naval force (FNFL). The captured Aurore class boat Favorite was taken into German service as UF-2, a training ship. However the majority remained under the control of the Vichy government.

Over the next two years 16 submarines were lost in Vichy service, mostly in clashes with British and Allied forces.

In November 1942, with the invasion of Vichy territory by the Germans, many of the remaining vessels were scuttled, or captured by the Axis. Those that survived, or managed to escape, joined the FNFL; despite losses, and with replacement from allied navies, France ended the war with 20 submarines in service, having lost 50 boats from a variety of causes.

== Classes ==
Type 1 grand patrol/ocean-going submarine

- Requin class: 9 units built 1928–1931
- Redoutable class : 31 units built 1928–1937
  - Redoutable (1st series) : 19 units 1928-31
  - Espoir (2nd series) : 6 units 1931-34
  - Agosta (3rd series) : 6 units 1934-37

Type 2 coastal/sea-going submarines

- 600 Series
  - Sirène class : 4 units built 1925–1926
  - Ariane class : 4 units built 1925–1927
  - Circé class : 4 units built 1925–1927
- 630 Series
  - Argonaute class : 5 units built 1929–1932
  - Orion class : 2 units built 1931
  - Diane class : 9 units built 1930–1932
- Minerve class : 6 units built 1934–1938
- Aurore class : 8 ordered; 1 completed by 1939
- Phénix class : 13 ordered; none completed

Type 3 minelayer submarines

- Saphir class : 6 units built 1928–1935
- Émeraude class : 4 ordered; none completed

Cruiser submarine

- Surcouf : 1 unit built 1929

In addition, Free French forces operated Curie, a British built U-class submarine.

== See also ==
- List of submarines of France
