= 75 mm field gun M1897 on M2 carriage =

75 mm field gun M1897 on M2A2 carriage
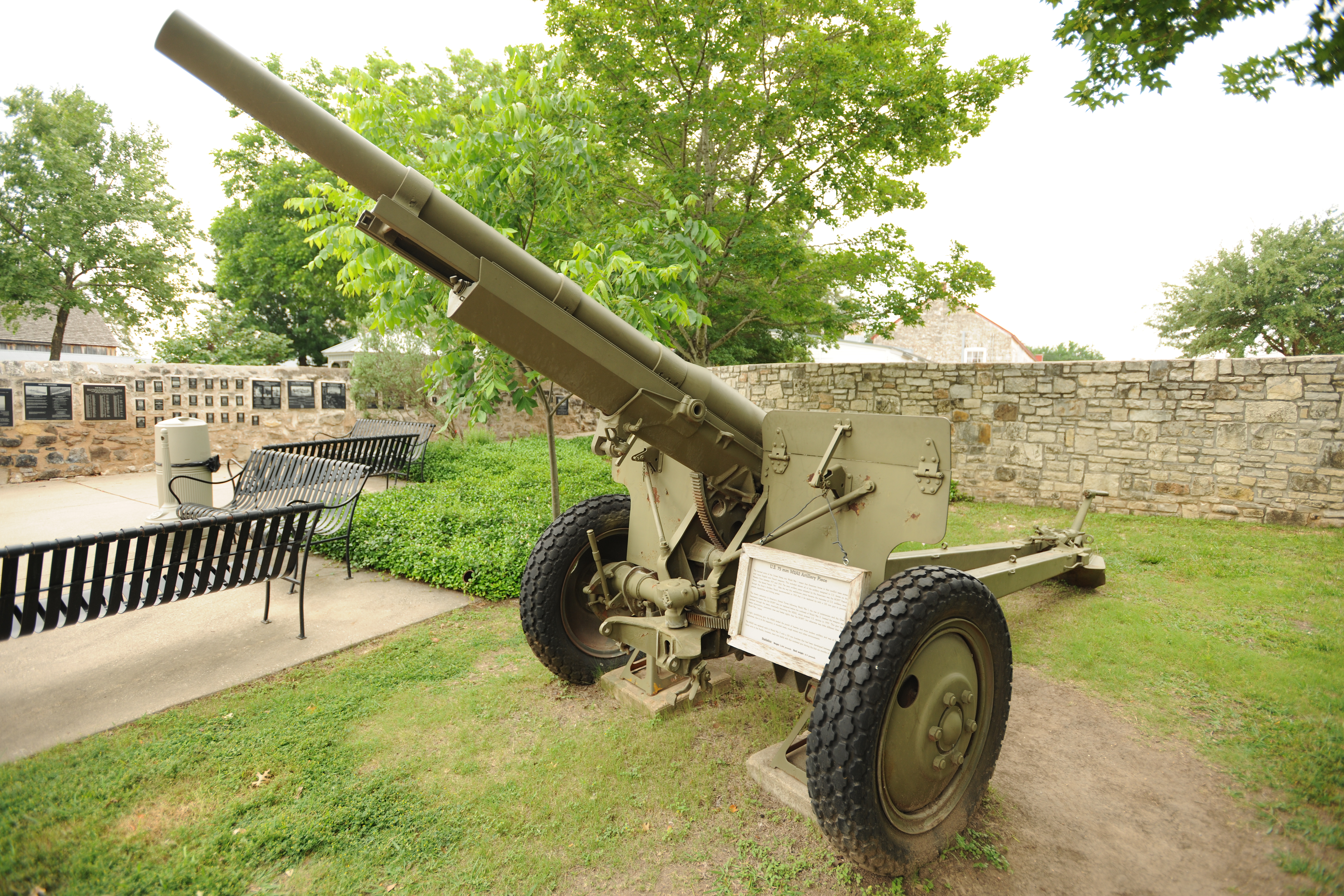
- An M1897 gun on an M2A2 carriage at the National Museum of the Pacific War.
- Type: Field gun Anti-tank gun
- Place of origin: France and United States

Service history
- Used by: United States; United Kingdom
- Wars: World War II

Production history
- Designer: Joseph-Albert Deport; Etienne Sainte-Claire Deville; Thorsten Nordenfelt; Emile Rimailho.
- Manufacturer: Barrels: French arsenals; Carriages: Rock Island Arsenal Parish Pressed Steel
- Produced: Barrels: 1897–1940; Carriages: 1936–1941
- No. built: 1,250
- Variants: Towed: Carriage M2 Carriage M2A1 Carriage M2A2 Carriage M2A3; Self-propelled: M3 GMC

Specifications
- Mass: 3,447 lb (1,564 kg)
- Length: 18 ft 4 in (5.59 m)
- Barrel length: 8 ft 10 in (2.69 m) L/36
- Height: 4 ft 8 in (1.42 m)
- Shell: Fixed QF 75×350 mm R
- Caliber: 75 mm (2.95 in)
- Breech: Nordenfelt eccentric screw
- Recoil: Hydro-pneumatic
- Carriage: Split-trail
- Elevation: −10° to +46°
- Traverse: 45° R / 40° L
- Rate of fire: 6 rpm
- Muzzle velocity: 2,000 ft/s (610 m/s)
- Maximum firing range: 7.9 mi (12.7 km)

The 75 mm field gun M1897 on M2 carriage was a field gun and anti-tank gun which was used by the US Army during the interwar period and World War II.

== History ==
When the United States entered World War I on the side of the Allied Powers in 1917, it lacked sufficient arms to supply its rapidly expanding armed forces. Although the United States had been providing arms and supplies to the Allies, few of these weapons were being used to arm US forces. The few weapons that the US Army did have were often of a different caliber than British or French weapons, thus using incompatible ammunition. When the United States entered the war, the Allies had an adequate supply of arms, but they were running short of manpower; since the United States initially had more manpower than weapons, the Allies decided it made logistical sense to first give the Americans British and French weapons to solve their arms shortfall and bring them rapidly into action, rather than wait for the country's industry to catch up with its expanding armed forces.

== Design ==
Originally of French design, the Canon de 75 modèle 1897 was supplied to the United States in large numbers and became the standard field gun for the US Army during World War I. The mle 1897 was a revolutionary breech-loading artillery piece that combined a Nordenfelt eccentric screw breech, fixed "quickfire" ammunition, and a hydro-pneumatic recoil mechanism. The combination of fixed ammunition, recoil mechanism, and simple breech made the mle 1897 one of the fastest-firing and most accurate field guns of its era. It had a box trail carriage with a gun shield, and two wooden-spoked steel-rimmed wheels on an unsprung axle, designed for horse traction.

== World War I ==
In US service the mle 1897 was given the designation 75 mm gun M1897. There were 480 American 75 mm field gun batteries (over 1,900 guns) on the battlefields of France in November 1918. American industry began building the mle 1897 in the spring of 1918, but only 143 American-built guns had been shipped to France by 11 November 1918, and most American batteries used French-built 75s.

== Between World Wars ==
Although World War I had shown that direct fire, light field guns like the mle 1897 lacked adequate firepower to destroy an entrenched enemy, the majority of combatants had large numbers of them and had little impetus to replace them. With a limited peacetime budget, the US Army, like other armies, opted to modernize its existing medium artillery. From 1920 to 1925, the Ordnance Department modified the M1897 gun by placing it on a new carriage designed to address the shortcomings of the box trail carriage that included limited traverse, limited elevation, and limited range. The new weapon was standardized in 1926 as the "75 mm gun M1 on carriage M2A1." Only one battery's worth of these weapons were completed before the project stopped because of lack of funding.

The new M2A1 carriage had a sprung axle with steel disc wheels and pneumatic tires, a new gun shield, and an integrated jack. In 1932, it was accepted for small-scale production. The barrels and counter-recoil mechanisms came from 2,000 unconverted M1897s that were in storage. The conversion to the M2A1 carriages added 743 lb (337 kg). The increased elevation allowed the modernized guns to be used for both direct and indirect fire roles because of greater range (7.9 mi (12.7 km) vs 5.3 miles (8.5 km)) and greater muzzle velocity (2,000 ft/s (610 m/s) vs 1,740 ft/s (529 m/s)).

=== Modernization of field artillery ===
In 1932, a modified gun known as the M2 was standardized for limited production. It took advantage of new projectiles and developments in high explosives. In the early 1930s, the U.S. Army Chief of Staff, General Douglas MacArthur, ordered the motorization of half of the Army's light field artillery. To achieve this, existing box trail 75 mm gun carriages were given sprung axles, steel wheels, and pneumatic tires to allow them to be towed behind vehicles at higher speeds. On 18 January 1934, the conversion kit for existing guns was standardized, and modernized guns were given the designations "75 mm field gun M1897A1," "75 mm field gun M1897A2," "75 mm field gun M1897A3," and "75 mm field gun M1897A4." The M1897A2 had an autofretted barrel, no barrel jacket, and 156° vs 120° breech mechanism. The M1897A3 and M1897A4 were similar to the M1897A2, except the M1897A4 had the muzzle guides removed and replaced by steel rails with bronze strips. That allowed to reduce maintenance costs. The modifications added 350 lb (160 kg) of weight, but performance remained the same.

In 1934, the first conversion kits were issued to fourteen National Guard field artillery regiments. By October 1941, 871 conversions had been authorized but only 605 guns had been completed. Modernization of 75 mm guns also involved placing M1897 guns on new M2A1 carriages. Production of the M2A2 carriage, featuring newly made M2 recoil mechanisms assembled from tubes mounted in a cradle (instead of a solid steel forging bored through as on M1897), began in 1936, but the conversion process was slow, and by the end of 1939 only 200 were converted. In 1940, a simplified carriage known as the M2A3 was introduced, see below.

As of 1939, the cost of modernization was about $8,000 per piece – less than a third of a new 105-mm howitzer.

By 1940, the War Department had modernized 56 of its 81 75 mm gun battalions in the Regular Army and National Guard with these two conversions. These guns were used extensively for training and pre-war exercises. However, none are believed to have been used in combat by US forces during World War II.

== World War II ==
After the defeat of France in the spring of 1940, the U.S. Army became worried about its lack of modern antitank guns. In July 1940, a simplified carriage with the jack eliminated that lightened the gun about 100 kg but reduced traverse angles by about a third to ±30° known as the M2A3 was introduced, and it was decided to mount M1897 guns on both M2A2 and M2A3 carriages and equip them with direct-fire sights so they could be used as anti-tank guns. 918 M2A3 carriages had been manufactured by November 1941, and a report that month stated that 554 M2A2 and 188 M2A3 carriages were in service; because of the shortage of modern artillery pieces, these guns were issued to both field artillery and anti-tank units.

In 1941, field artillery units began converting to the new 105 mm M2 Howitzer, and some M1897s were removed from their towed carriages and installed on the half-track M3 gun motor carriage (GMC). The towed version and the M3 GMC was used by American tank destroyer battalions during operations in the North African and Italian campaigns. M3 GMCs were also used in the Pacific theater during the Philippines campaign and by Marine Regimental Weapons Companies until 1944. Their performance in an anti-tank role was adequate against Japanese and Italian armor but inadequate against late war German armor. M3 GMCs remained in use with the British in Italy and North West Europe in small numbers until the end of the war. Towed guns were also used for training and on 8 March 1945, they were declared obsolete and retired.

== Ammunition ==
The M1897 guns used the same 75×350 mm R ammunition as the 75 mm gun M2/M3/M6 tank guns of the M3 Lee, M4 Sherman, M24 Chaffee, and 'gunship' version of the North American B-25 Mitchell bomber. The M2 was a L/31 gun, the M1897 was L/36, and the M3 was L/40. The muzzle velocity of the M2 was 1,930 ft/s (588 m/s), the M1897 was 2,000 ft/s (610 m/s), and the M3 was 2,030 ft/s (619 m/s). Armor penetration statistics are approximate and based on M3 data.

Ammunition performance
Ammunition	Weight (round)	Weight (projectile)	Armor penetration of rolled homogeneous armor at 30°			
Ammunition	Weight (round)	Weight (projectile)	500 yd	1000 yd	1500 yd	2000 yd
M61 APC	19.9 lb (9.0 kg)	13.93 lb (6.32 kg)	2.7 in (69 mm)	2.4 in (61 mm)	2.2 in (56 mm)	1.9 in (48 mm)
M66 HEAT	16.3 lb (7.39 kg)	13.1 lb (5.94 kg)	3.62 in (92 mm)	3.62 in (92 mm)	3.62 in (92 mm)	3.62 in (92 mm)
M72 AP	18.8 lb (8.5 kg)	14.92 lb (6.77 kg)	2.3 in (58 mm)	1.8 in (46 mm)	1.3 in (33 mm)	1.0 in (25 mm)
M41 HE	17.4 lb (7.89 kg)	13.8 lb (6.24 kg)				
M48 HE	18.2 lb (8.27 kg)	14.6 lb (6.62 kg)				
M64 Incendiary	18.9 lb (8.56 kg)	15.2 lb (6.91 kg)				
M89 Smoke	19.0 lb (8.64 kg)	15.4 lb (6.99 kg)				
MK1 Shrapnel	6.5 lb (2.9 kg) lead balls					

== See also ==
- Canon de 75 modèle 1897 modifié 1938 – A mle 1897 modernized for motor traction.
- 7.5 cm Pak 97/38 – A German modification of mle 1897 barrels on Pak 38 carriages.
- 76 mm divisional gun M1902/30 – A field gun modernized for motor traction.
- QF 18-pounder gun – A field gun modernized for motor traction.

== Gallery ==
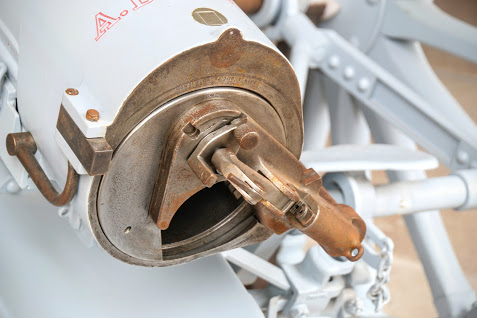
The breech of a mle 1897 taken at the Musée de l'Armée, Paris

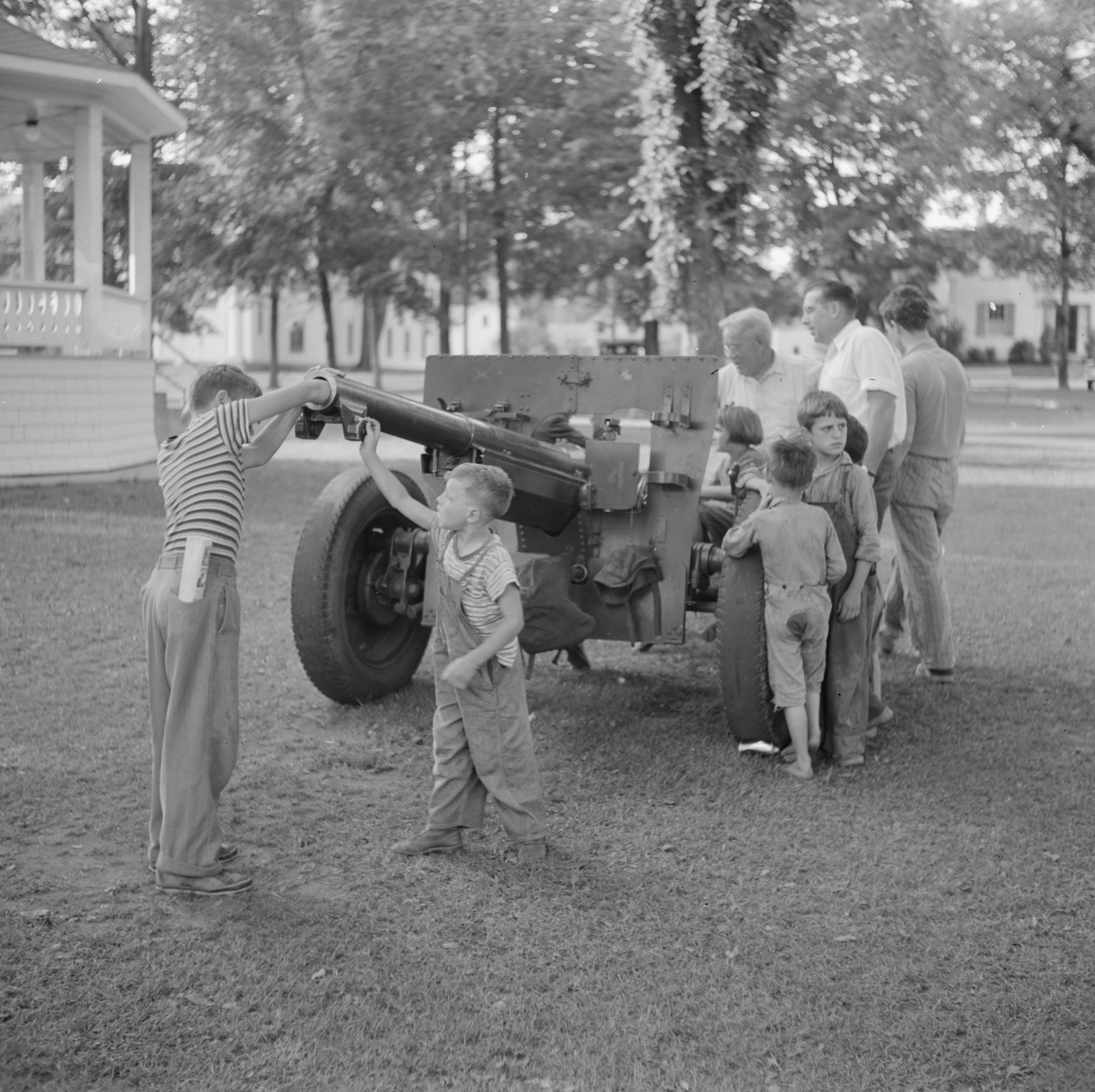
A M1897 with original box trail carriage but modernized with pneumatic tires

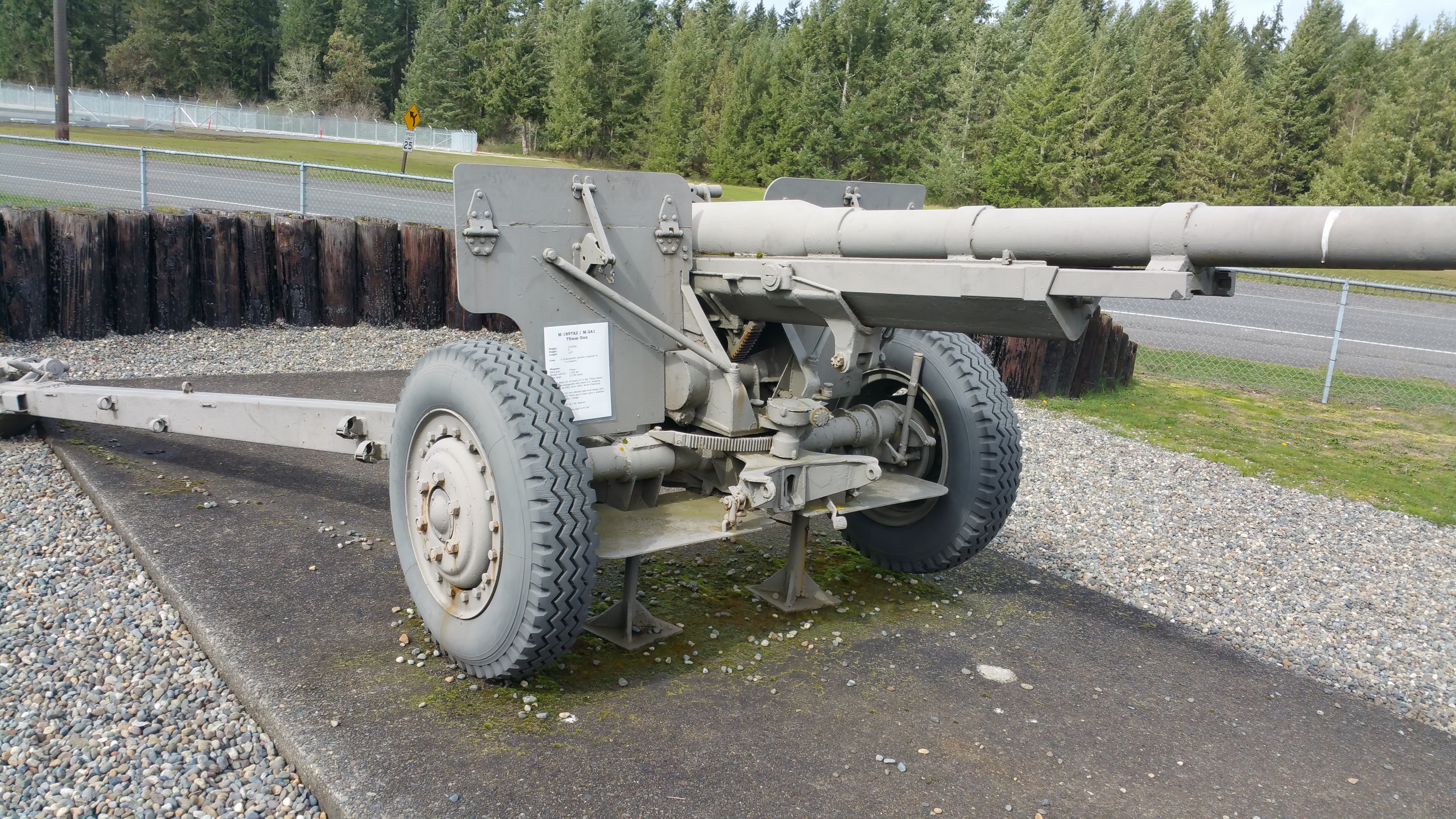
A M1897 on M2A2 carriage

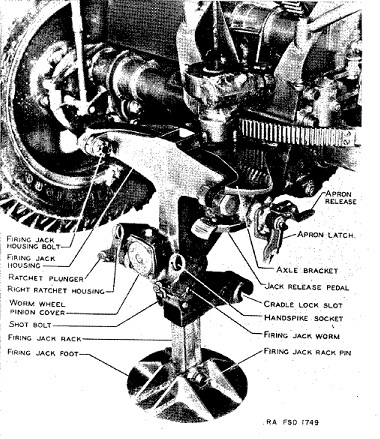
A jack on a M2A2 carriage

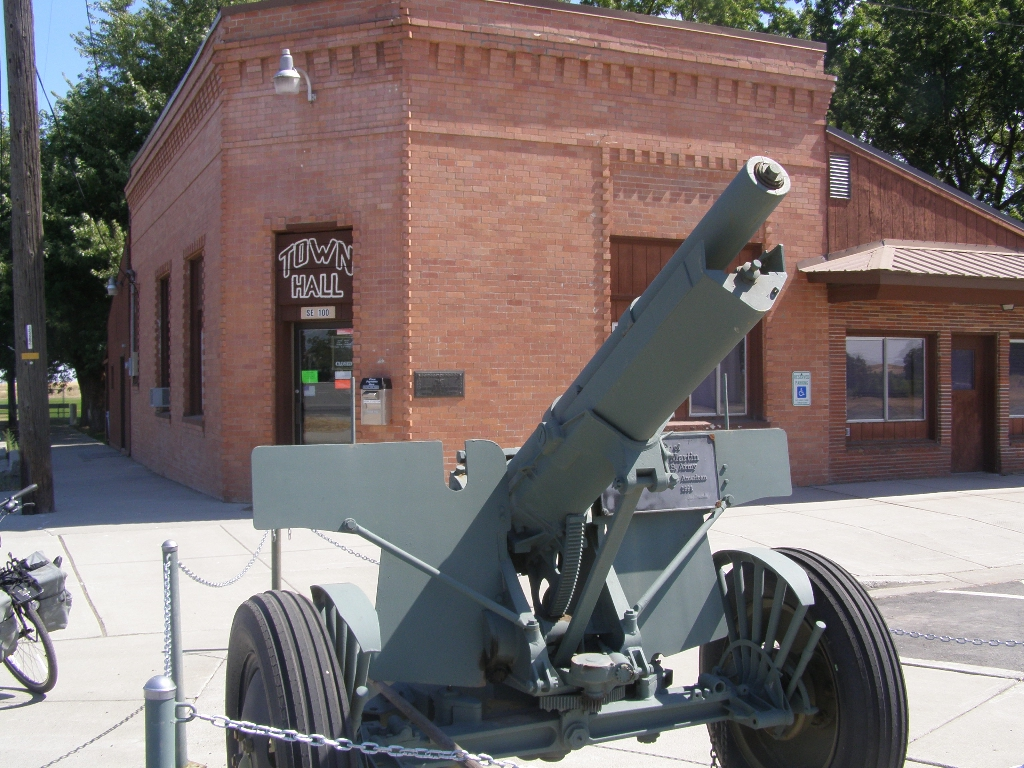
A M1897 on M2A3 carriage showing its retracted crescent-shaped jacks

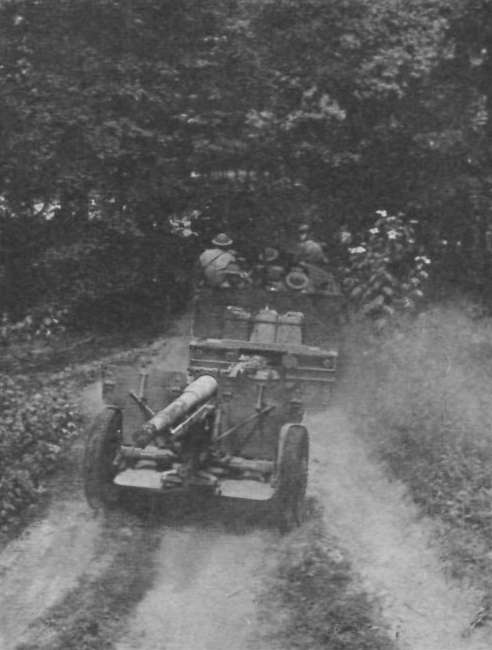
A M1897 on a M2A2 carriage during the Tennessee maneuvers

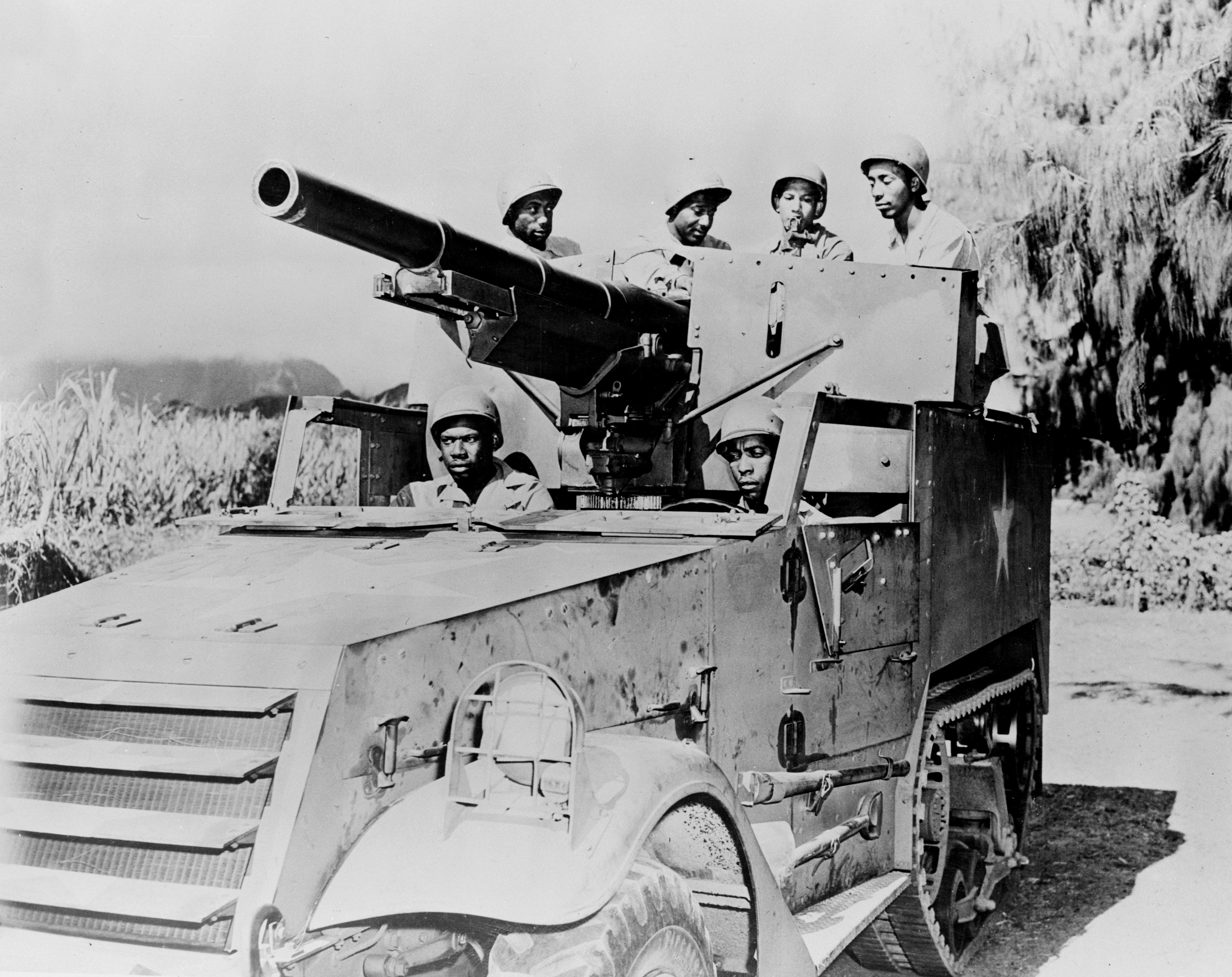
An M1897 on M3 motor gun carriage

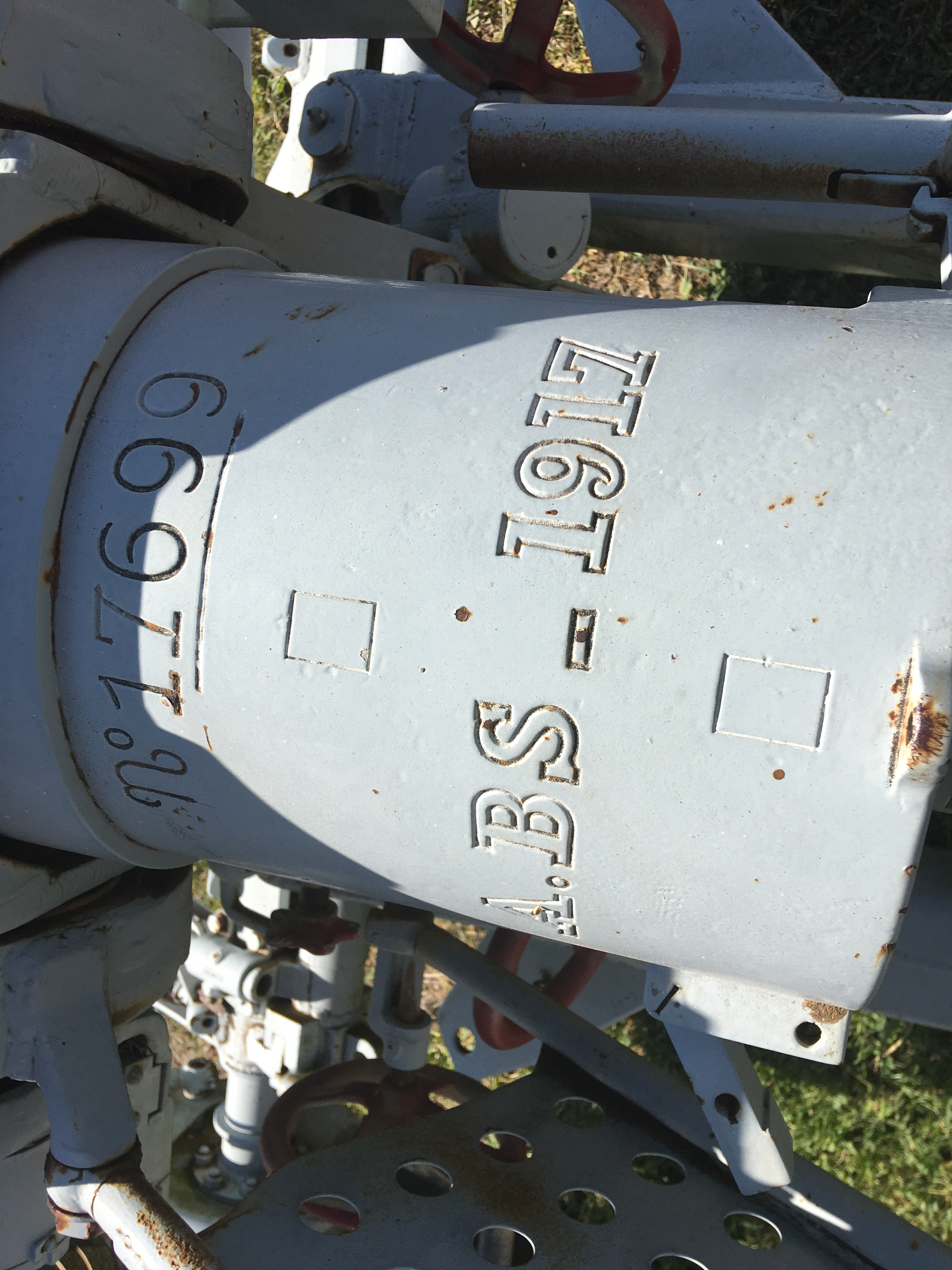
French barrel markings on a M1897 on M2A3 carriage

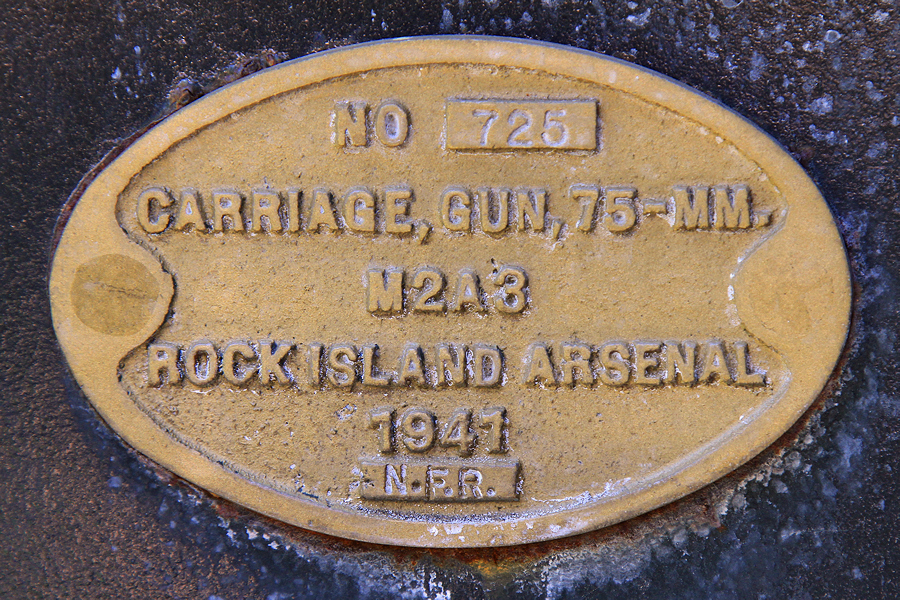
The identification plaque of a M2A3 carriage

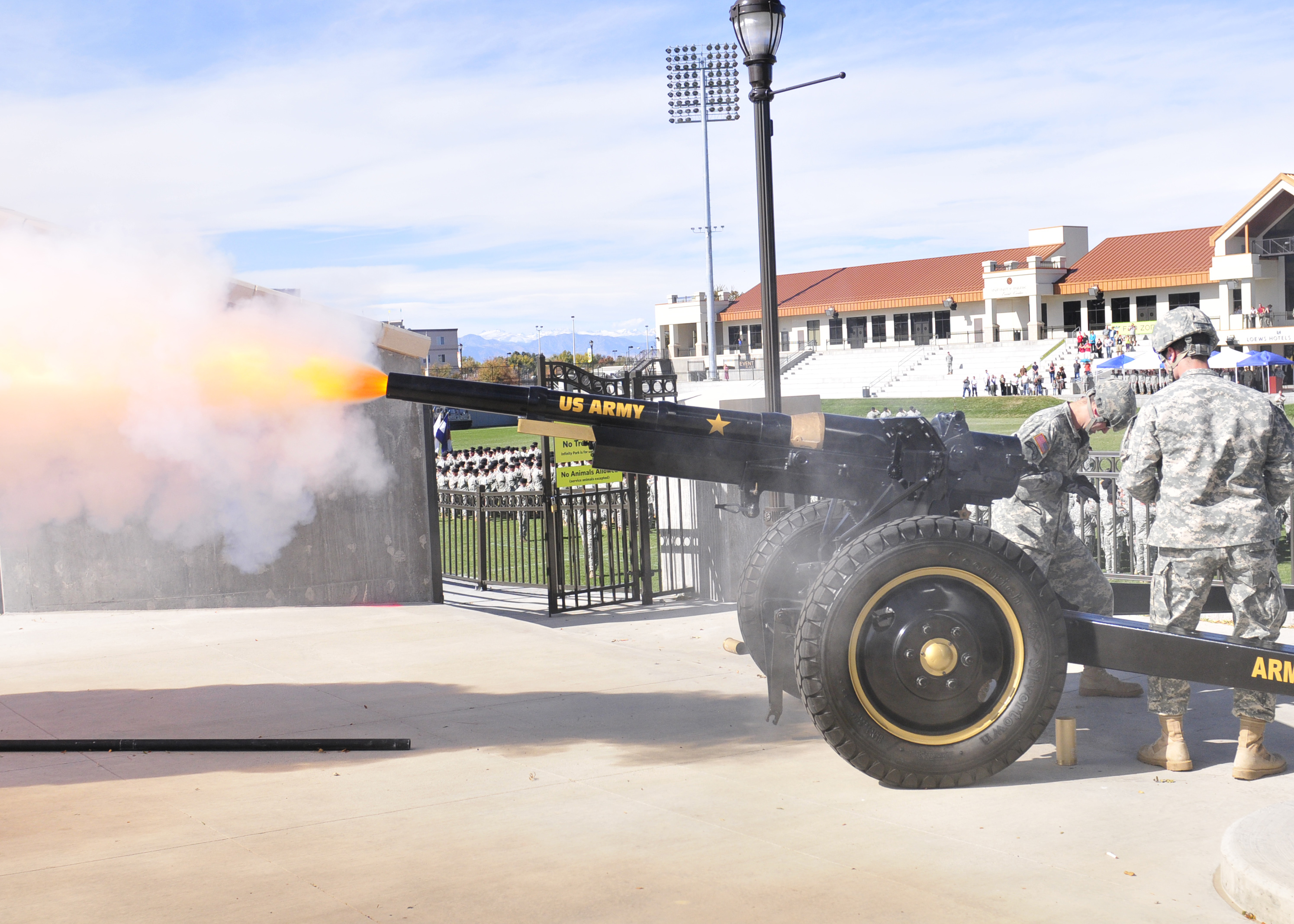
Soldiers of the 169th Field Artillery Brigade, Colorado Army National Guard, fire a M1897 ceremonial gun
