= Canon de 75 modèle 1897 =

Canon de 75 mm Modèle 1897
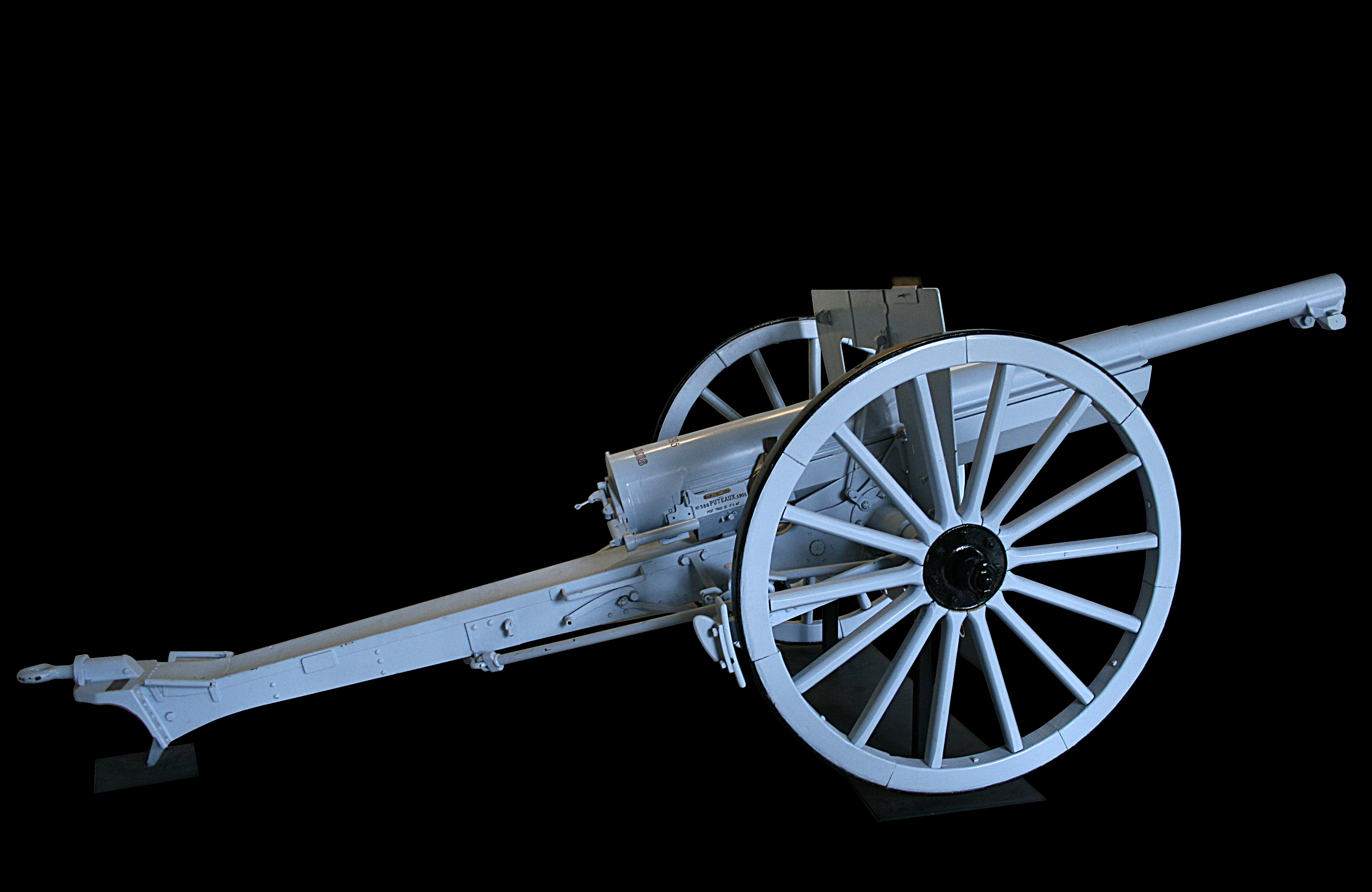
- Canon de 75 Modèle 1897 on display in Les Invalides
- Type: Regimental artillery field gun
- Place of origin: France

Service history
- In service: 1898–present (still used as a saluting gun)
- Used by: See § Users
- Wars: Many conflicts, including: French colonial campaigns; Boxer Rebellion; World War I; Polish–Soviet War; Rif War; Spanish Civil War; Second Sino Japanese War; World War II

Production history
- Designer: Albert Deport; Etienne Sainte-Claire Deville; Emile Rimailho
- Designed: 1891–1896
- Manufacturer: Gov. arsenals: Puteaux; Bourges; Tarbes; Saint-Étienne
- Produced: 1897–1940
- No. built: 21,000+
- Variants: See § Variants and derivatives

Specifications
- Mass: 1,544 kg (3,404 lb)
- Barrel length: 8 ft 10 in (2.69 m) L/36
- Width: 2 m (6 ft 7 in)
- Height: 1.4 m (4 ft 7 in)
- Crew: 6
- Shell: Fixed QF 75×350 mm R
- Shell weight: List of shells: HE: 5.4 kg (12 lb); HEAT: 5.97–7.25 kg (13.2–16.0 lb); Shrapnel: 7.24 kg (16.0 lb)
- Caliber: 75 mm (2.95 in)
- Breech: Nordenfelt eccentric screw
- Recoil: Hydraulic
- Carriage: Fixed trail (Towed by 6 horse team, or an artillery tractor)
- Elevation: −11° / +18°
- Traverse: 6°
- Rate of fire: Burst: 15–30 Rounds/min (Dependent on crew training and fatigue); Sustained: 3–4 Rounds/min (Dependent on rate of cooling)
- Muzzle velocity: 500 m/s (1,600 ft/s)
- Effective firing range: HE: 8,500 m (9,300 yd); Shrapnel: 6,800 m (7,400 yd)
- Maximum firing range: 11,000 m (12,000 yd)

The French 75 mm field gun is a quick-firing field artillery piece adopted in March 1898. Its official French designation was: Canon de 75 mm Mle 1897. It was commonly known as the French 75, simply the 75 and Soixante-Quinze (French for "seventy-five"). The French 75 was designed as an anti-personnel weapon system for delivering large volumes of time-fused shrapnel shells on enemy troops advancing in the open. After 1915 and the onset of trench warfare, impact-detonated high-explosive shells prevailed. By 1918, the 75 became the main agents of delivery for toxic gas shells. The 75s also became widely used as truck mounted anti-aircraft artillery. They were the main armament of the Saint-Chamond tank in 1918 and the Char 2C.

The French 75 is widely regarded as the first modern artillery piece. It was the first field gun to include a hydro-pneumatic recoil mechanism, which kept the gun's trail and wheels perfectly still during the firing sequence. Since it did not need to be re-aimed after each shot, the crew could reload and fire as soon as the barrel returned to its resting position. In typical use, the French 75 could deliver fifteen rounds per minute on its target, either shrapnel or melinite high-explosive, up to about 8,500 m (5.3 mi) away. Its firing rate could even reach close to 30 rounds per minute, albeit only for a very short time and with a highly experienced crew.

At the opening of World War I, in 1914, the French Army had about 4,000 of these field guns in service. By the end of the war, about 12,000 had been produced. It was also in service with the American Expeditionary Forces, which had been supplied with about 2,000 French 75 field guns. Several thousand were still in use in the French Army at the opening of World War II, updated with new wheels and tires to allow towing by trucks rather than by horses. The French 75 set the pattern for almost all early-20th century field pieces, with guns of mostly 75 mm forming the basis of many field artillery units into the early stages of World War II.

== Development ==
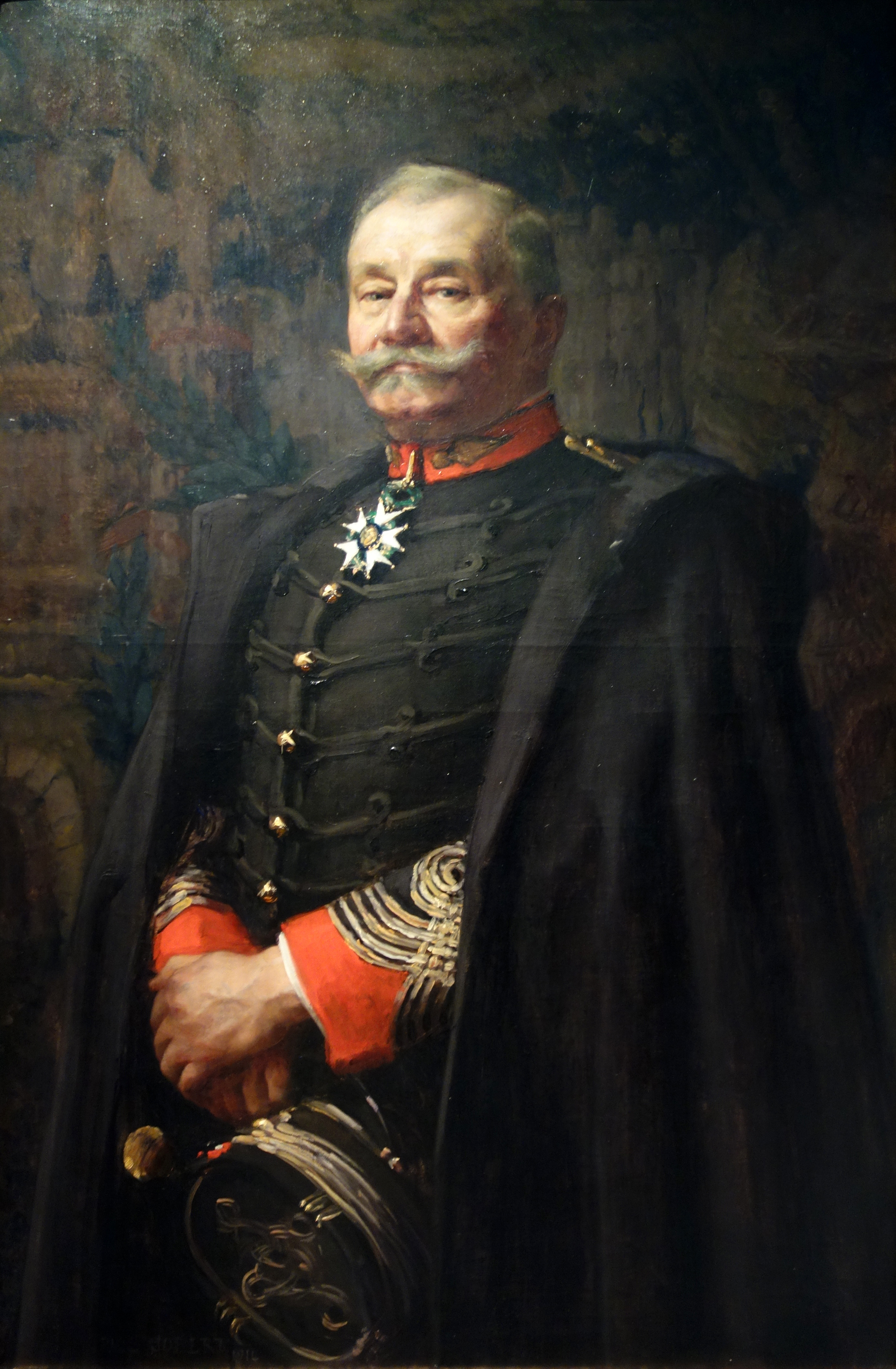
Lieutenant-colonel Joseph Albert Deport, the developer of the 75 mm field gun

The forerunner of the French 75 was an experimental 57 mm gun that was first assembled in September 1891 at the Bourges arsenal under the direction of Captain Sainte-Claire Deville. This 57 mm gun took advantage of a number of the most advanced artillery technologies available at the time:

1. Vieille's smokeless powder, which was introduced in 1884.
2. Self-contained ammunition, with the powder charge in a brass case which also held the shell.
3. An early hydro-pneumatic short recoil mechanism that was designed by Major Louis Baquet.
4. A rotating screw breech built under license from Thorsten Nordenfelt.

The only major design difference between the 57 and 75 that would emerge was the recoil system. But, in 1890, even before the 57 entered testing, General Mathieu, Director of Artillery at the Ministry of War, had been informed that Konrad Haussner, a German engineer working at the Ingolstadt arsenal, had patented an oil-and-compressed-air long-recoil system. They also learned that Krupp was considering introducing the system after testing it. Krupp would later reject Haussner's invention, due to unsolvable technical problems caused by hydraulic fluid leakage.

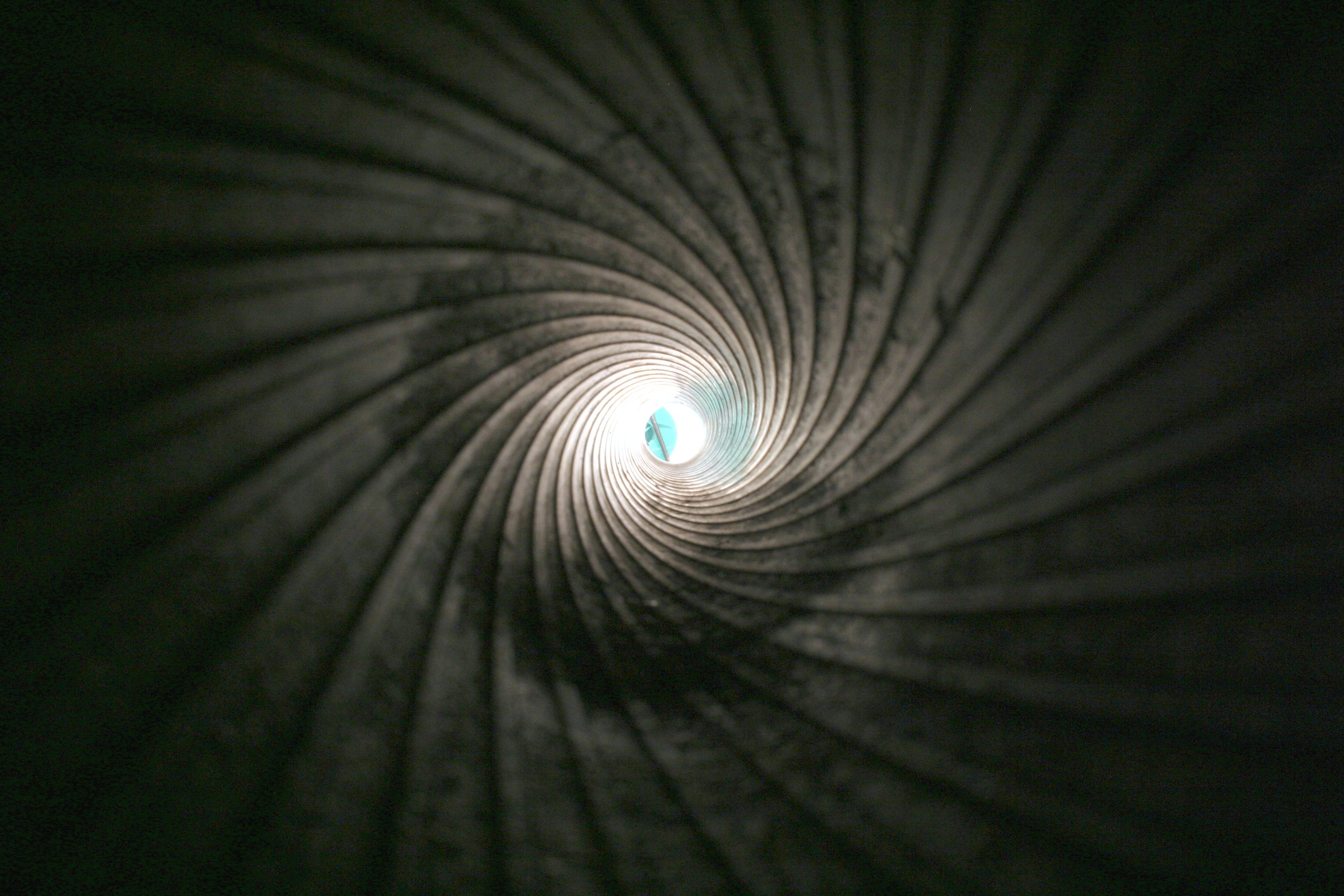
Rifling of a 75 modèle 1897

In 1891, Haussner sold his patents to a firm named Gruson, which searched for potential buyers. After reviewing the blueprints in February 1892, the French artillery engineers advised that a gun should be produced without purchasing the Haussner invention. Accordingly, General Mathieu turned to Lt. Colonel Joseph-Albert Deport, at the time the Director of the Atelier de Construction de Puteaux (APX), and asked him whether he could construct a gun on the general principle of the Haussner long-cylinder recoil without infringing the existing patents. After it was judged possible, a formal request was sent out on 13 July 1892.

It took five more years under the overall leadership of Mathieu's successor, General Deloye, to perfect and finally adopt in March 1898 an improved and final version of the Deport 75 mm long-recoil field gun. Various deceptions, some of them linked to the Dreyfus Case which erupted in 1894, had been implemented by Deloye and French counter-intelligence to distract German espionage.

The final experimental version of Deport's 75 mm field gun was tested during the summer of 1894 and judged very promising. Extensive trials, however, revealed that it was still prone to hydraulic fluid leakage from the long-recoil mechanism. The Deport 75 was returned to Puteaux arsenal for further improvements. Hydraulic fluid leakage was typical of this experimental phase of artillery development during the 1890s, as Haussner and Krupp had previously experienced.

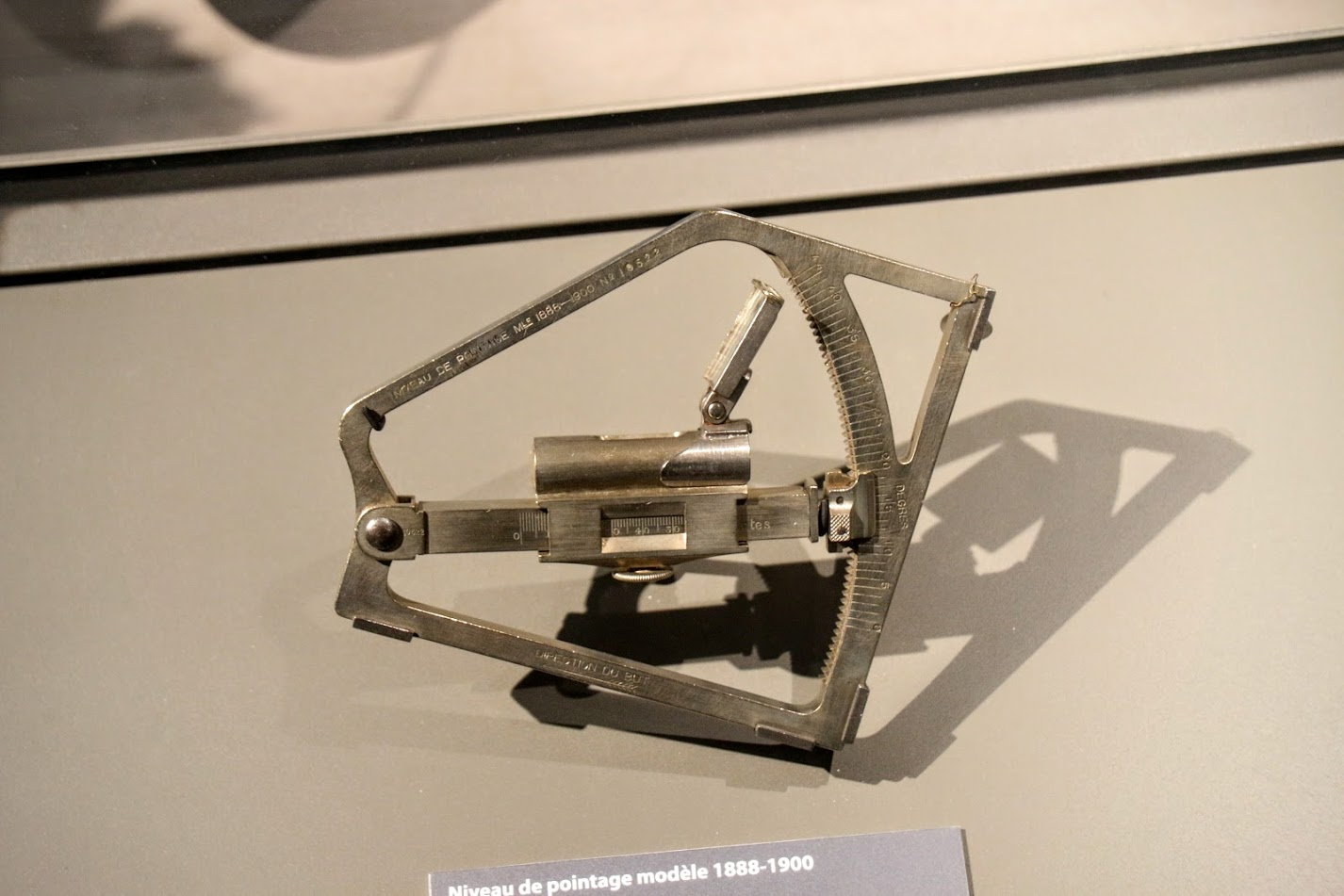
Range setting device

In December 1894, Deport was passed over for promotion, and resigned to join "Chatillon-Commentry", a private armaments firm. Two young military engineers from Ecole Polytechnique, Captains Etienne Sainte-Claire Deville and Emile Rimailho, continued development and introduced an improved version in 1896. Their contribution was a leakproof hydro-pneumatic long-recoil mechanism which they named "Frein II" (Brake # II). A major improvement was the placement of improved silver-alloy rings on the freely moving piston which separated the compressed air and the hydraulic fluid inside the main hydro-pneumatic recoil cylinder. These and other modifications achieved the desired result: the long-term retention of hydraulic fluid and compressed air inside the recoil system, even under the worst field conditions.

Captain Sainte-Claire Deville also designed important additional features, such as a device for piercing the fuzes of shrapnel shells automatically during the firing sequence (an "automatic fuze-setter"), thus selecting the desired bursting distance. The independent sight had also been perfected for easy field use by the crews, and a nickel-steel shield was added to protect the gunners. The armored caissons were designed to be tilted in order to present the shells horizontally to the crews. The wheel brakes could be swung under each wheel ("abattage"), and, together with the trail spade, they immobilized the gun during firing.

The gun was officially adopted on 28 March 1898 under the name "Matériel de 75 mm Mle 1897". The public saw it for the first time during the Bastille Day parade of 14 July 1899.

=== Hydro-pneumatic recoil mechanism ===
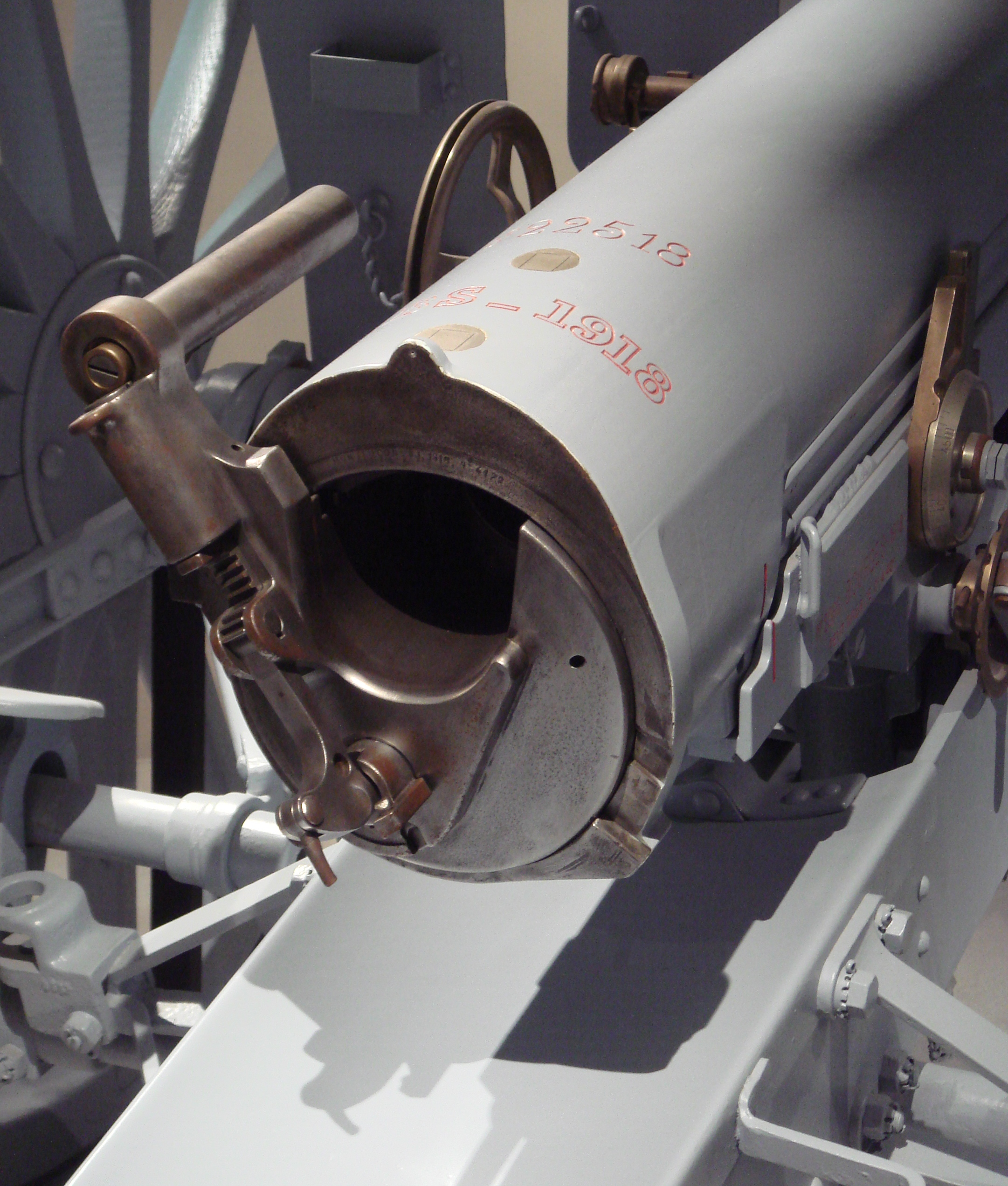
The Nordenfelt breech mechanism

The gun's barrel slid back on rollers, including a set at the muzzle, when the shot was fired. The barrel was attached near the breech to a piston rod extending into an oil-filled cylinder placed just underneath the gun. When the barrel recoiled, the piston was pulled back by the barrel's recoil and thus pushed the oil through a small orifice and into a second cylinder placed underneath. That second cylinder contained a freely floating piston which separated the surging oil from a confined volume of compressed air. During the barrel's recoil, the floating piston was forced forward by the oil, compressing the air even further. This action absorbed the recoil progressively as the internal air pressure rose and, at the end of recoil, generated a strong but decreasing back pressure that returned the gun forward to its original position. The smoothness of this system had no equal in 1897, and for at least another ten years. Each recoil cycle on the French 75, including the return forward, lasted about two seconds, permitting a maximum theoretical firing rate of about 30 rounds per minute.

The hydro-pneumatic system was treated as a state secret, and when the United States adopted the gun in 1917, the French military mission was reluctant to disclose the inner workings of the recoil system, leading one American officer to remark that "the French would sooner lose the war than lose the secret of the 75".

=== Ammunition ===
At the beginning in 1914, the French 75 fired two main types of shells, both with high muzzle velocities (535 m/s for the shrapnel shell) and a maximum range of 8,500 metres. Their relatively flat trajectories extended all the way to the designated targets. French 75 shells, at least initially in 1914, were essentially anti-personnel. They had been designed for the specific purpose of inflicting maximum casualties on enemy troops stationing or advancing in the open.

- A 5.3-kilogram (12 lb) impact-detonated, thin-walled steel, high-explosive (HE) shell with a time-delay fuze. It was filled with picric acid, known in France as "Melinite", used since 1888. The delay lasted five hundredths of a second, designed to detonate the shell in the air and at a man's height after bouncing forward off the ground. These shells were particularly destructive to men's lungs when exploding in their proximity.
- A 7.24-kilogram (16.0 lb) time-fused shrapnel shell containing 290 lead balls. The balls shot forward when the fuse's timer reached zero, ideally bursting high above the ground and enemy troops. During 1914 and 1915, the shrapnel shell was the dominant type of ammunition found in the French 75 batteries. However, by 1918, high-explosive shells had become virtually the sole type of 75 mm ammunition remaining in service.

Several new shells and fuses were introduced due to the demands of trench warfare. In 1918, a boat-tailed shell (with a superior ballistic coefficient) which could reach 11,000 metres (12,000 yd) was deployed for use during the latter part of the war. Developed through French artillery research, it increased the effective range of the French 75 by about thirty-eight percent.

Every shell, whether it be a high-explosive or shrapnel shell, was fixed to a brass case which was ejected when the breech was manually opened. Semi-automatic breech opening and shell ejection during recoil and return had not been developed yet.

=== Rapid fire capability ===
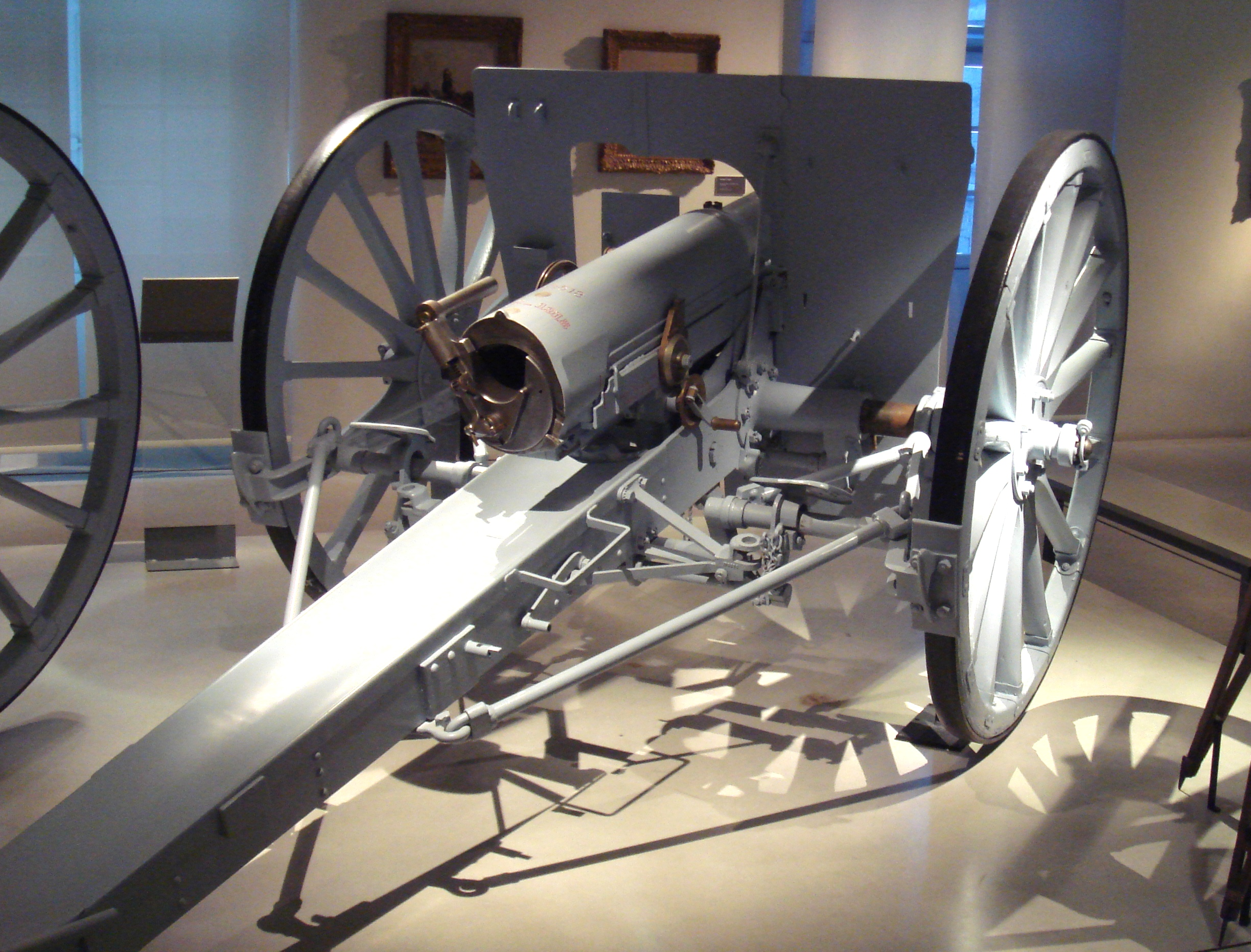
Rear view of the French 75

The French 75 introduced a new concept in artillery technology: rapid firing without realigning the gun after each shot. Older artillery had to be resighted after each shot in order to stay on target, and thus fired no more than two aimed shots per minute. The French 75 easily delivered fifteen aimed rounds per minute and could fire even faster for short periods of time, but the long-term sustained rate was 3-4 rounds per minute as more than this would overheat the barrel. This rate of fire, the gun's accuracy, and the lethality of the ammunition against personnel, made the French 75 superior to all other regimental field artillery at the time. When made ready for action, the first shot buried the trail spade and the two wheel anchors into the ground, following which all other shots were fired from a stable platform. Bringing down the wheel anchors tied to the braking system was called "abattage". The gun could not be elevated beyond eighteen degrees, unless the trail spade had been deeply dug into the ground; however, the 75 mm field gun was not designed for plunging fire. The gun could be traversed laterally 3 degrees to the sides by sliding the trail on the wheel's axle. Progressive traversing together with small changes in elevation could be carried out while continuously firing, called "fauchage" or "sweeping fire". A four-gun battery firing shrapnel could deliver 17,000 ball projectiles over an area 100 metres wide by 400 metres long in a single minute, with devastating results. Because of the gun's traversing ability, the greater the distance to the enemy concentration, the wider the area that could be swept.

== Service history ==
=== World War I service ===
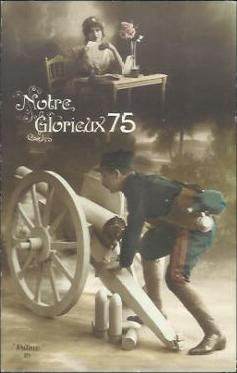
"Our glorious 75", propaganda postcard

Each Mle 1897 75 mm field gun battery of four guns consisted of 170 men led by four officers recruited among graduates of engineering schools. Enlisted men from the countryside were given charge of the six horses that pulled each gun and its first limber. Another six horses pulled each additional limber and caisson that were assigned to each gun. A battery included 160 horses, most of them pulling ammunition as well as repair and supply caissons.

The French artillery entered the war in August 1914 with more than 4,000 Mle 1897 75 mm field guns (1,000 batteries of four guns each). Over 17,500 Mle 1897 75 mm field guns were produced during World War I, over and above the 4,100 French 75s which were already deployed by the French Army in August 1914. All the essential parts, including the gun's barrel and the oleo-pneumatic recoil mechanisms were manufactured by French State arsenals: Puteaux, Bourges, Châtellerault and St Etienne. A truck-mounted anti-aircraft version of the French 75 was assembled by the automobile firm of De Dion-Bouton and adopted in 1913.

The total production of 75 mm shells during World War I exceeded 200 million rounds, mostly by private industry. In order to increase shell production from 20,000 rounds per day to 100,000 in 1915, the government turned to civilian contractors, and, as a result, shell quality deteriorated. This led to an epidemic of burst barrels which afflicted 75 mm artillery during 1915. Colonel Sainte-Claire Deville corrected the problem, which was due to microfissures in the bases of the shells, due to shortcuts in manufacturing. Shell quality was restored by September 1915, but never to the full exacting standards of pre-war manufacture.

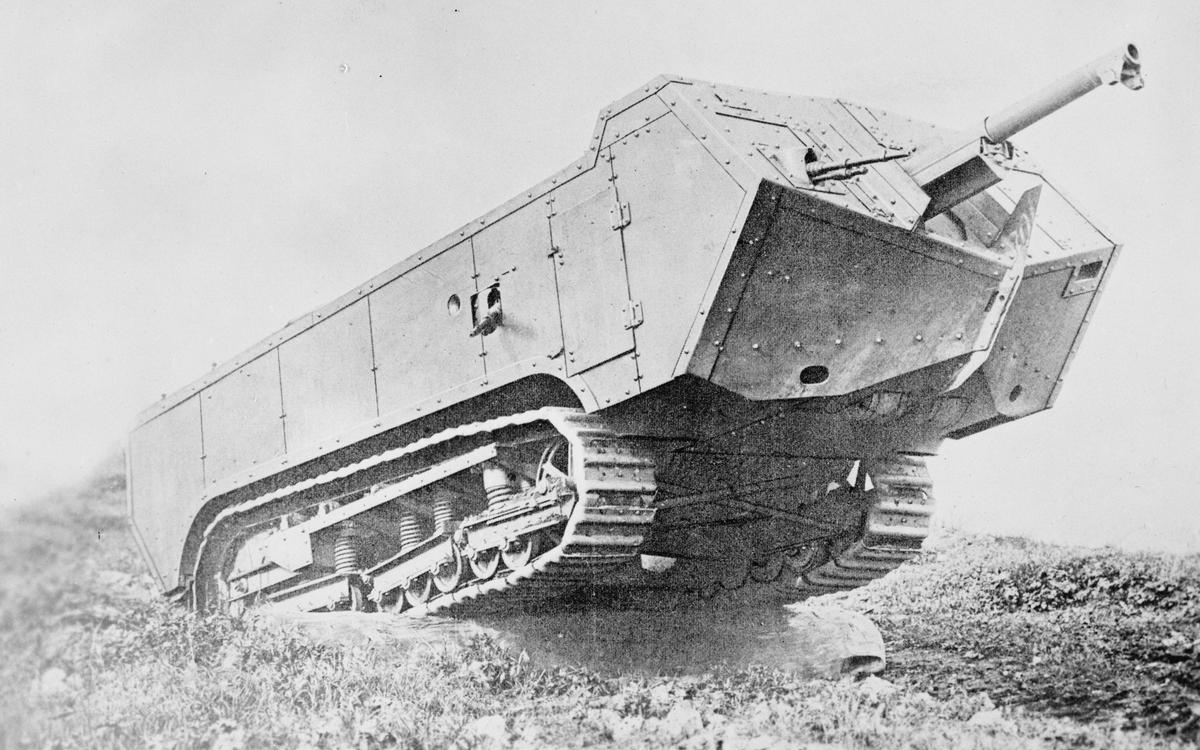
The M.1897 75 mm field gun was used as the main armament of the St Chamond tank, after the production of the 165th vehicle.

The French 75 was considered the best field gun of the war. It gave its best performances during the Battle of the Marne in August–September 1914 and at Verdun in 1916. At the time, the contribution of 75 mm artillery to these military successes, and thus to the French victories that ensued, was seen as significant. In the case of Verdun, over 1,000 French 75s (250 batteries) were constantly in action, night and day, on the battlefield during a period of nearly nine months. The total consumption of 75 mm shells at Verdun during the period February 21 to September 30, 1916, is documented by the public record at the Service Historique de l'Armée de Terre to have been in excess of 16 million rounds, or nearly 70% of all shells fired by French artillery during that battle. The French 75 was a devastating anti-personnel weapon against waves of infantry attacking in the open, as at the Marne and Verdun. However, its shells were comparatively light and lacked the power to obliterate trench works, concrete bunkers and deeply buried shelters. Thus, with time, the French 75 batteries became routinely used to cut corridors with high-explosive shells, across the belts of German barbed wire. After 1916, the 75 batteries became the carriers of choice to deliver toxic gas shells, including mustard gas and phosgene.

The French Army had to wait until early 1917 to receive in numbers fast-firing heavy artillery equipped with hydraulic recoil brakes (e.g. the 155 mm Schneider howitzer and the long-range Canon de 155 mm GPF). In the meantime, it had to make do with about four thousand de Bange 90 mm, 120 mm and 155 mm field and converted fortress guns, all without recoil brakes, that were effective but inferior in rate of fire to the more modern German heavy artillery.

=== Interwar service ===
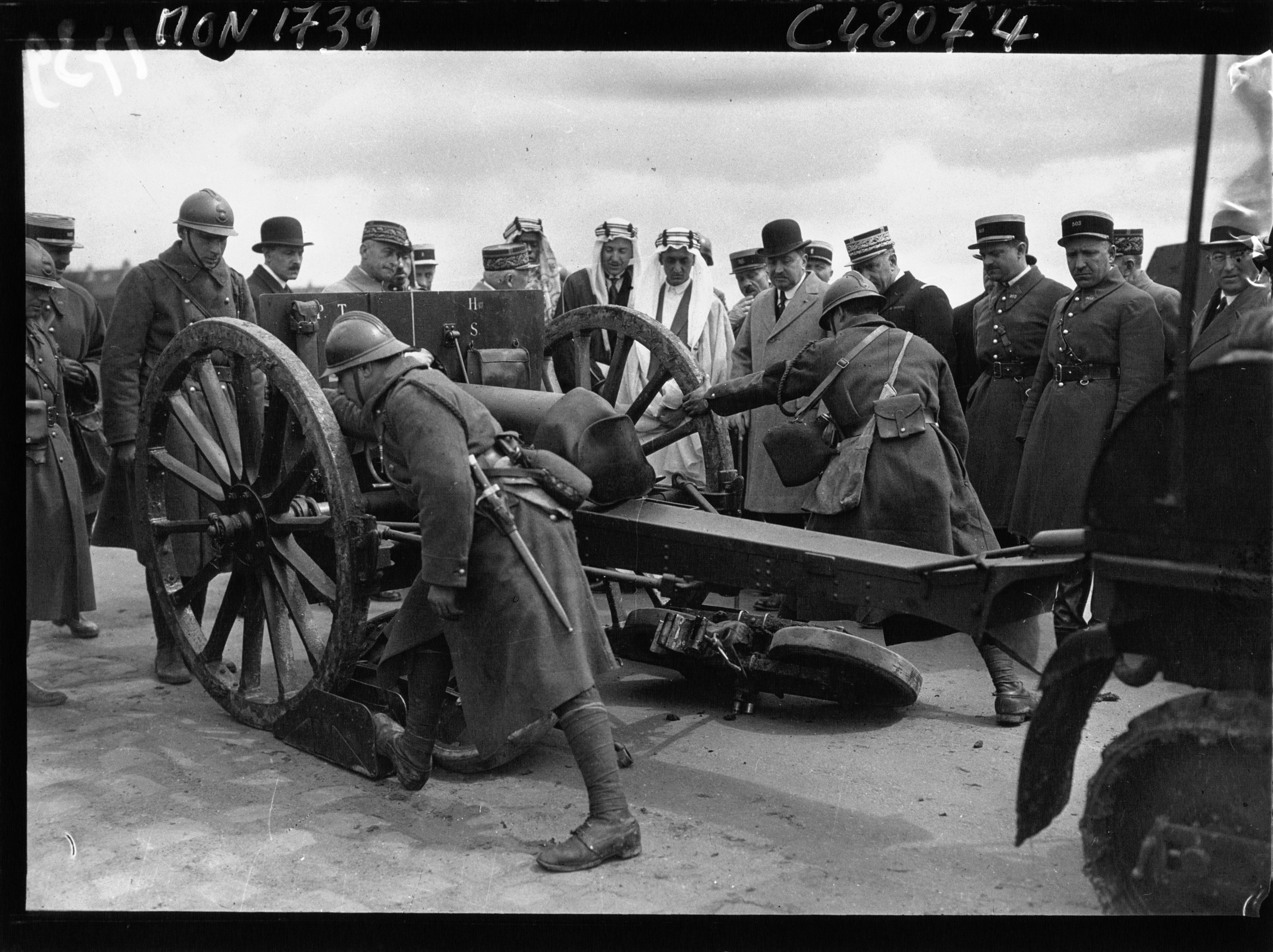
French Army Canon de 75 Mle 97 mounted on bogies, 1932.

During the interwar period, the French army kept the Mle 1897 in service and it continued to be the main gun of the French field artillery. The surplus guns were soon sold to allied countries.

Upgrades were considered in the 1920s, such as the use of a split trail carriages. The prototypes were satisfactory but the French Army decided not to fund the improvements, choosing instead to develop a new model. That new plan was abandoned after the 1920s budget cuts.

However, a few Mle 1897 guns were modernized between the wars. The Rif War showed the vulnerability of the crew against snipers during guerilla operations. The roues métalliques DAG, solid metallic wheels, were developed in the late 1920s to offer more protection to the crew, although they were very noisy during movements. They were mostly sent to units serving in the North African colonies. From 1928, the French Army also adopted bogies to enable transport by motor vehicles, such as the Citroën-Kégresse P17. Mounted on the bogies, the guns could be towed at a maximum speed of 30 km/h on the road but the removal of the bogies was complicated.

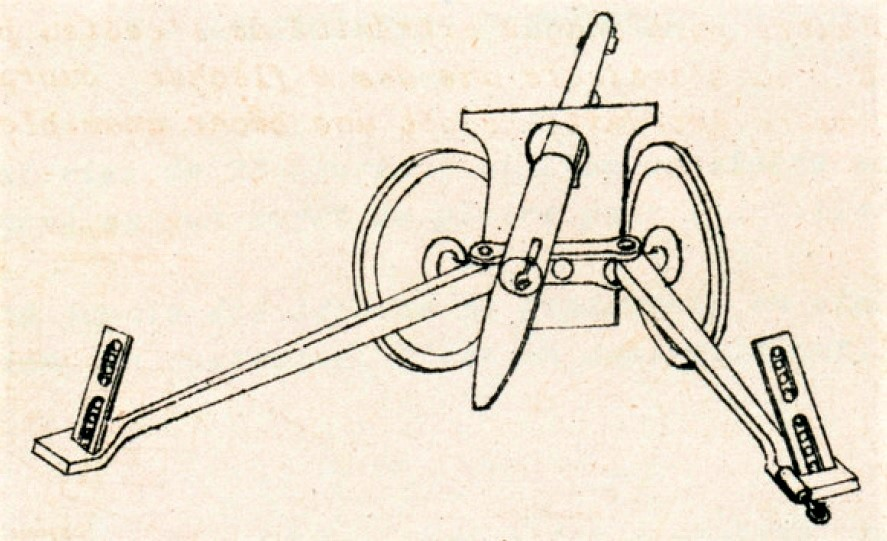
Canon de 75 Mle 1897/33

A more modern version of the Mle 1897, the Canon de 75 Mle 1897/33, mounted the original barrel and recoil mechanism on a new split-trail carriage. In addition to the new carriage the Mle 1897/33 had a new gun shield, pneumatic tires, sprung suspension, and the wheels "toed in" when the trails were spread. The new carriage offered higher angles of traverse and elevation than the earlier box-trail carriage. However, the Mle 1897/33 was inferior to the new Canon de 105 C Mle 1935 B that used the same carriage, so it was only built in small numbers. A more modest upgrade to the Mle 1897 was the Canon de 75 Mle 1897/38, which was a modernized field artillery variant. The original box-trail carriage was retained but the gun had a new gun shield, sprung suspension and pneumatic tires for motor transport. The 75 Mle 1897 was also considered as a possible anti-tank gun by the French Army, who in 1936 ordered a new circular platform, the plateforme Arbel Mle 1935. Mounted on that platform, the Mle 1897 gun could now quickly traverse to engage enemy tanks.

During this period, a number of the guns entered Irish service, being sourced from Britain.

=== World War II service ===
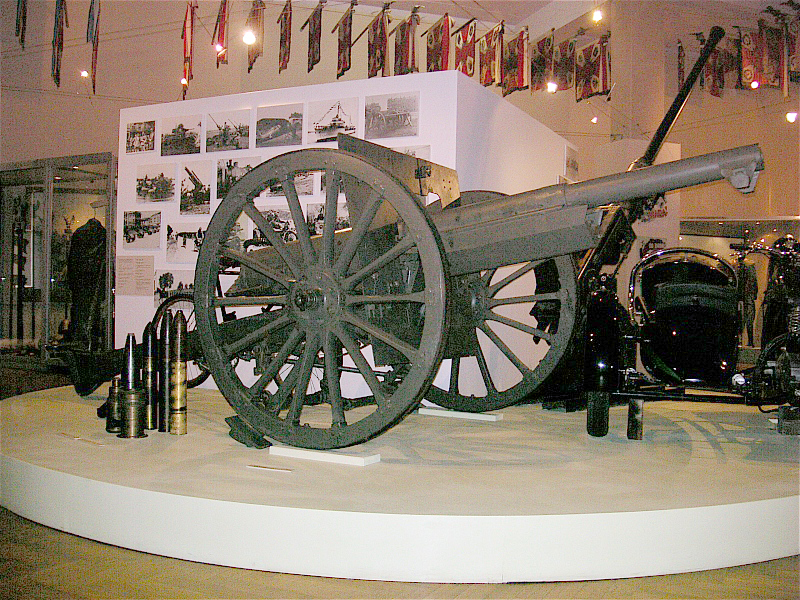
A 75 mm armata wz.1897 in the Polish Army Museum, Warsaw.

Despite obsolescence brought on by new developments in artillery design, large numbers of 75s were still in use in 1939 (4,500 in the French Army alone), and they eventually found their way into a number of unlikely places. A substantial number had been delivered to Poland in 1919–20, together with infantry ordnance, in order to fight in the Polish-Soviet War. They were known as 75 mm armata wz.1897. In 1939 the Polish army had 1,374 of these guns, making it by far the most numerous artillery piece in Polish service.

Many were captured by Germany during the Fall of France in 1940, in addition to Polish guns captured in 1939. Over 3,500 were modified with a muzzle brake and mounted on a 5 cm Pak 38 carriage, now named 7.5 cm Pak 97/38 they were used by the Wehrmacht in 1942 as an emergency weapon against the Soviet Union's T-34 and KV tanks. Its relatively low velocity and a lack of modern armor-piercing ammunition limited its effectiveness as an anti-tank weapon. When the German 7.5 cm Pak 40 became available in sufficient numbers, most remaining Pak 97/38 pieces were returned to occupied France to reinforce the Atlantic Wall defenses or were supplied to Axis nations like Romania (PAK 97/38) and Hungary. Non-modified remainders were used as second-line and coastal artillery pieces under the German designation 7.5 cm FK 231(f) and 7,5 cm FK 97(p). The few 60 Mle 1897/33s captured by the Germans were given the designation 7.5 cm K232(f).

=== British service ===
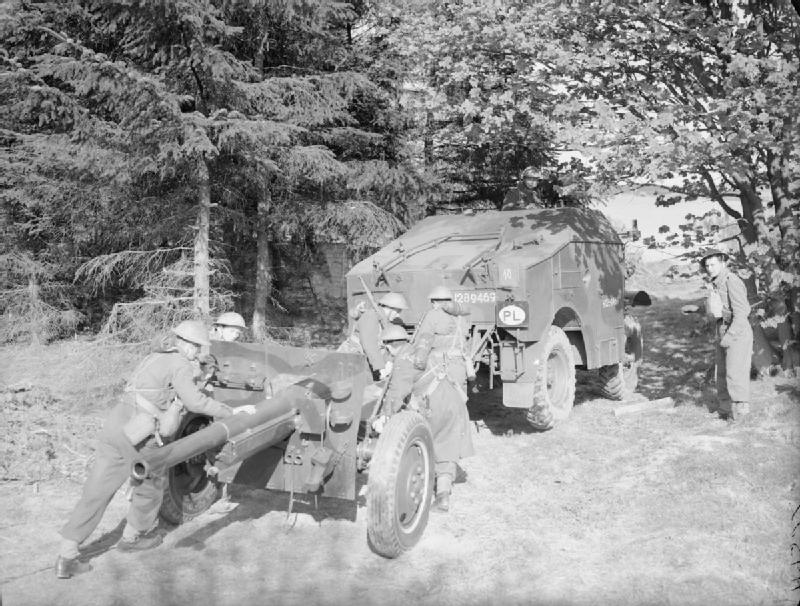
Gunners of the 1st Polish Corps hitching their French-built 75 mm field gun to a Morris-Commercial C8 'Quad' artillery tractor during a training exercise.

In 1915, Britain acquired a number of "autocanon de 75 mm mle 1913" anti-aircraft guns, as a stopgap measure while it developed its own anti-aircraft alternatives. They were used in the defence of Britain, usually mounted on de Dion motor lorries using the French mounting, which the British referred to as the "Breech Trunnion". Britain also purchased a number of the standard 75 mm guns and adapted them for AA use using a Coventry Ordnance Works mounting, the "Centre Trunnion". At the Armistice, there were 29 guns in service in Britain.

In June 1940, with many British field guns lost in the Battle of France, 895 M1897 field guns and a million rounds of ammunition were purchased from the U.S. Army. For political purposes, the sale to the British Purchasing Commission was made through the US Steel Corporation. The basic, unmodified gun was known in British service as "Ordnance, QF, 75 mm Mk 1", although many of the guns were issued to units on converted or updated mountings. They were operated by field artillery and anti-tank units. Some of the guns had their wheels and part of their carriages cut away so that they could be mounted on a pedestal called a "Mounting, 75 mm Mk 1". These weapons were employed as light coastal artillery and were not declared obsolete until March 1945.

During World War II, through Lend Lease, the British received 170 American half-track M3 gun motor carriage, which mounted a 75 mm; they used these in Italy and Northern Europe until the end of the war as fire-support vehicles in armoured car regiments.

=== Romanian service ===
Romania had a considerable number of World War I guns of 75 mm and 76.2 mm. Some models were modernized at Resita works in 1935 including French md. 1897. The upgrade was made with removable barrels. Several types of guns of close caliber were barreled to use the best ammunition available for 75 mm caliber, explosive projectile model 1917 "Schneider". The new barrel was made of steel alloy with chrome and nickel with excellent mechanical resistance to pressure which allowed, after modifying the firing brake, the recovery arch and the sighting devices an increase of the range from 8.5 km to 11.2 km and a rate of fire of 20 rounds/minute. These upgraded field guns were used in all infantry divisions in World War II, additionally these guns also used Costinescu 75 mm anti-tank round.

=== U.S. service ===
==== World War I ====
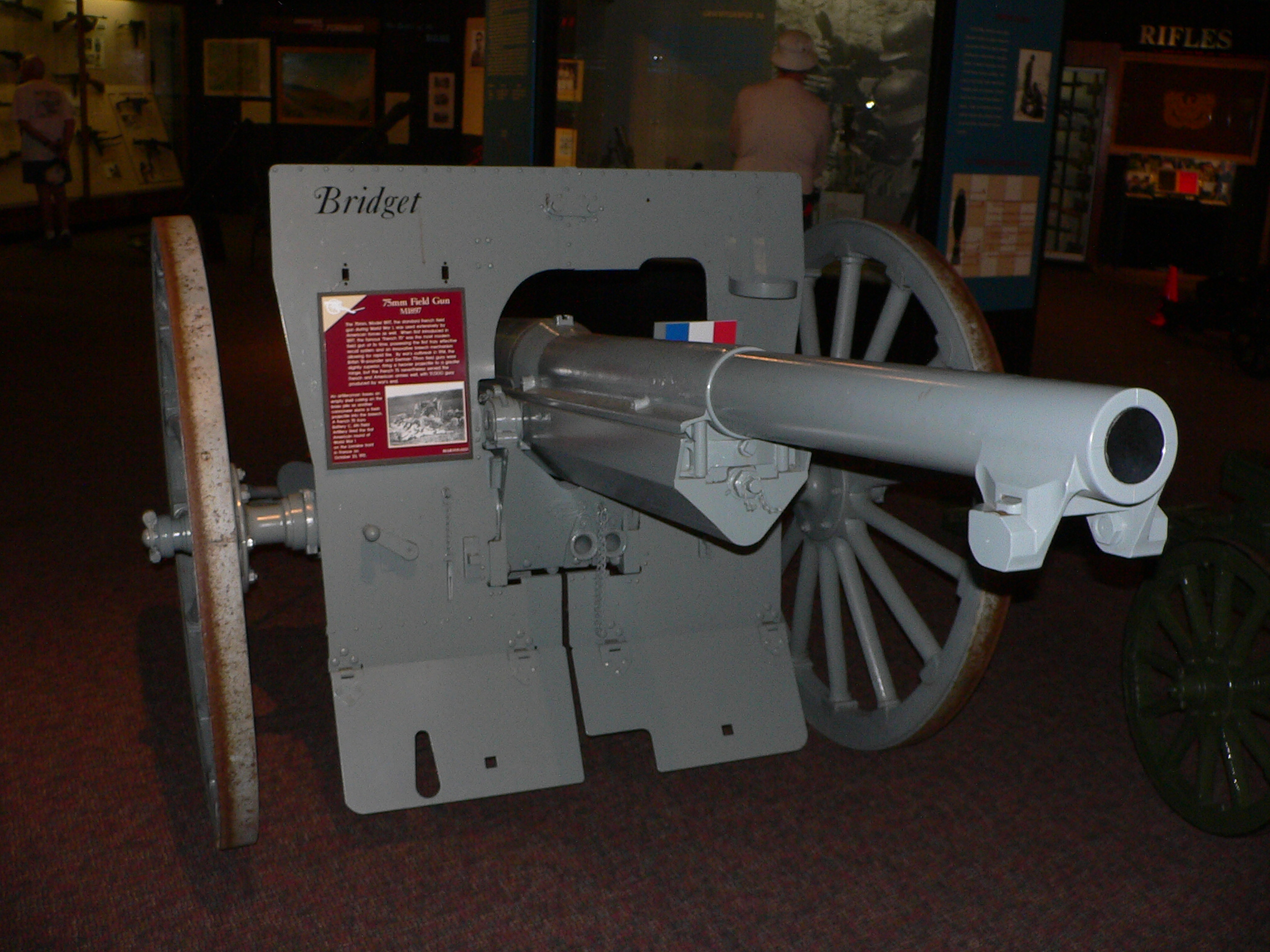
"Bridget" in 2007

Newsreel footage of U.S. gunners preparing a gun position and then engaging in rapid fire in World War I.

The U.S. Army adopted the French 75 mm field gun during World War I and used it extensively in battle. The U.S. designation of the basic weapon was 75 mm Gun M1897. There were 480 American 75 mm field gun batteries (over 1,900 guns) on the battlefields of France in November 1918. Manufacture of the French 75 by American industry began in the spring of 1918 and quickly built up to an accelerated pace. Carriages were built by Willys-Overland, the hydro-pneumatic recuperators by Singer Manufacturing Company and Rock Island Arsenal, the cannon itself by Symington-Anderson and Wisconsin Gun Company. American industry built 1,050 French 75s during World War I, but only 143 had been shipped to France by 11 November 1918; most American batteries used French-built 75s in action.

The first U.S. artillery shots in action in World War I were fired by Battery C, 6th Field Artillery on October 23, 1917, with a French 75 named "Bridget" which is preserved today at the United States Army Ordnance Museum. During his service with the American Expeditionary Forces, Captain (and future U.S. President) Harry S. Truman commanded a battery of French 75s.

==== Interwar and World War II ====
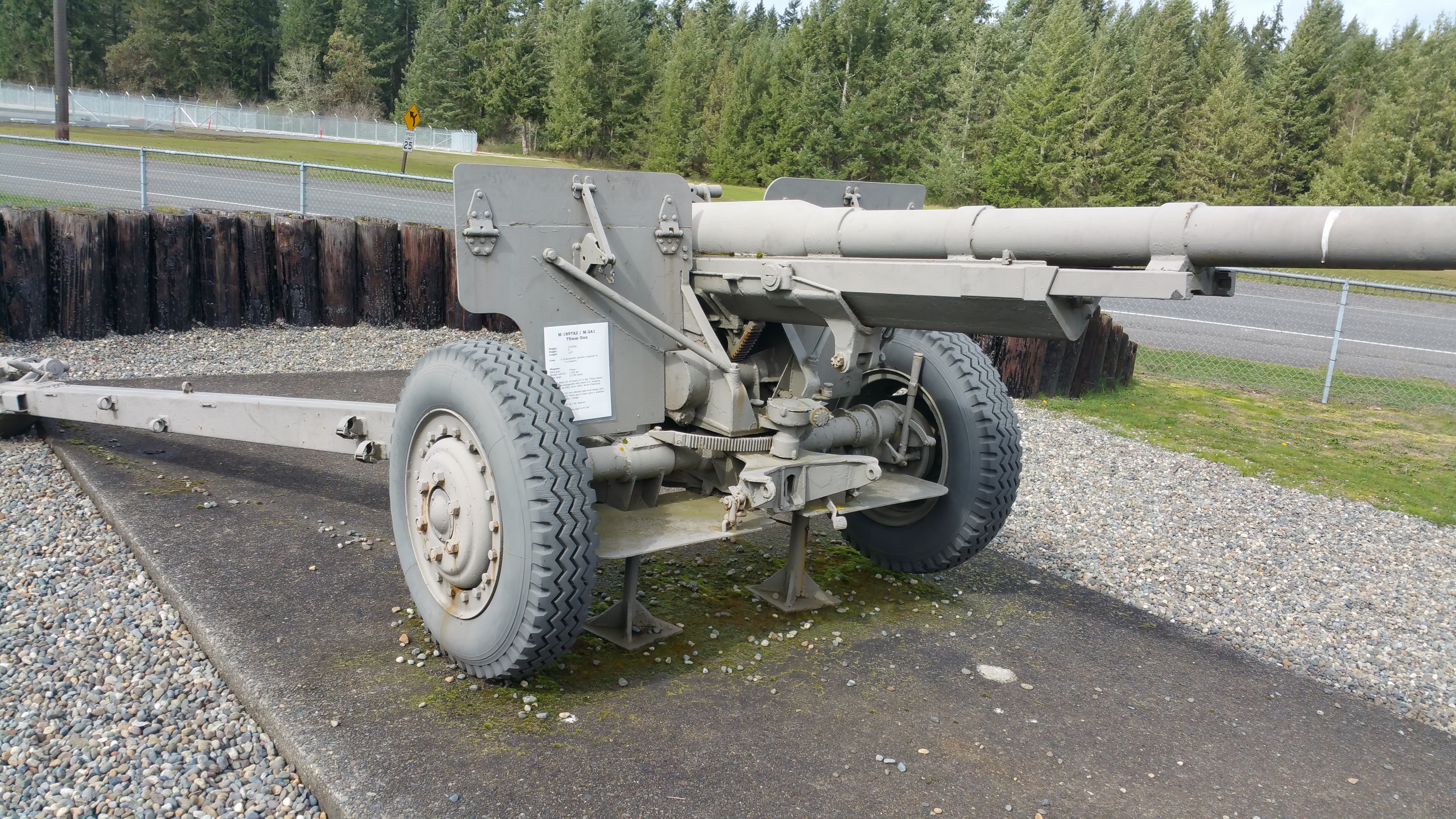
M1897 on an M2A2 anti-tank gun carriage.

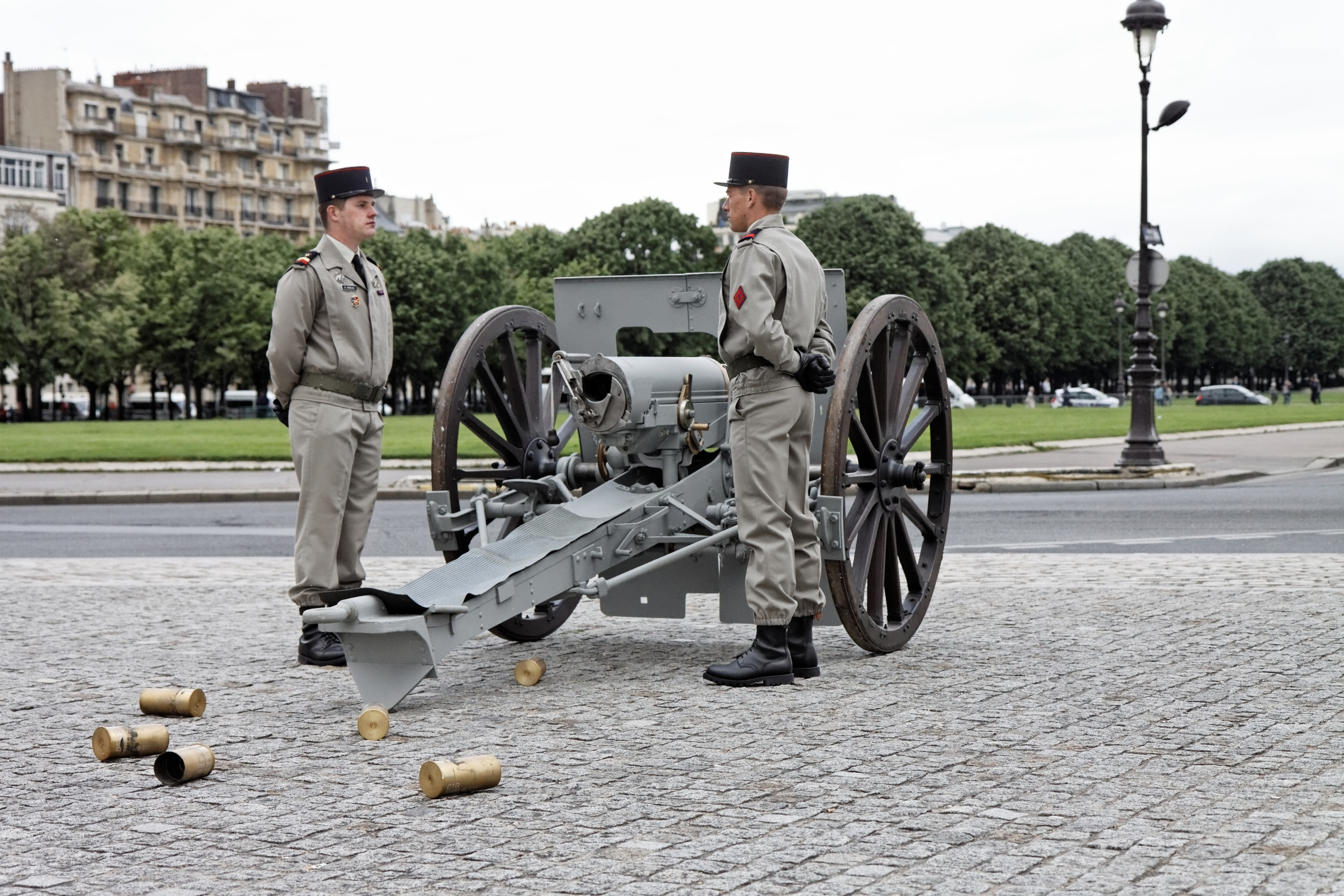
A mle 1897 Saluting gun, in front of the Invalides after firing a 21-gun salute in honor of François Hollande's presidential inauguration.

By the early 1930s, the only U.S. artillery units that remained horse-drawn were those assigned to infantry and cavalry divisions. During the 1930s, most M1897A2 and A3 (French made) and M1897A4 (American made) guns were subsequently modernized for towing behind trucks by mounting it on the modern carriage M2A2 which featured a split trail, pneumatic rubber tires allowing towing at any speed, an elevation limit increased to 45 degrees, and traverse increased to 30 degrees left and right. Along with new ammunition, these features increased the effective range and allowed the gun to be used as an anti-tank gun, in which form it equipped the first tank destroyer battalions.

In 1941, these guns began to become surplus when they were gradually being replaced by the M2A1 105 mm M101 split-trail Howitzer; some were removed from their towed carriages and installed on the M3 Half-Track as the M3 gun motor carriage (GMC) tank destroyers. However, equipment shortages led to the M1897s remaining in the inventory of U.S. Army units in the Philippine Islands as well as in artillery units of the Philippine Army as of December 1941, and they would be used in action against the Japanese before the Allied forces in the Philippines surrendered in May 1942. M3 GMCs were used in the Pacific theater during the Battle for the Philippines and by Marine Regimental Weapons Companies until 1944. The M3 GMC also formed the equipment of the early American tank destroyer battalions during operations in North Africa and Italy, and continued in use with the British in Italy and in small numbers in Northern Europe until the end of the war. Many others were used for training until 1942.

The 75 mm M2 and M3 tank guns of the M3 Lee and M4 Sherman Medium tanks, the 75 mm M6 tank gun of the M24 Chaffee light tank and the 75 mm gun of the -G and -H subtypes of the B-25 Mitchell bomber all used the same ammunition as the M1897. The 75 mm Pack Howitzer M1 used the same projectiles fired from a smaller 75×272R case.

=== Post-war usage ===
After World War II, the Canon de 75 modèle 1897 remained in service or kept in reserve with a few countries in Africa, Asia, and Latin America including: Cameroon, Cambodia, Laos, Mexico, Morocco, and Upper Volta (modern Burkina Faso) as late as 1977.

The gun is still used in France as a saluting gun. When the French Army discarded its 105 HM2 howitzers to replace them with MO-120-RT mortars, only 155 mm artillery pieces remained, for which no blank cartridges were available. The Army therefore recommissioned two Canon de 75 modèle 1897, then located at the Musée de l'Artillerie de Draguignan. They are used for state ceremonies.

== Variants and derivatives ==
=== Naval and coastal artillery ===
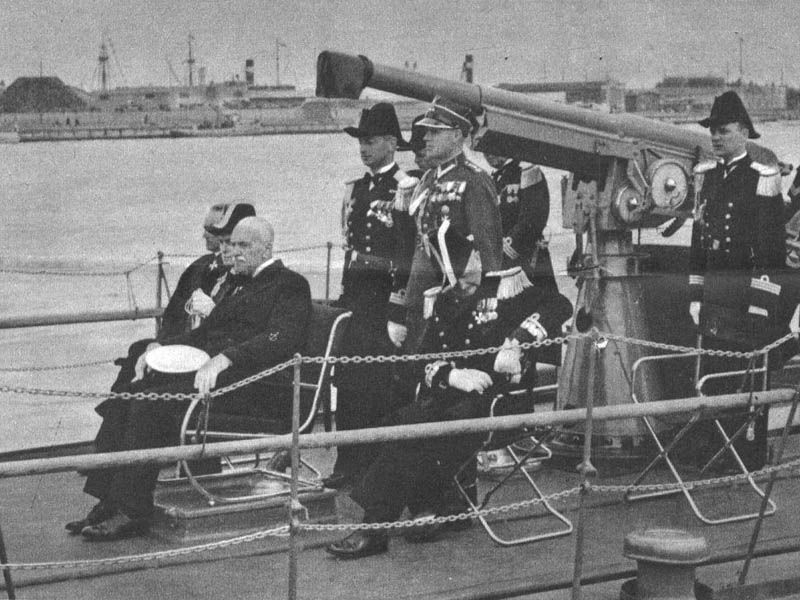
A navalized mle 1897 on board the Polish torpedo boat ORP Mazur

The French Navy adopted the 75 mm modèle 1897 for its coastal batteries and warships

The 75 mm modèle 1897–1915 was placed on SMCA modèle 1925 mountings with a vertical elevation of -10 to +70° and a 360° rotation. This allowed it to be used in an anti-aircraft role.

New 75 mm guns were developed specifically for anti-aircraft use. The 75 mm modèle 1922, 75 mm modèle 1924 and 75 mm modèle 1927 of 50 calibre were developed from the 62.5 calibre '75 mm Schneider modèle 1908' mounted on the Danton-class battleships.

=== Field artillery ===
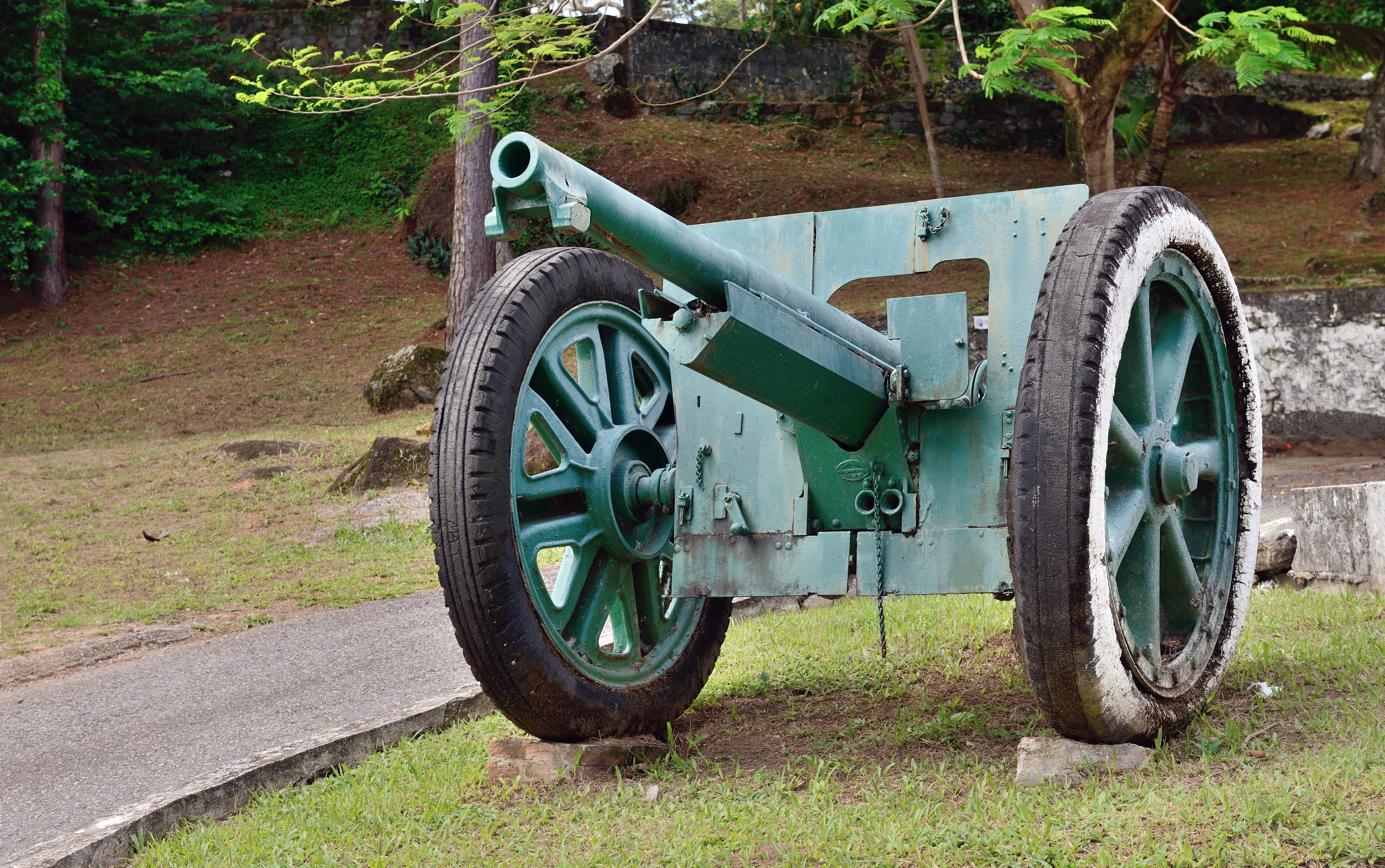
Canon de 75 modèle 1897 modifié 1938 in Fort Cépérou.

- Canon de 75 mm mle 1897 à roues métalliques DAG – Variant with solid metallic wheels to protect the crew from small arms fire.
- Canon de 75 mm mle 1897 modifié 1933 − Export variant produced for Mexico. The pole trail carriage was replaced with a simple split trail with pneumatic tires for motorized towing, and a gun shield was included to provide some protection for the crew
- Canon de 75 mm mle 1897 modifié 1938 – Motorized artillery variant with wooden wheels replaced by metallic wheels with pneumatic tires, altered shield

=== Anti-tank ===
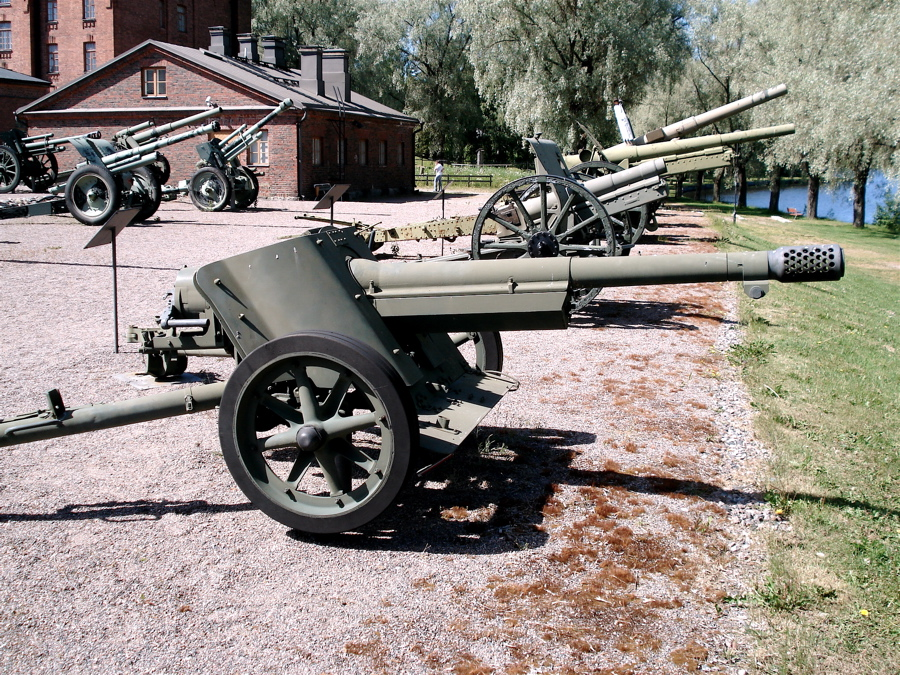
7.5 cm Pak 97/38 anti-tank gun featured a large muzzle brake

- Canon de 75 mm mle 1897 sur plateforme Arbel modèle 1935 – A version mounted on a circular platform for quick traverse. Also called the Plateformes de campagne de canons 75 Mle 1897.
- 7.5 cm Pak 97/38 – Several thousand captured French guns were modified by the Germans during World War II as makeshift anti-tank guns, by adding a Swiss-designed muzzle brake and mounting it on German-built carriages.
- 75 mm field gun M1897 on M2 carriage – During the 1930s, most M1897A2, M1897A3 and M1897A4 guns were subsequently modernized for towing behind trucks by mounting it on the modern carriage M2A2 which featured a split trail, pneumatic rubber tires.

=== Anti-aircraft ===
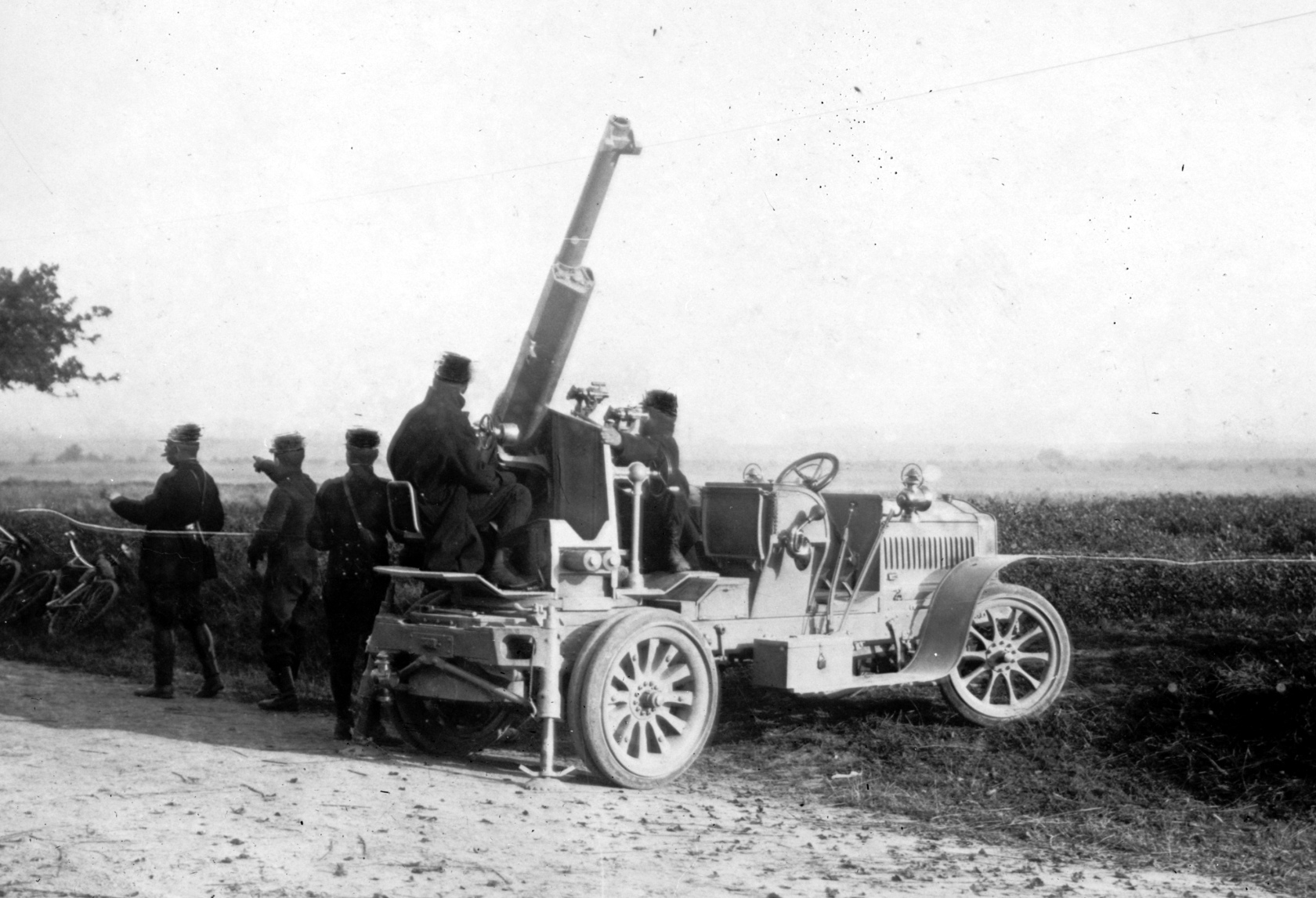
A De Dion-Bouton self-propelled gun

- Autocanon de 75 mm mle 1913 – Self-propelled anti-aircraft variant, on De Dion-Bouton chassis using Canon de 75 antiaérien mle 1913-1917.
- Canon de 75 mm contre-aéroplanes sur plateforme mle 1915 – Static anti-aircraft variant on rotating platform
- Canon de 75 mm contre-aéroplanes mle 1917 – Anti-aircraft variant on 1-axle trailer with stabilizer legs.

== Users ==
- Belgium
- Cambodia
- Cameroon
- China
- Ecuador
- Estonia
- Finland
- France
- Germany
- Greece
- Laos
- Lithuania
- Mexico − Produced under license as the M97/33
- Morocco
- Peru
- Poland
- Portugal
- Romania
- Serbia
- Spain
- United Kingdom
- United States
- Upper Volta
- Yugoslavia

== See also ==
- French 75 (cocktail), named for the gun
- QF 18-pounder gun, British gun of similar abilities
