= Joseph-Albert Deport =

French artilleryman

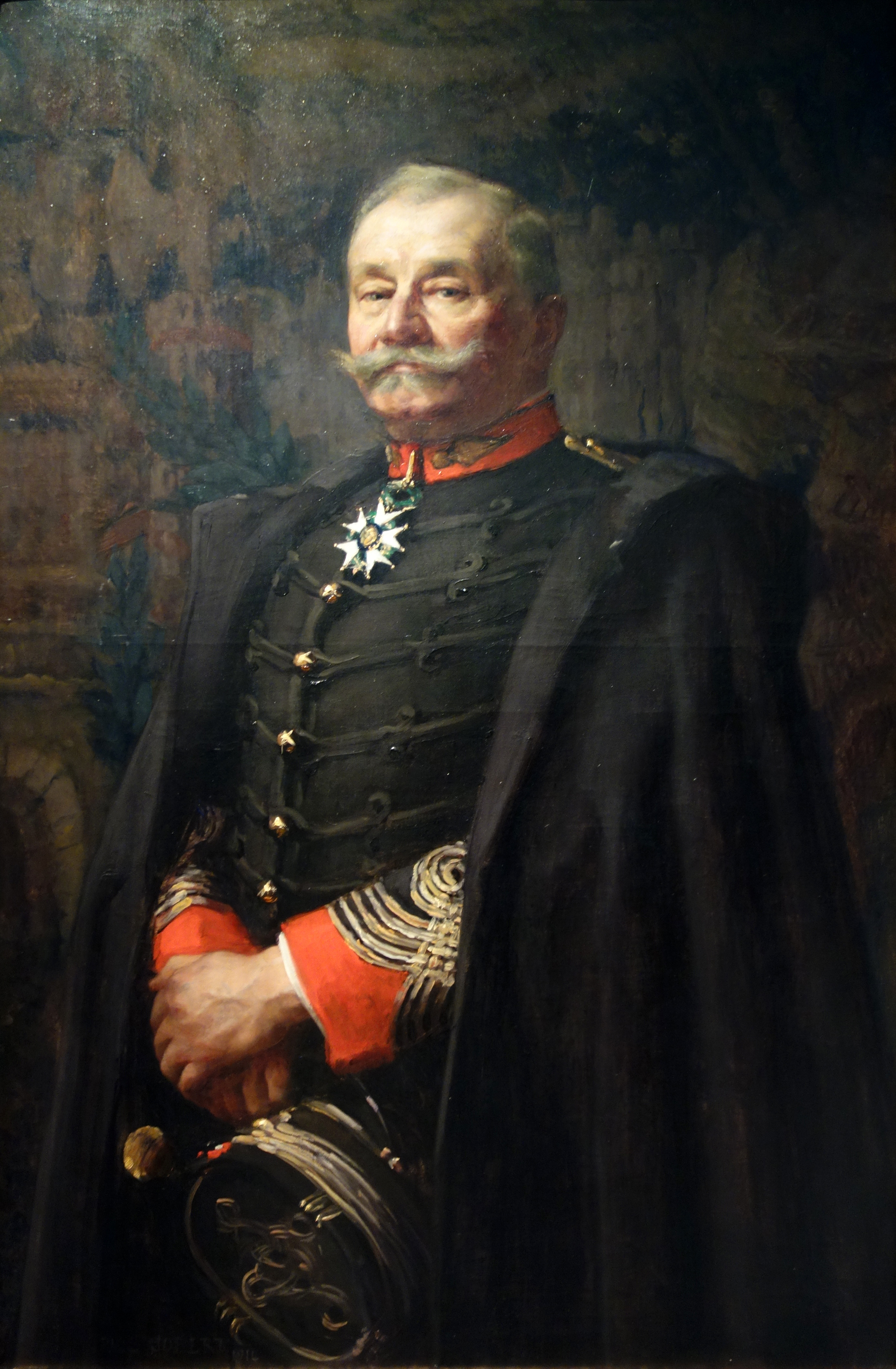
Le lieutenant-colonel Joseph Albert Deport - Paul Jobert

Joseph-Albert Deport (September 17, 1846 – November 1, 1926) was a French officer and engineer best known as one of designers of the Canon de 75 modèle 1897.

== Biography ==
He was born on September 17, 1846, in Saint-Loup-sur-Semouse. He attended the École Polytechnique in 1866–1868. He began his career of an artillery officer in 1870 during the Franco-Prussian War; wounded in combat, he was made a cavaler of the Legion of Honor.

After the war he rose up in ranks until appointed director of the Atelier de Construction de Puteaux state arsenal. There he was promoted to lieutenant-colonel and started the design process of the quick-firing 75-mm gun that was later designated modèle 1897. However, he resigned from the French Army in 1894 in order to move to the private industry after he was passed up for further promotion, so he did not participate in the further design of the gun.

His most important invention at the Société des forges de Châtillon-Commentry-Neuves-Maisons, where he worked afterwards, was the now-universally adopted split-trail carriage for artillery pieces, patented in 1907-1908, and his most important design was the first split-trail gun in the world, Italian Cannone da 75/27 modello 11 used in both WWI and WWII. He died on November 1, 1926.
