= M3 Gun Motor Carriage =

American tank destroyer

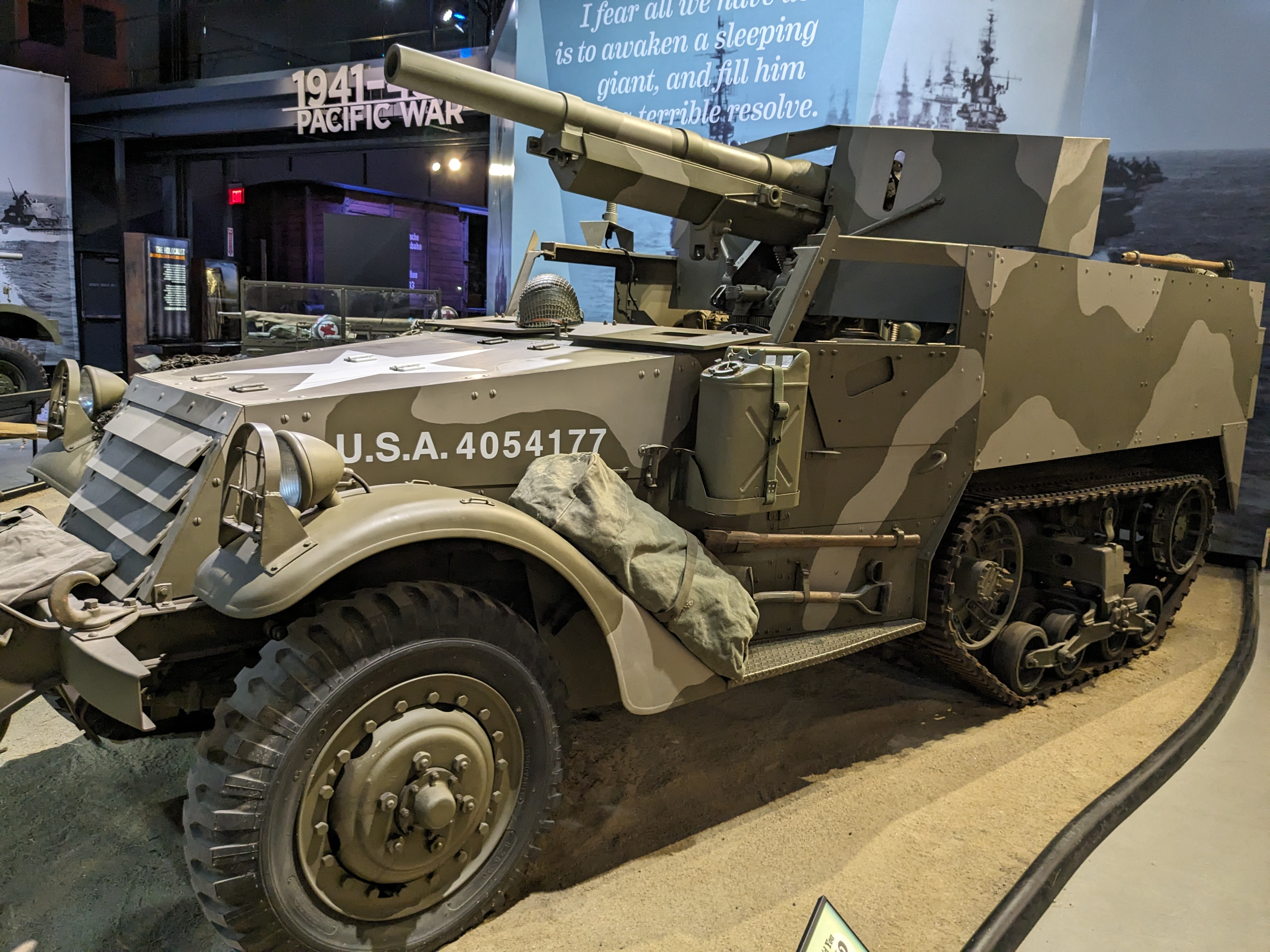
- M3A1 GMC on display at the American Heritage Museum in Stow, Massachusetts, USA.
- Type: Tank destroyer
- Place of origin: United States

Service history
- In service: 1941–1945
- Used by: United States; Free France; Empire of Japan; United Kingdom
- Wars: World War II

Production history
- Designer: Ordnance Department
- Designed: 1940–1941
- Manufacturer: Autocar Company
- Produced: August–September 1941; February 1942 – April 1943
- No. built: 2,202; (1,360 converted to M3A1 Half-track)

Specifications
- Mass: 20,000 lb (9.1 t)
- Length: 20.46 ft (6.24 m)
- Width: 7.29 ft (2.22 m)
- Height: 8.17 ft (2.49 m) (including gun shield)
- Crew: 5 men: Commander (Cab right); Driver (Cab left); Gunner (Rear left); Assistant gunner (Rear right); Loader (Rear)
- Elevation: M3: -10° / +29°; M3A1: -6.5° / +29°
- Traverse: M3: 19° left / 21° right; M3A1: 21° left / 21° right
- Armor: 0.25–0.625 in (6.4–15.9 mm)
- Main armament: 1× 75 mm (3.0 in) M1897A4 gun (w/ 59 rounds)
- Engine: White 160AX, 386 in^{3} (6,330 cc), 6-cylinder, compression ratio: 6.44:1; 147 hp (110 kW)
- Power/weight: 14.7 hp/ton
- Transmission: Constant mesh
- Suspension: Semi-ellipitical longitudinal leaf spring for wheels and vertical volute springs for tracks
- Ground clearance: 11.2 in (280 mm)
- Fuel capacity: 60 US gal (230 L)
- Operational range: ~ 200 mi (320 km)
- Maximum speed: 47 mph (75 km/h)

The M3 Gun Motor Carriage (M3 GMC) was a United States Army tank destroyer equipped with a 75 mm M1897A4 gun, which was built by the Autocar Company during World War II.

== Specifications ==
The M3 GMC was 20.46 feet (6.24 m) long, 7.29 feet (2.22 m) wide, 8.17 feet (2.49 m) high (including the gun shield), and weighed 20,000 pounds (9.1 t). Its suspension consisted of semi-elliptical longitudinal leaf springs for the wheels and vertical volute springs for the tracks, while its transmission consisted of constant mesh. Its ground clearance was 11.2 inches (280 mm).

It had a White 160AX 147 horsepower (110 kW), 386 cubic inch (6,330 cc), 6-cylinder engine with a compression ratio of 6.44:1. It had a 150-mile (240 km) range, 60 US gal (230 L) fuel tank, a speed of 47 mph (75 km/h), and a power to weight ratio of 14.7 hp per ton.

It was armed with one 75 mm M1897A4 with 59 rounds, had 0.25–0.625 in (6.4–15.9 mm) of armor, and a crew of five consisting of a commander, gunner, two loaders, and a driver. The M3 (with the M2A3 mount) could traverse 19° left and 21° right, elevate 29° and depress −10°. The M3A1 (using the M5 mount) could traverse 21° in both directions, but could only depress −6.5°. Firing the M61 armor piercing round, the gun could penetrate up to 3 inches (76 mm) of armor at 1,000 yards (910 m).

== Development ==
=== T12 / M3 ===
After the fall of France, the U.S. Army studied the reasons behind the effectiveness of the German campaign against the French and British forces. One aspect that was highlighted by this study was the use of armored vehicles and self propelled artillery. However by 1941 there was little available in the U.S. Army's arsenal that could be used in such a role, the US Army decided that it required a 75 mm self-propelled gun. The Army had a number of M1897A5 guns, sufficient for the mass-production for such a weapon, and the M3 half-track was coming into production. After some debate, the Army decided to place M1897A5 guns on the M3 half-track chassis, which was designated the T12 GMC. The M1897A5 gun was originally adapted for the M3 chassis by placing it in a welded box riveted to the chassis behind the driver's compartment. It was accepted by the Army on 31 October 1941.

A batch of 36 T12s was used for testing, while another 50 were built and transported to the Philippines. The 36 T12s were improved in multiple ways. The improvements included the inclusion of a mount that raised the gun shield, the replacement of the original gun shield with a gun shield from the M2A3 (a carriage for the M1897A4), and the addition of a 0.5 in (12.7 mm) M2 Browning machine gun, which was later removed. After the final improvements were finished, the prototype vehicles were sent to the Autocar Company for production. The new vehicle entered production under the name M3 Gun Motor Carriage (or M3 GMC).

=== M3A1 ===
As the existing supply of M2A3 gun shields was insufficient to meet requirements for the production of the M3, the Ordnance Department developed the M5 gun shield, which replaced the M2A3. The new design was designated as the M3A1 Gun Motor Carriage (M3A1 GMC).

== Service history ==
=== American use ===
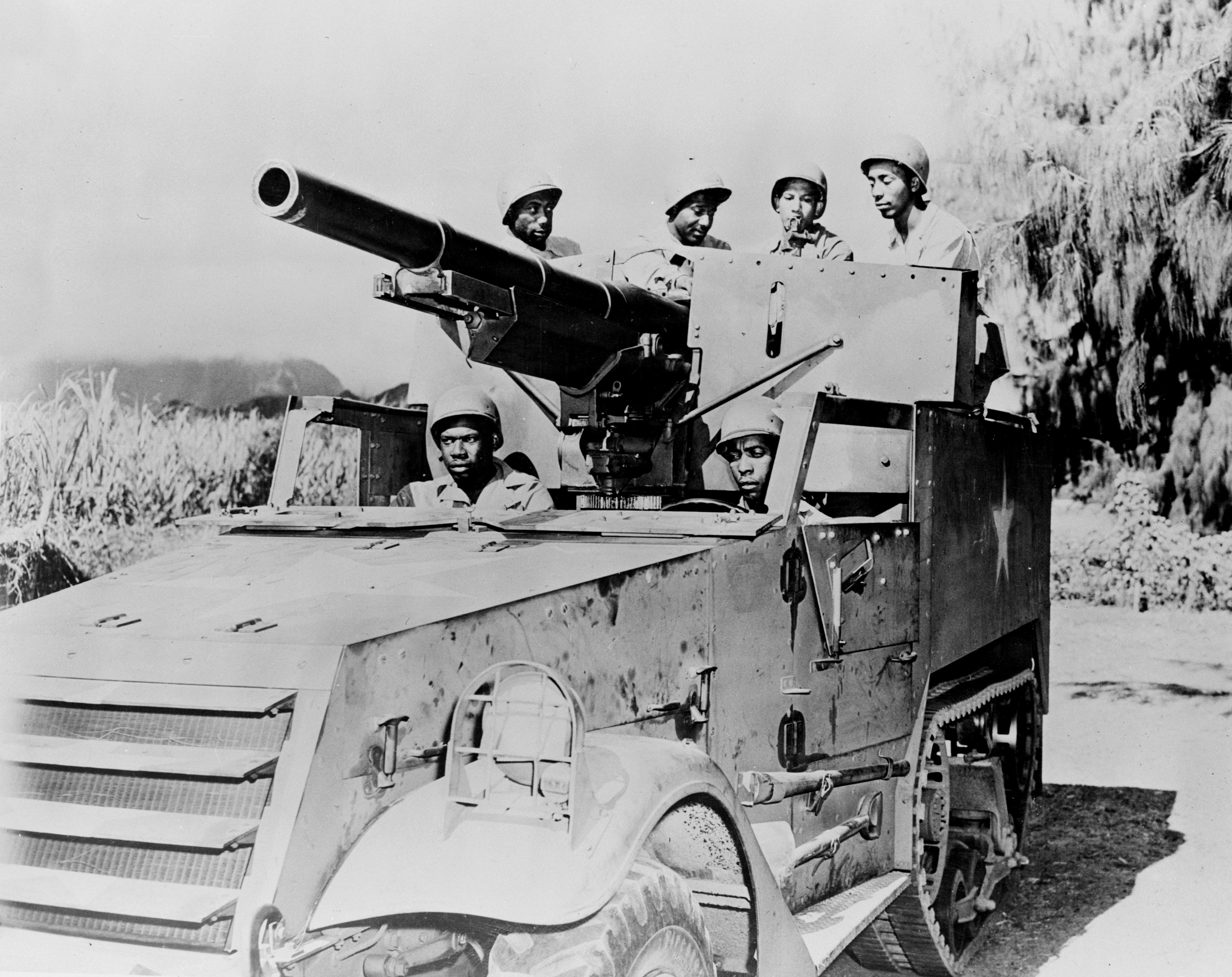
An M3 GMC manned by African-American soldiers.

The T12/M3 GMC first saw action with the U.S. Army in the Philippines in 1941–42, six months after it was designed. Fifty were shipped on convoys to the Philippines in the late summer and fall of 1941. Three battalions of the Provisional Field Artillery Brigade operated T12s against the Japanese when they invaded the Philippines. During the early part of the campaign, the vehicle was used to provide direct covering fire and anti-tank support. The Japanese captured a few vehicles in 1942 and used them in the defense of the Philippines.

By 1942, M3 GMCs were being used by tank destroyer battalions in the North African Campaign, each of which consisted of 36 M3 GMCs and four 37 mm M6 GMCs. The M3 GMCs, which were designed for ambushing tanks, proved to be inadequate for this task in the battles of Sidi Bou Zid and Kasserine Pass, mainly due to poor tactics. Nevertheless, the M3 - and the newly-introduced 3-inch M10 - were later used in the Battle of El Guettar with success, claiming 30 German tanks, including possibly two Tiger tanks, at the cost of 21 M3s and seven M10s. Some M3s also saw service in Allied invasion of Sicily (Operation Husky), but by that time, the M10 tank destroyer had replaced it in the U.S. Army. A total of 1,360 M3 GMCs were also converted back into M3A1 half-tracks.

The M3 also served with the U.S. Marines in the Pacific theater of Operations and was first used in the invasion of Saipan. It proved highly effective against the Japanese Type 95 Ha-Go light tank and the Type 97 Chi-Ha medium tank, in the fight against the Japanese 9th Tank Regiment on Saipan. It also served in the Battle of Peleliu and the Battle of Okinawa, and many other conflicts in the Pacific.

=== Allied use ===
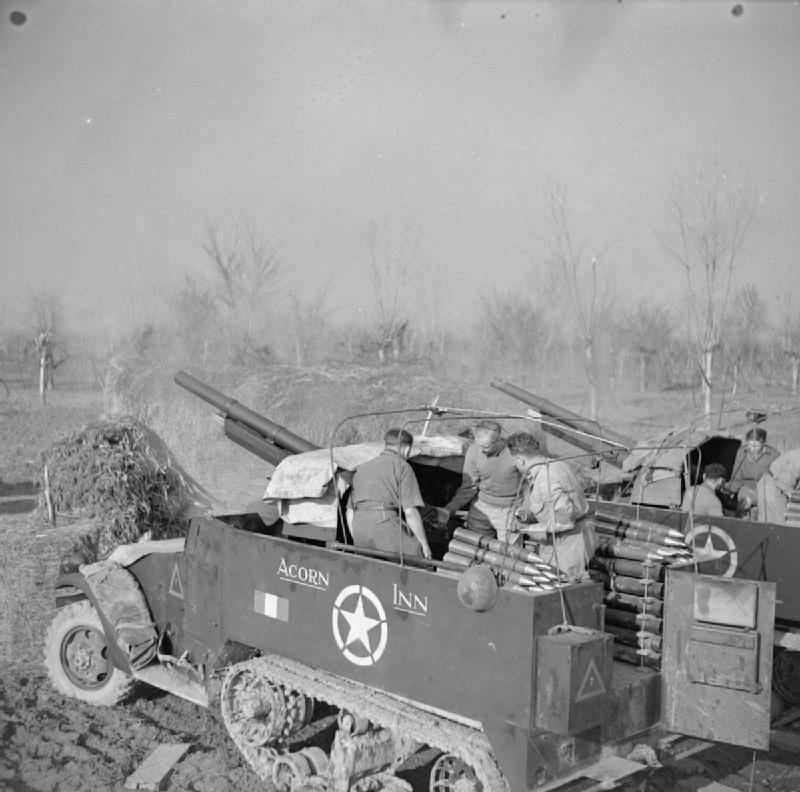
Two British M3 GMCs used for indirect fire in Italy, 18 February 1945.

The M3 GMC saw limited service with other countries as it was not widely supplied through the Lend-Lease program. A small batch of 170 vehicles was supplied to Britain, which used them in their Armoured Car Regiments which were the reconnaissance units of the armored formations. They were first used in the Tunisian Campaign with the Royal Dragoons. They were also used in Sicily, Italy, and later in France, but were gradually retired. The Free French Army also used M3s for training before receiving M10 tank destroyers. With two issued per squadron in practice they were used as an eight gun regimental artillery battery.

== Production ==
A total of 2,202 M3 GMCs were produced from 1941 to 1943. Only 86 vehicles were produced in 1941, but production increased to 1,350 in 1942, with the remaining 766 completed in 1943. Production was stopped due to the introduction of turreted, purpose-built, tank destroyers, such as the M10 GMC.

Production of the M3 GMC (1941)
Month	Aug	Sept	Oct	Nov	Dec	Total
M5	61	25				86

Production of the M3 GMC (1942)
Month	Jan	Feb	March	April	May	June	July	Aug	Sept	Oct	Nov	Dec	Total
M5		1	150	229	274	178	49	112	139	119	90	9	1,350

Production of the M3 GMC (1943)
Month	Jan	Feb	March	Total
M3	291	150	75	766

== See also ==
- List of U.S. military vehicles by model number
- T48 gun motor carriage
