= French submarine Antiope =

French Navy submarine commissioned in 1933

Antiope
History

France
- Name: Antiope
- Namesake: Antiope, an Amazon in Greek mythology
- Operator: French Navy
- Builder: Chantiers Worms le Trait, Rouen, France
- Laid down: 28 December 1928
- Launched: 18 August 1930
- Commissioned: 12 October 1933
- Stricken: 26 April 1946
- Fate: Condemned 26 April 1946

General characteristics
- Class & type: Diane-class submarine
- Displacement: 571 long tons (580 t) (surfaced); 809 long tons (822 t) (submerged)
- Length: 64.4 m (211 ft 3 in)
- Beam: 6.2 m (20 ft 4 in)
- Draft: 4.3 m (14 ft 1 in)
- Propulsion: 2 x 650 hp (485 kW) Normand-Vickers diesel engines; 2 x 500 hp (373 kW) electric motors
- Speed: 13.7 or 14 kn (25.4 or 25.9 km/h; 15.8 or 16.1 mph) (surfaced) (sources disagree); 9 or 9.2 kn (16.7 or 17.0 km/h; 10.4 or 10.6 mph) (submerged) (sources disagree)
- Range: 4,000 nmi (7,400 km; 4,600 mi) at 10 knots (19 km/h; 12 mph) (surface); 82 or 85 nmi (152 or 157 km; 94 or 98 mi) at 5 knots (9.3 km/h; 5.8 mph) (submerged) (sources disagree)
- Test depth: 80 metres (262 ft)
- Complement: 3 officers, 38 men
- Armament: 3 × 550 mm (21.7 in) bow torpedo tubes; 3 × 550 mm (21.7 in) torpedo tubes in forward external rotating turret; 1 × 550 mm (21.7 in) and 2 x 400 mm (15.7 in) torpedo tubes in after external rotating turret; 1 × 76.2 mm (3 in) deck gun; 1 × 13.2 mm (0.5 in) machine gun; 2 × 8 mm (0.31 in) machine guns

Antiope (Q160) was a French Navy Diane-class submarine commissioned in 1933. During World War II, she operated on the Allied side until 1940, when she became part of the naval forces of Vichy France. She returned to the Allied side late in 1942 when she joined the Free French Naval Forces.

== Construction and commissioning ==
Antiope was authorized in the 1927 naval program and her keel was laid down at Chantiers Worms le Trait in Rouen, France, on 28 December 1928. She was launched on 18 August 1930 and commissioned at Cherbourg, France, on 12 October 1933.

== Service history ==
=== French Navy ===
When World War II began on 1 September 1939 with the German invasion of Poland, Antiope was part of the 16th Submarine Division — along with her sister ships Amazone, Orphée, and Sibylle — under the command of Maritime prefecture I and based at the Submarine Center at Cherbourg. France entered the war on the side of the Allies on 3 September 1939.

In 1940 the Allies made plans to intervene in Norway to prevent the shipment of iron ore from Sweden to Germany via Narvik on the Norwegian coast. Twelve French submarines were to participate in the operation, including the four submarines of the 16th Division, under the overall command of Royal Navy Vice Admiral Max Horton. Accordingly, all four submarines of the 16th Submarine Division got underway in company with the French Navy submarine tender Jules Verne and proceeded to Harwich, England, where they arrived on 22 March 1940. At Harwich, they formed the 10th Flotilla under Horton's command. The four submarines patrolled in the North Sea off the coast of the Netherlands until 7 April 1940 without success.

On 8 April 1940 German U-boats began operations in accordance with Operationsbefehl Hartmut ("Operation Order Hartmut") in support of Operation Weserübung, the German invasion of Norway and Denmark. Allied operations related to Norway became of greater urgency when the German invasion of both countries began on 9 April 1940. The French submarines found limited facilities available to them at Harwich and had to rely largely on Jules Verne and spare parts sent from Cherbourg in France for repairs, some of which never were completed. Jules Verne′s crew converted two of Antiope′s water tanks into diesel fuel tanks in an attempt to increase her operating range and to avoid problems with possible leaks from her external fuel tanks, but this modification proved to be of little help in Antiope′s operations.

By 6 May 1940 the Allies had indications that a German invasion of the Netherlands was imminent, and that day Horton ordered all available submarines to put to sea. Four French submarines, including Antiope, received orders to join four British and two Polish submarines in forming a patrol line in the North Sea off the coast of the Netherlands to find and attack German submarines believed to be operating in the area. The Battle of France began when German ground forces advanced into France, the Netherlands, Belgium, and Luxembourg on 10 May 1940. In a friendly fire incident on 20 May 1940, Antiope mistook Sybille for a U-boat and fired three torpedoes at her in the North Sea at 53°23′N 003°44′E at a range of 600 metres (660 yd); the torpedoes passed beneath Sybille.

On 25 May 1940, Jules Verne and the submarines of the 2nd, 13th, and 16th Submarine Divisions arrived in Dundee, Scotland. On 4 June 1940 Jules Verne and all the French submarines assigned to her departed Dundee and proceeded to Brest, France. Italy declared war on France on 10 June 1940 and joined the invasion. As German ground forces approached Brest on 18 June 1940, all French ships received orders at 18:00 to evacuate the port, with those unable to get underway ordered to scuttle themselves. At 18:30, Jules Verne and 13 submarines, including Antiope, got underway from Brest bound for Casablanca, French Morocco, which they reached on 23 June 1940.

The Battle of France ended in France's defeat and armistices with Germany on 22 June 1940 and with Italy on 24 June. When the armistices both went into effect on 25 June 1940, Antiope was at Casablanca.

=== Vichy France ===
After France's surrender, Antiope served in the naval forces of Vichy France. The attack on Mers-el-Kébir — in which a British Royal Navy squadron attacked a French Navy squadron moored at the naval base at Mers El Kébir on the coast of Algeria near Oran – took place on 3 July 1940, leading to French fears that the British also would attack the incomplete French battleship Jean Bart at Casablanca, and that day French submarines there established a standing defensive patrol line along a 20-nautical-mile (37 km; 23 mi) radius from Casablanca. On 13 July 1940, Antiope and her sister ships Calypso and Méduse got underway from Casablanca to relieve the submarines Casabianca, Poncelet, and Sfax on the patrol line.

On 11 and 12 September 1940, Antiope, Amazone, Sibylle, and their sister ship Amphitrite covered Force Y, a French Navy force consisting of three cruisers and three destroyers, as it arrived at Casablanca from Toulon, France, refueled, and then resumed its voyage to French West Africa.

On 23 September 1940 British and Free French forces began Operation Menace, an attack on Vichy French forces at Dakar in Senegal. On 24 September 1940, Antiope, Amazone, Amphitrite, and Sibylle received orders to deploy to French West Africa. Each of the submarines departed Casablanca as she became ready for the deployment. Operation Menace ended on 25 September 1940 in the withdrawal of the British and Free French forces from Dakar. Antiope arrived at Dakar on 3 October 1940 to reinforce its defenses.

As of 23 October 1940 Antiope still was part of the 13th Submarine Division along with Amazone, Orphée, and Sibylle, but now based in French Morocco. She was in port at Casablanca from 9 to 27 January 1941. She underwent a refit there, after which she conducted post-refit trials at the end of February 1941 and returned to active service with the 13th Submarine Division. On 22 April 1941 she departed Casablanca bound for Toulon, where she was placed under guard in an unarmed and unfueled status in accordance with the June 1940 armistice.

Subsequently, reactivated, Antiope conducted operations from Casablanca and French West Africa during 1942. On 10 September 1942 she departed Dakar escorting Convoy D-56. From 14 to 18 September 1942 she called at Port-Étienne in Mauritania, where her crew was granted shore leave. During her stay in Port-Etienne, the local authorities offered her commanding officer a dromedary camel, and he decided to bring the animal aboard Antiope for the two-day voyage to Dakar. After Antiope′s crew overcame a number of difficulties to bring the camel aboard, Antiope received urgent orders to join the auxiliary cruiser Quercy in escorting the French merchant ship Gabon, which was carrying an important cargo, and her crew had to rush to put the camel back ashore at Port-Etienne – much to her commanding officer's apparent disappointment – before getting back underway on 18 September 1942.

As of 1 November 1942 Antiope still was part of the 16th Submarine Division along with Amazone, Amphitrite, Sibylle, and the submarine Perle and based at Casablanca. During the night of 7–8 November 1942, the French naval commander at Casablanca received indications that an Allied invasion of French North Africa was imminent and took action to resist it. Operation Torch, the Allied amphibious landings in French Morocco and Algeria, began in the predawn hours of 8 November. That morning at 06:30, Antiope departed Casablanca bound for a patrol area in the Atlantic Ocean off French Morocco bearing between 165 degrees and 200 degrees from El Hank. At 09:54, with the Naval Battle of Casablanca raging between United States Navy and Vichy French forces, she fired six torpedoes at the U.S. heavy cruiser USS Tuscaloosa (CA-37), narrowly missing her. After avoiding a torpedo fired by a U.S. submarine and bombs dropped on her by three U.S. Navy F4F Wildcat fighters, Antiope escaped. Facing no further counterattacks by U.S. forces, she returned to Casablanca, where she anchored in the harbor, then docked to refuel.

On 9 November 1942 Antiope and Amazone got underway from Casablanca bound for Port-Etienne. While they were at sea, fighting between Allied and Vichy French forces in French North Africa ended on 11 November 1942. The two submarines arrived at Port-Etienne on 15 November 1942 for an overnight stop, then proceeded on 16 November to Dakar, which they reached without incident on 18 November 1942.

=== Free France ===
After hostilities with the Allies in French North Africa ended, French forces in Africa switched to the Allied side, joining the forces of Free France. Antiope became a unit of the Free French Naval Forces. By 1943 she was operating in the Mediterranean Sea, where she was integrated into a squadron of British submarines operating from Algiers in Algeria. She departed Algiers on 27 April 1943 for a patrol off the Italian Riviera. Finding no targets, she fired a torpedo at the piles of an Italian bridge, but it bounced off the riprap at the base of one of the piles, inflicting no damage. She then returned to Algiers.

After a few weeks of repairs at Oran, Antiope got underway on 16 July 1943 to return to Algiers. She departed Algiers on 24 July 1943 for a patrol area off Corsica. She returned to Algiers on 5 August 1943.

Assigned to training duty in the United States at the U.S. Navy sound school at Key West, Florida, Antiope got underway from Gibraltar on 28 March 1944 for the westward voyage across the Atlantic Ocean in company with the Polish Navy submarine ORP Dzik and the fleet tender FT-16, escorted by the British naval trawler HMT Haarlem. She served at Key West until 28 December 1944, when she departed for a voyage to the Philadelphia Navy Yard on League Island in Philadelphia, Pennsylvania. She reached Philadelphia on 2 January 1945 and underwent a refit at the navy yard. Upon its completion, she got underway on 21 March 1945 bound for Key West, which she reached on 26 March 1945. She resumed her duties with the sound school there.

World War II ended in Europe on 8 May 1945, and Antiope subsequently concluded her stint at Key West. She departed on 12 July 1945 and proceeded to Bermuda. After a stop there, she got back underway on 23 July 1945, called at Ponta Delgada in the Azores, and then headed for Oran.

Antiope was stricken from the navy list and condemned on 26 April 1946.
