= French submarine La Psyché =

French Diane-class submarine commissioned 1933

History

France
- Name: La Psyché
- Namesake: Psyche, the goddess of the soul in Greek mythology
- Operator: French Navy
- Builder: Chantiers et Ateliers Augustin Normand, Le Havre, France
- Laid down: 26 December 1930
- Launched: 4 August 1932
- Commissioned: 23 December 1933
- Fate: Sunk 8 November 1942; Refloated 1944; Scrapped

General characteristics
- Class & type: Diane-class submarine
- Displacement: 571 long tons (580 t) (surfaced); 809 long tons (822 t) (submerged)
- Length: 64.4 m (211 ft 3 in)
- Beam: 6.2 m (20 ft 4 in)
- Draft: 4.3 m (14 ft 1 in)
- Propulsion: 2 x 650 hp (485 kW) Normand-Vickers diesel engines; 2 x 500 hp (373 kW) electric motors
- Speed: 13.7 or 14 kn (25.4 or 25.9 km/h; 15.8 or 16.1 mph) (surfaced) (sources disagree); 9 or 9.2 kn (16.7 or 17.0 km/h; 10.4 or 10.6 mph) (submerged) (sources disagree)
- Range: 4,000 nmi (7,400 km; 4,600 mi) at 10 knots (19 km/h; 12 mph) (surface); 82 or 85 nmi (152 or 157 km; 94 or 98 mi) at 5 knots (9.3 km/h; 5.8 mph) (submerged) (sources disagree)
- Test depth: 80 metres (262 ft)
- Complement: 3 officers, 38 men
- Armament: 3 × 550 mm (21.7 in) bow torpedo tubes; 3 × 550 mm (21.7 in) torpedo tubes in forward external rotating turret; 1 × 550 mm (21.7 in) and 2 x 400 mm (15.7 in) torpedo tubes in after external rotating turret; 1 × 76.2 mm (3 in) deck gun; 1 × 13.2 mm (0.5 in) machine gun; 2 × 8 mm (0.31 in) machine guns

La Psyché (Q174) was a French Navy Diane-class submarine commissioned in 1933. During World War II, she operated on the Allied side until 1940, when she became part of the naval forces of Vichy France. She was sunk in November 1942.

French sources sometimes refer to the submarine simply as Psyché, either instead of or interchangeably with La Psyché.

== Construction and commissioning ==
La Psyché was authorized in the 1929 naval program and her keel was laid down at Chantiers et Ateliers Augustin Normand in Le Havre, France, on 26 December 1930. She was launched on 4 August 1932 with over 2,000 people in attendance, and she was commissioned at Cherbourg, France, on 23 December 1933.

== Service history ==
=== French Navy ===
==== Pre-World War II ====
La Psyché was at sea for exercises on 21 September 1933, and she put to sea for exercises again on 28 September 1933. She got underway for exercises with the submarine Le Glorieux on 10 October 1933 and again on 15 November 1933 with the submarines L'Espoir and Oréade and the minelayer Pollux.

On 23 February 1934, La Psyché and the submarine Diane were recorded as en route to Dunkirk, France. La Psyché arrived in Le Havre from Cherbourg on 28 April 1934 to undergo major modifications. In November 1934 La Psyché, her sister ships Amazone and Méduse, and the submarine Danaé visited Leith, Scotland.

==== World War II ====
When World War II began on 1 September 1939 with the German invasion of Poland, La Psyché was part of the 18th Submarine Division — a part of the 2nd Submarine Squadron in the 6th Squadron — along with her sister ships Amphitrite, Méduse, and Oréade, based at Oran in Algeria. France entered the war on the side of the Allies on 3 September 1939.

German ground forces advanced into France, the Netherlands, Belgium, and Luxembourg on 10 May 1940, beginning the Battle of France, and Italy declared war on France on 10 June 1940 and joined the invasion. The battle ended in France's defeat and armistices with Germany on 22 June 1940 and with Italy on 24 June. When the armistices both went into effect on 25 June 1940, La Psyché was at Oran.

=== Vichy France ===
After France's surrender, La Psyché served in the naval forces of Vichy France. Following a refit at Bizerte in Tunisia, she got underway to escort the French Navy submarine tender Jules Verne to Dakar in Senegal, where the two vessels arrived on 23 March 1941.

La Psyché and Oréade visited Safi, French Morocco, from 7 to 19 January 1942 and Port Lyautey, French Morocco, from 13 to 17 February 1942. On 1 November 1942, the two submarines were part of the 18th Submarine Division and were recorded as being at sea off Oran, bound for Casablanca in French Morocco.

=== Loss ===
La Psyché was in port at Casablanca on 8 November 1942 when Allied forces invaded French North Africa in Operation Torch. As the Naval Battle of Casablanca began that morning, the United States Navy aircraft carrier USS Ranger (CV-4) and escort aircraft carrier USS Suwannee (CVE-27) began launching airstrikes targeting Casablanca, the first of which attacked at 07:10. U.S. Navy SBD Dauntless dive bombers attacked La Psyché at 08:15, sinking her in the harbor at 33°06′30″N 007°36′58″W. Her commanding officer, two other officers, and eight crewmen were killed, and many members of her crew were wounded.

Hostilities between Allied and French forces in French North Africa ceased on 11 November 1942, and French forces in Africa subsequently joined the Allies as part of the forces of Free France. La Psyché was refloated in 1944 but never repaired. She subsequently was scrapped.
