= French submarine Orphée =

French Navy Diane-class submarine commissioned 1933

Orphée
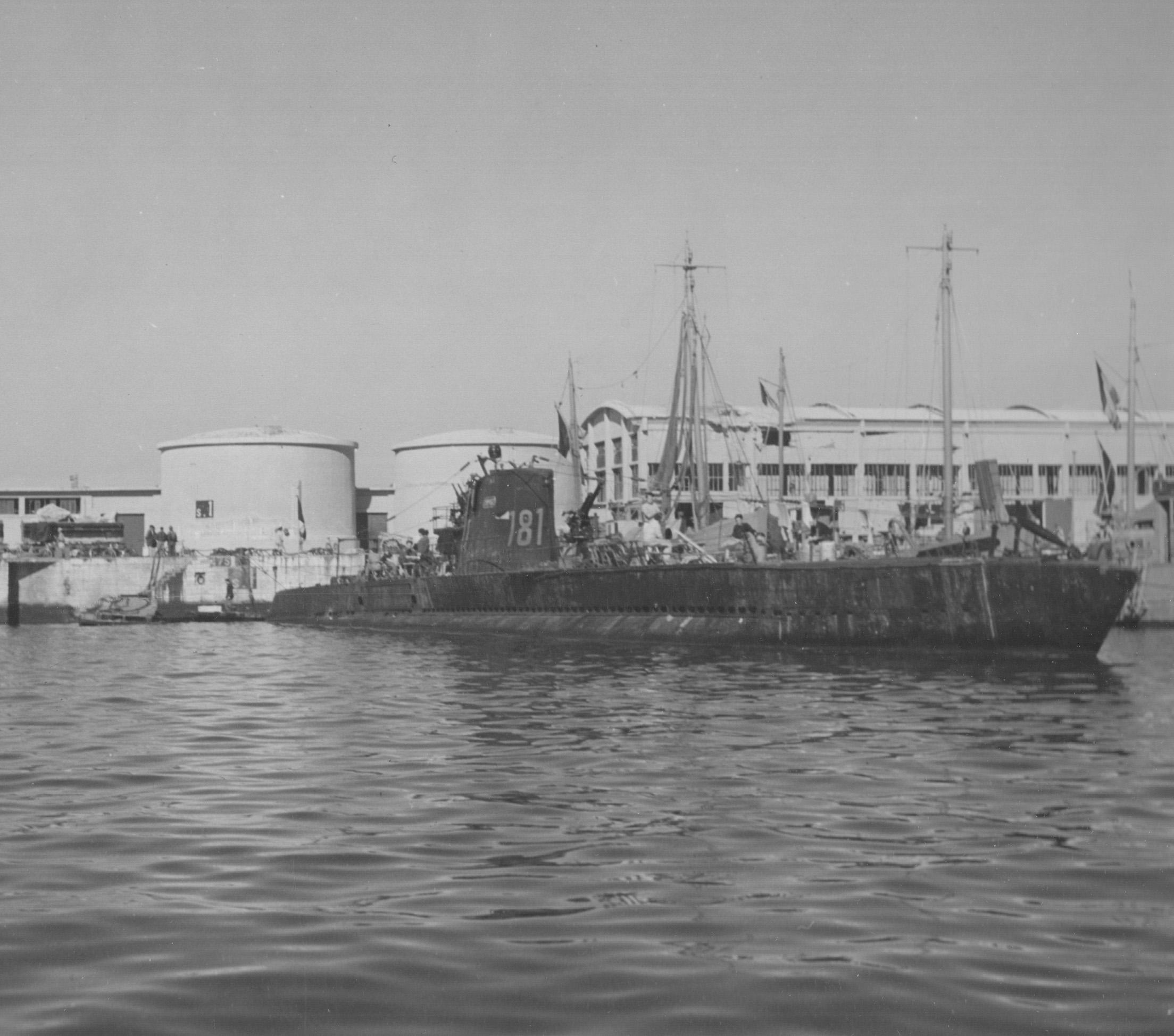
- Orphée in December 1942.

History

France
- Name: Orphée
- Namesake: Orpheus, a Thracian bard, musician, poet and prophet in ancient Greek religion
- Operator: French Navy
- Ordered: 1928
- Builder: Augustin Normand, Le Havre, France
- Laid down: 22 August 1929
- Launched: 10 November 1931
- Commissioned: 8 June 1933
- Fate: Condemned 26 March 1946; Disarmed April 1946

General characteristics
- Class & type: Diane-class submarine
- Displacement: 571 long tons (580 t) (surfaced); 809 long tons (822 t) (submerged)
- Length: 64.4 m (211 ft 3 in)
- Beam: 6.2 m (20 ft 4 in)
- Draft: 4.3 m (14 ft 1 in)
- Propulsion: 2 x 650 hp (485 kW) Normand-Vickers diesel engines; 2 x 500 hp (373 kW) electric motors
- Speed: 13.7 or 14 kn (25.4 or 25.9 km/h; 15.8 or 16.1 mph) (surfaced) (sources disagree); 9 or 9.2 kn (16.7 or 17.0 km/h; 10.4 or 10.6 mph) (submerged) (sources disagree)
- Range: 4,000 nmi (7,400 km; 4,600 mi) at 10 knots (19 km/h; 12 mph) (surface); 82 or 85 nmi (152 or 157 km; 94 or 98 mi) at 5 knots (9.3 km/h; 5.8 mph) (submerged) (sources disagree)
- Test depth: 80 metres (262 ft)
- Complement: 3 officers, 38 men
- Armament: 3 × 550 mm (21.7 in) bow torpedo tubes; 3 × 550 mm (21.7 in) torpedo tubes in forward external rotating turret; 1 × 550 mm (21.7 in) and 2 x 400 mm (15.7 in) torpedo tubes in after external rotating turret; 1 × 76.2 mm (3 in) deck gun; 1 × 13.2 mm (0.5 in) machine gun; 2 × 8 mm (0.31 in) machine guns

Orphée (Q163) was a French Navy Diane-class submarine commissioned in 1933. During World War II, she operated on the Allied side until 1940, when she became part of the naval forces of Vichy France. In 1942 she joined the Free French Naval Forces. She was condemned in 1946.

== Construction and commissioning ==
Orphée was ordered in 1928 as part of Naval Program 115. Her construction began on 18 December 1928, and her keel was laid down at the Augustin Normand shipyard in Le Havre, France, on 22 August 1929. She was launched on 10 November 1931. After fitting out, she was commissioned for trials on 1 February 1932. Her official trials began on 16 April 1932, and her final equipping and armament took place at Cherbourg, France, from 31 December 1932 to 15 March 1933. She was placed in full commission on 8 June 1933.

== Service history ==
=== Pre-World War II ===
On 23 May 1933, Orphée lost a crewman.

On 28 November 1934, the submarine Eurydice got underway from Cherbourg to conduct exercises with Orphée and Orphée′s sister ship Oréade.

=== World War II ===
==== French Navy ====
When World War II began on 1 September 1939 with the German invasion of Poland, Orphée was part of the 16th Submarine Division — a part of the 1st Maritime Prefecture at the Submarine Center — at Cherbourg along with her sister ships Amazone, Antiope, and Sibylle. France entered the war on the side of the Allies on 3 September 1939.

In 1940 the Allies made plans to intervene in Norway to prevent the shipment of iron ore from Sweden to Germany via Narvik on the Norwegian coast. Twelve French submarines were to participate in the operation, including the four submarines of the 16th Division, under the overall command of Royal Navy Vice Admiral Max Horton. Accordingly, all four submarines of the 16th Submarine Division got underway in company with the French Navy submarine tender Jules Verne and proceeded to Harwich, England, where they arrived on 22 March 1940. At Harwich, they formed the 10th Flotilla under Horton's command. The four submarines patrolled in the North Sea off the coast of the Netherlands until 7 April 1940 without success.

On 8 April 1940 German U-boats began operations in accordance with Operationsbefehl Hartmut ("Operation Order Hartmut") in support of Operation Weserübung, the German invasion of Norway and Denmark. Allied operations related to Norway became of greater urgency when the German invasion of both countries began on 9 April 1940. The French submarines found limited facilities available to them at Harwich and had to rely largely on Jules Verne and spare parts sent from Cherbourg in France for repairs, some of which never were completed. On 21 April 1940, Orphée fired two torpedoes at the German submarine U-51 in the North Sea at 57°N 005°E, but both missed.

German ground forces advanced into France, the Netherlands, Belgium, and Luxembourg on 10 May 1940, beginning the Battle of France. On 25 May 1940, Jules Verne and the submarines of the 2nd, 13th, and 16th Submarine Divisions arrived in Dundee, Scotland. On 4 June 1940 Jules Verne and all the French submarines assigned to her departed Dundee and proceeded to Brest, France.

Italy declared war on France on 10 June 1940 and joined the invasion. As German ground forces approached Brest on 18 June 1940, all French ships received orders at 18:00 to evacuate the port, with those unable to get underway ordered to scuttle themselves. At 18:30, Jules Verne and 13 submarines, including Orphée, got underway from Brest bound for Casablanca, French Morocco, which they reached on 23 June 1940.

The Battle of France ended in France's defeat and armistices with Germany on 22 June 1940 and with Italy on 24 June. When both armistices went into effect on 25 June 1940, Orphée was at Casablanca.

==== Vichy France ====
After France′s surrender, Orphée served in the naval forces of Vichy France. On 3 July 1940, the British began Operation Catapult, which sought to seize or neutralize the ships of the French Navy to prevent their use by the Axis powers. The Royal Navy′s Force H arrived off the French naval base at Mers El Kébir near Oran in Algeria that day and demanded that the French Navy either turn over the ships based there to British custody or disable them. When the French refused, the British warships opened fire on the French ships in the harbor in the attack on Mers-el-Kébir. French forces at Casablanca were placed on alert that day, and the submarines Ajax, Amazone, Amphitrite, Méduse, and Persée put to sea to patrol off Casablanca. On 5 July, Orphée got underway to relieve Ajax and Persée on patrol. The alert status ended on 18 July 1940 in the interest of reducing the wear on French submarines and demands on their crews. Tensions again increased at Casablanca on 21 July 1940 when the French Air Force flew a reconnaissance mission over Gibraltar, but relaxed a few hours later.

Orphée became flagship of the 13th Submarine Division — which also included Amazone, Antiope, and Sibylle — in September 1940, and continued to operate from Casablanca during 1940, 1941, and 1942. In March 1942 she was reassigned to the new 18th Submarine Division at Casablanca.

On 8 November 1942, Allied forces invaded French North Africa in Operation Torch. Orphée sortied at 05:33 to patrol off Casablanca with Amazone, Antiope, Méduse, and Sibylle, assigned a patrol area bearing between 85 and 120 degrees from El Hank on the coast of French Morocco. As the Naval Battle of Casablanca raged between United States Navy and Vichy French forces, she sighted several Allied ships on 8 and 9 November 1942, but was unable to attack any of them. French naval authorities recalled her to Casablanca on 9 November 1942. She arrived there at 01:30 on 10 November 1942, moored next to the destroyer Le Malin, and took on supplies. She got back underway at 03:00 bound for Dakar in Senegal, but during the day on 10 November French resistance to the Allied invasion ended, and she again was recalled. She arrived at Casablanca at midnight.

==== Free French Naval Forces ====
After the end of hostilities between French and Allied forces in French North Africa, Orphée joined the Free French Naval Forces. In mid-December 1942, she and the submarine Atalante began service as training ships.

Orphée later returned to combat duties. On 8 August 1943, she made an unsuccessful attempt to land an agent at San Stefano near Anzio on the coast of Italy. Operating from the submarine base at Oran in November 1943, she landed five agents on the coast of Spain at Barcelona on 20 November. On 7 December 1943, she fired three torpedoes at the 348-ton Vichy French tug Faron and sank her near Toulon, France, at 43°02′N 006°01′E. It was the first time during World War II that a French submarine sank a ship in the Mediterranean Sea. She visited Barcelona again on 28 December 1943, landing four agents and picking up one, and her submarine division awarded her a citation of the order (French: citation à l'ordre) on 31 December 1943.

On 25 January 1944, Orphée landed six agents at Barcelona and picked up three. On 22 February 1944, she returned to Barcelona, where she landed seven more agents and picked up two. On 1 March 1944, she landed four agents at Barcelona. At 13:53 on 2 March 1944, she fired a torpedo at the Spanish steam cargo ship SS Virgen de Montserrat near Barcelona.

In September 1944, the Free French Naval Forces made plans to place Orphée in special reserve. In August 1945, when World War II came to an end with the cessation of hostilities between the Allies and Japan, she still was part of the Oran Submarine Group.

=== Post-World War II ===
On 16 October 1945, Orphée collided with the Spanish fishing trawler José Carmen. At 11:20 on 3 March 1946 she suffered an explosion while docked at Casablanca that killed two men and injured nine. The explosion was attributed to poor ventilation of her batteries. In April 1946, a request was made for recognition of members of Orphée′s crew who particularly distinguished themselves in responding to the accident.

== Final disposition ==
Orphée was condemned on 26 March 1946 and disarmed in April 1946.

== Honors and awards ==
- Croix de Guerre 1939–1945, awarded 23 August 1946
