= French ship Danaé =

Several frigates and one submarine of the French Navy have borne the name Danaé:

- French frigate Danaé (1756), 38-gun frigate, captured by the Royal Navy in 1759, named HMS Danae (1759)
- Danae, a 32-gun frigate built in 1763, captured by the British in 1779, and then placed in Royal Navy service as HMS Danae (1779)
- French frigate Danaé (1782)
- French frigate Danaé (1807), a Consolante-class frigate
- French submarine Danaé, an Ariane-class submarine launched in 1927 and scuttled in 1942
