= French submarine Ondine (Q121) =

French Navy Ondine-class submarine commissioned 1928

Ondine
- Photograph of Ondine published in the newspaper The Daily Colonist on 28 October 1928.

History

France
- Name: Ondine
- Namesake: Undine, a category of elemental beings associated with water
- Operator: French Navy
- Ordered: 30 June 1922
- Builder: Chantiers et Ateliers Augustin Normand, Le Havre, France
- Laid down: 8 February 1923
- Launched: 8 May or 5 August 1925 (see text)
- Commissioned: 17 August 1928
- Fate: Sunk in collision 3 October 1928

General characteristics
- Class & type: Ariane-class submarine
- Displacement: 626 long tons (636 t) (surfaced); 787 long tons (800 t) (submerged)
- Length: 64 or 65.98 m (210 ft 0 in or 216 ft 6 in) (sources disagree)
- Beam: 4.92 or 6.2 m (16 ft 2 in or 20 ft 4 in) (sources disagree)
- Draft: 3.82 or 4.1 m (12 ft 6 in or 13 ft 5 in) (sources disagree)
- Propulsion: 2 x 600 hp (447 kW) Vickers diesel engines; 2 x 500 hp (373 kW) electric motors
- Speed: 14 kn (26 km/h; 16 mph) (surfaced); 7.5 kn (13.9 km/h; 8.6 mph) (submerged)
- Range: 3,500 nmi (6,500 km; 4,000 mi) at 7.5 knots (13.9 km/h; 8.6 mph) (surface); 75 nmi (139 km; 86 mi) at 5 knots (9.3 km/h; 5.8 mph) (submerged)
- Test depth: 80 m (262 ft)
- Complement: 3 officers, 38 men
- Armament: 7 x 21.7 in (550 mm) torpedo tubes (6 bow/1 stern) or (3 internal bow/2 rotating external bow/2 stern) (sources disagree); 1 x 75 mm (2.95 in) deck gun; 1 or 2 x 13.2 mm (0.52 in) machine guns (sources disagree)

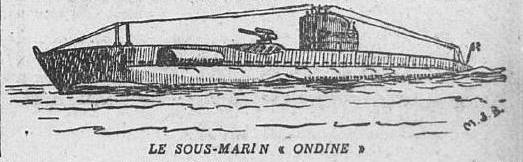
Drawing of Ondine published in the newspaper L'Ouest-Éclair on 13 October 1928.

Ondine (Q121) was a French Navy Ariane-class submarine commissioned in August 1928. She was sunk in a collision in October 1928.

== Construction and commissioning ==
Ordered on 30 June 1922, Ondine was laid down along with her sister ship Ariane at Chantiers et Ateliers Augustin Normand in Le Havre, France, on 8 February 1923 with the hull number Q121. She was launched on either 8 May or 5 August 1925, according to different sources, and commissioned on 17 August 1928.

== Service history ==
With a crew of three officers and 40 enlisted men aboard, Ondine departed Cherbourg, France, on 1 October 1928 for a lengthy cruise to Bizerte and Tunis in Tunisia, Ajaccio on Corsica, and Toulon, France. On 3 October 1928, she reported that she was 25 nautical miles (46 km; 29 mi) northwest of Ferrol, Spain. She was never heard from again.

=== Loss ===
By 6 October 1928, French Navy authorities at Cherbourg had become concerned about the safety of Ondine and her crew. The day of her scheduled arrival at Bizerte, 8 October 1928, passed with no sign of Ondine. On 9 October 1928 the French destroyers Chacal, Panthère, and Tigre got underway from Toulon to begin a search for her, and later a second squadron of destroyers from the French Atlantic Fleet proceeded to the waters off Porto, Portugal, and joined the search. By 11 October 1928, the French Navy had determined that Ondine had not reached any port in Spain, Portugal, or the Canary Islands. By 12 October 1928, the French Navy had 14 warships and two squadrons of seaplanes searching for any sign of Ondine or her crew along her entire planned route from Cherbourg to Bizerte. The French Ministry of the Navy continued to express confidence that Ondine would be found, taking the optimistic view that she merely had suffered a machinery breakdown of some kind that had crippled her propulsion and communications.

On 12 October 1928, the Greek cargo ship SS Ekaterina Goulandris (or Aikaterina M. Goulandris) entered drydock at Rotterdam in the Netherlands for repairs to her bow, and that day her captain reported that she had collided with a low-lying vessel, apparently a submarine, in the Atlantic Ocean off either Vigo, Spain, or Porto (according to different sources) at 23:00 on 3 October 1928. According to the Greek captain, the submarine was running on the surface on a clear, calm night when Ekaterina Goulandris struck its stern. Ekaterina Goulandris immediately sent a Wireless message requesting assistance from any other vessels in the vicinity and began a search for the submarine or its survivors, but the submarine had disappeared without a trace.

The French Ministry of the Navy received word of the Greek captain's report on the evening of 12 October 1928. The ministry immediately concluded that Ekaterina Goulandris had collided with Ondine, which had sunk with the loss of her entire crew of 43 in 6,000 feet (1,829 m) of water at 42°00′N 009°06′W. The ministry's official announcement of the collision on 12 October 1928 stated that Ekaterina Goulandris′s captain had suspended his search for survivors after only two hours, and French officials expressed astonishment and consternation both that he had taken nine days to report the collision and that he had given up the search for survivors so quickly. Press accounts from Rotterdam had by 14 October 1928 called into question the announcement that the Greek captain's search had lasted only two hours, reporting that Ekaterina Goulandris had searched in the vicinity of the collision for survivors for 13 hours before proceeding with her voyage.

=== Aftermath ===
On the evening of 12 October 1928, the French Navy recalled the aircraft and larger ships searching for Ondine, although as late as 18 October 1928 the press reported that French torpedo boats continued to look for signs of the submarine and her crew. The French Navy also issued orders on the evening of 12 October to the training ship Edgar Quinet to get underway from Brest, France, on the morning of 13 October 1928, proceed to the scene of the collision, and render final honors to the crew of Ondine. Newspapers reported emotional scenes at Cherbourg and Rouen, France, where family members of the crew gathered for word of Ondine′s fate, and that Ondine′s commanding officer had had a premonition of disaster, writing to his parents before Ondine′s departure, "I embrace you for the last time. Something tells me I shall not return."

In the days following the Greek captain's report of the collision, French newspapers began to speculate about the loss of Ondine, blaming the Greek captain but also questioning the decision-making of the French Navy. Ondine′s commanding officer was highly regarded in the French submarine force, and newspapers asked why on a clear, calm night Ondine′s crew did not see the approaching Ekaterina Goulandris in time to take evasive action and whether Ondine was using her running lights while operating on the surface in darkness. Newspaper reporting indicated that naval observers expressed surprise that none of Ondine′s crew survived, as some should have been on deck at the time of the collision or otherwise managed to abandon ship as she sank. The press also questioned the decision to send Ondine on her cruise unescorted, because an escorting surface ship could have reduced the chances of a collision and responded quickly to any breakdown or emergency. The newspaper Le Matin expressed doubts about Ondine′s material readiness for such a lengthy voyage because she had undergone a number of alterations to correct defects during her construction, fitting out, and sea trials, and because at the time of her loss her sister ships Ariane and Danaé were scheduled to be taken out of service and returned to the shipyard for alterations prior to commissioning.
