= French submarine Amphitrite (Q159) =

Amphitrite
History

France
- Name: Amphitrite
- Namesake: Amphitrite, the goddess and queen of the sea and wife of Poseidon in Greek mythology
- Operator: French Navy
- Builder: Chantiers et Ateliers Augustin Normand, Le Havre, France
- Laid down: 8 August 1928
- Launched: 20 December 1930
- Commissioned: 8 June 1933
- Fate: Sunk 8 November 1942; Refloated 12 March 1943; Condemned 26 March 1946
- Stricken: May 1946

General characteristics
- Class & type: Diane-class submarine
- Displacement: 571 long tons (580 t) (surfaced); 809 long tons (822 t) (submerged)
- Length: 64.4 m (211 ft 3 in)
- Beam: 6.2 m (20 ft 4 in)
- Draft: 4.3 m (14 ft 1 in)
- Propulsion: 2 x 650 hp (485 kW) Normand-Vickers diesel engines; 2 x 500 hp (373 kW) electric motors
- Speed: 13.7 or 14 kn (25.4 or 25.9 km/h; 15.8 or 16.1 mph) (surfaced) (sources disagree); 9 or 9.2 kn (16.7 or 17.0 km/h; 10.4 or 10.6 mph) (submerged) (sources disagree)
- Range: 4,000 nmi (7,400 km; 4,600 mi) at 10 knots (19 km/h; 12 mph) (surface); 82 or 85 nmi (152 or 157 km; 94 or 98 mi) at 5 knots (9.3 km/h; 5.8 mph) (submerged) (sources disagree)
- Test depth: 80 metres (262 ft)
- Complement: 3 officers, 38 men
- Armament: 3 × 550 mm (21.7 in) bow torpedo tubes; 3 × 550 mm (21.7 in) torpedo tubes in forward external rotating turret; 1 × 550 mm (21.7 in) and 2 x 400 mm (15.7 in) torpedo tubes in after external rotating turret; 1 × 76.2 mm (3 in) deck gun; 1 × 13.2 mm (0.5 in) machine gun; 2 × 8 mm (0.31 in) machine guns

Amphitrite (Q159) was a French Navy Diane-class submarine commissioned in 1933. During World War II, she operated on the Allied side until 1940, when she became part of the naval forces of Vichy France. She was sunk by U.S. aircraft in November 1942 during Operation Torch.

== Construction and commissioning ==
Amphitrite was authorized in the 1927 naval program and her keel was laid down at Chantiers et Ateliers Augustin Normand in Le Havre, France, on 8 August 1928. She was launched on 20 December 1930 and commissioned at Cherbourg, France, on 8 June 1933.

== Service history ==
=== French Navy ===
When World War II began on 1 September 1939 with the German invasion of Poland, Amphitrite was part of the 18th Submarine Division — a part of the 2nd Submarine Squadron in the 6th Squadron — along with her sister ships Méduse, Oréade, and La Psyché, based at Oran in Algeria. France entered the war on the side of the Allies on 3 September 1939.

German ground forces advanced into France, the Netherlands, Belgium, and Luxembourg on 10 May 1940, beginning the Battle of France, and Italy declared war on France on 10 June 1940 and joined the invasion. By 15 June 1940, Amphitrite was at Brest, France. As German ground forces approached Brest on 18 June 1940, all French ships received orders at 18:00 to evacuate the port, with those unable to get underway ordered to scuttle themselves. At 18:30, the submarine tender Jules Verne and 13 submarines, including Amphitrite, got underway from Brest bound for Casablanca, French Morocco, which they reached on 23 June 1940.

The Battle of France ended in France's defeat and armistices with Germany on 22 June 1940 and with Italy on 24 June. When the armistices both went into effect on 25 June 1940, Amphitrite was at Casablanca, still in the 18th Submarine Division and still home-ported at Oran.

=== Vichy France ===
After France's surrender, Amphitrite served in the naval forces of Vichy France. The attack on Mers-el-Kébir — in which a British Royal Navy squadron attacked a French Navy squadron moored at the naval base at Mers El Kébir on the coast of Algeria near Oran — took place on 3 July 1940, and that day Amphitrite and her sister ships Amazone and Méduse put to sea to establish a defensive patrol line along a 20-nautical-mile (37 km; 23 mi) radius from Casablanca. On 13 July 1940, Amphitrite and Méduse again got underway from Casablanca, this time with the submarine Calypso, to relieve the submarines Casabianca, Poncelet, and Sfax on the patrol line 20 nautical miles (37 km; 23 mi) from Casablanca.

On 11 and 12 September 1940, Amphitrite, Amazone, and their sister ships Antiope and Sibylle covered Force Y, a French Navy force consisting of three cruisers and three destroyers, as it arrived at Casablanca from Toulon, refueled, and then resumed its voyage to French West Africa.

On 23 September 1940, British and Free French forces began Operation Menace, an attack on Vichy French forces at Dakar in Senegal. On 24 September 1940, Amphitrite, Amazone, Antiope, and Sibylle received orders to deploy to French West Africa. Each of the submarines departed Casablanca as she became ready for the deployment. Amphitrite got underway from Casablanca on 25 September 1940, the day Operation Menace ended in the withdrawal of the British and Free French forces from Dakar. She arrived at Dakar on 2 October 1940 to reinforce its defenses. She arrived with a broken muffler, forcing her to operate on only one diesel engine for the next month and a half. By 13 October 1940 she was part of the 13th Submarine Division along with Méduse and the submarine Thétis.

Amphitrite departed Dakar on 2 January 1941 and, after a stop at Casablanca from 15 to 27 January 1941, proceeded to Toulon. She was disarmed and placed under guard in an unfueled status at Toulon on 6 February 1941 in accordance with the June 1940 armistice.

Amphitrite was reactivated in January 1942. She arrived at Dakar with Amazone and Sybille on 23 February 1942. As of 1 November 1942, she was part of the 16th Submarine Division, based at Dakar, with Amazone, Antiope, Sibylle, and the submarine Perle.

=== Loss ===
Amphitrite was in port at Casablanca on 8 November 1942 when Allied forces invaded French North Africa in Operation Torch. She had arrived from Dakar with all of her torpedoes aboard but lacked the fuel to get underway. As the Naval Battle of Casablanca between United States Navy and Vichy French forces began that morning, U.S. Navy SBD Dauntless dive bombers from the aircraft carrier USS Ranger (CV-4) attacked her at 08:00, disabling her by puncturing her port ballast tanks. Her commanding officer suffered a slight shrapnel wound to the chest and one of her gunners was seriously wounded. At 08:15, her crew received the order to abandon ship. By the time the air raid ended at 09:30, Amphitrite had suffered one killed, three missing, and 18 wounded, five seriously.

Amphitrite suffered additional damage as the U.S. Navy battleship USS Massachusetts (BB-59) and her accompanying cruisers and destroyers shelled the harbor at Casablanca during the day. She sank in the harbor during the night of 8–9 November 1942 at 33°06′30″N 007°36′58″W.

Fighting between Allied and Vichy French forces in French North Africa ended on 11 November 1942, and French forces in Africa switched to the Allied side, joining the forces of Free France. The Allies refloated Amphitrite on 12 March 1943. She was placed in "special reserve" at Casablanca but never repaired. She was condemned on 26 March 1946 and stricken from the navy list in May 1946.
