= French submarine Eurydice =

Two submarines of the French Navy have borne the name Eurydice:

- French submarine Eurydice (Q130), an Ariane-class submarine launched in 1927 and scuttled in 1942
- French submarine Eurydice (S644), a Daphné-class submarine launched in 1962 and lost in 1970
