= French ship Sfax =

At least two ships of the French Navy have borne the name Sfax:

- French cruiser Sfax, a protected cruiser launched in 1884 and stricken in 1906
- French submarine Sfax, a Redoutable-class submarine launched in 1934 and sunk in 1940
