= French submarine Ariane (Q122) =

WWII French naval submarine

Ariane
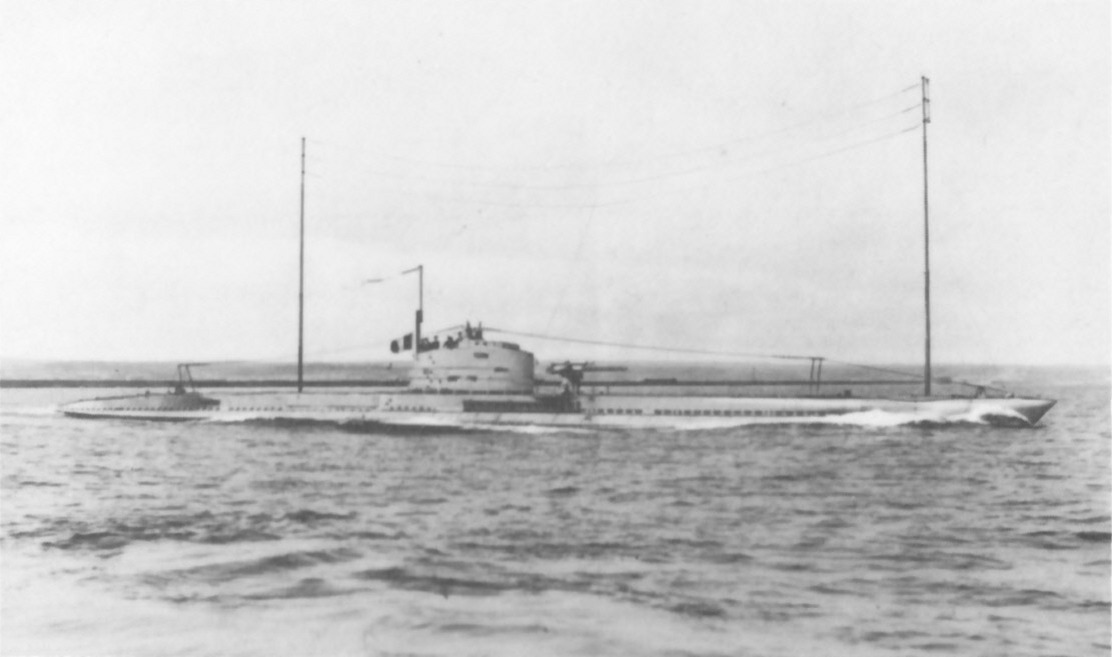
- Ariane in 1930.

History

France
- Name: Ariane
- Namesake: Ariadne, a Cretan princess in Greek mythology
- Operator: French Navy
- Ordered: 1922
- Builder: Chantiers et Ateliers Augustin Normand, Le Havre, France
- Laid down: 8 February 1923
- Launched: 6 August 1925
- Commissioned: 1 September 1929
- Fate: Scuttled 9 November 1942

General characteristics
- Class & type: Ariane-class submarine
- Displacement: 626 long tons (636 t) (surfaced); 787 long tons (800 t) (submerged)
- Length: 64 or 65.98 m (210 ft 0 in or 216 ft 6 in) (sources disagree)
- Beam: 4.92 or 6.2 m (16 ft 2 in or 20 ft 4 in) (sources disagree)
- Draft: 3.82 or 4.1 m (12 ft 6 in or 13 ft 5 in) (sources disagree)
- Propulsion: 2 x 600 hp (447 kW) Vickers diesel engines; 2 x 500 hp (373 kW) electric motors
- Speed: 14 kn (26 km/h; 16 mph) (surfaced); 7.5 kn (13.9 km/h; 8.6 mph) (submerged)
- Range: 3,500 nmi (6,500 km; 4,000 mi) at 7.5 knots (13.9 km/h; 8.6 mph) (surface); 75 nmi (139 km; 86 mi) at 5 knots (9.3 km/h; 5.8 mph) (submerged)
- Test depth: 80 m (262 ft)
- Complement: 3 officers, 38 men
- Armament: 7 x 21.7 in (550 mm) torpedo tubes (6 bow/1 stern) or (3 internal bow/2 rotating external bow/2 stern) (sources disagree); 1 x 75 mm (2.95 in) deck gun; 1 or 2 x 13.2 mm (0.52 in) machine guns (sources disagree)

Ariane (Q122) was a French Navy Ariane-class submarine commissioned in 1929. During World War II, she operated on the Allied side until 1940, when she became part of the naval forces of Vichy France. She was scuttled in November 1942.

== Construction and commissioning ==
Ordered under the 1922 naval programme, Ariane was laid down along with her sister ship Ondine at Chantiers et Ateliers Augustin Normand in Le Havre, France, on 8 February 1923 with the hull number Q122. She was launched on 6 August 1925. After fitting out, she began her builder's trials on 15 December 1926 and her official acceptance trials on 27 July 1927. Her final equipping and armament for service took place at Cherbourg, France, from 1 June to 3 July 1929, and she was commissioned along with her sister ship Eurydice on 1 September 1929.

== Service history ==
=== French Navy ===
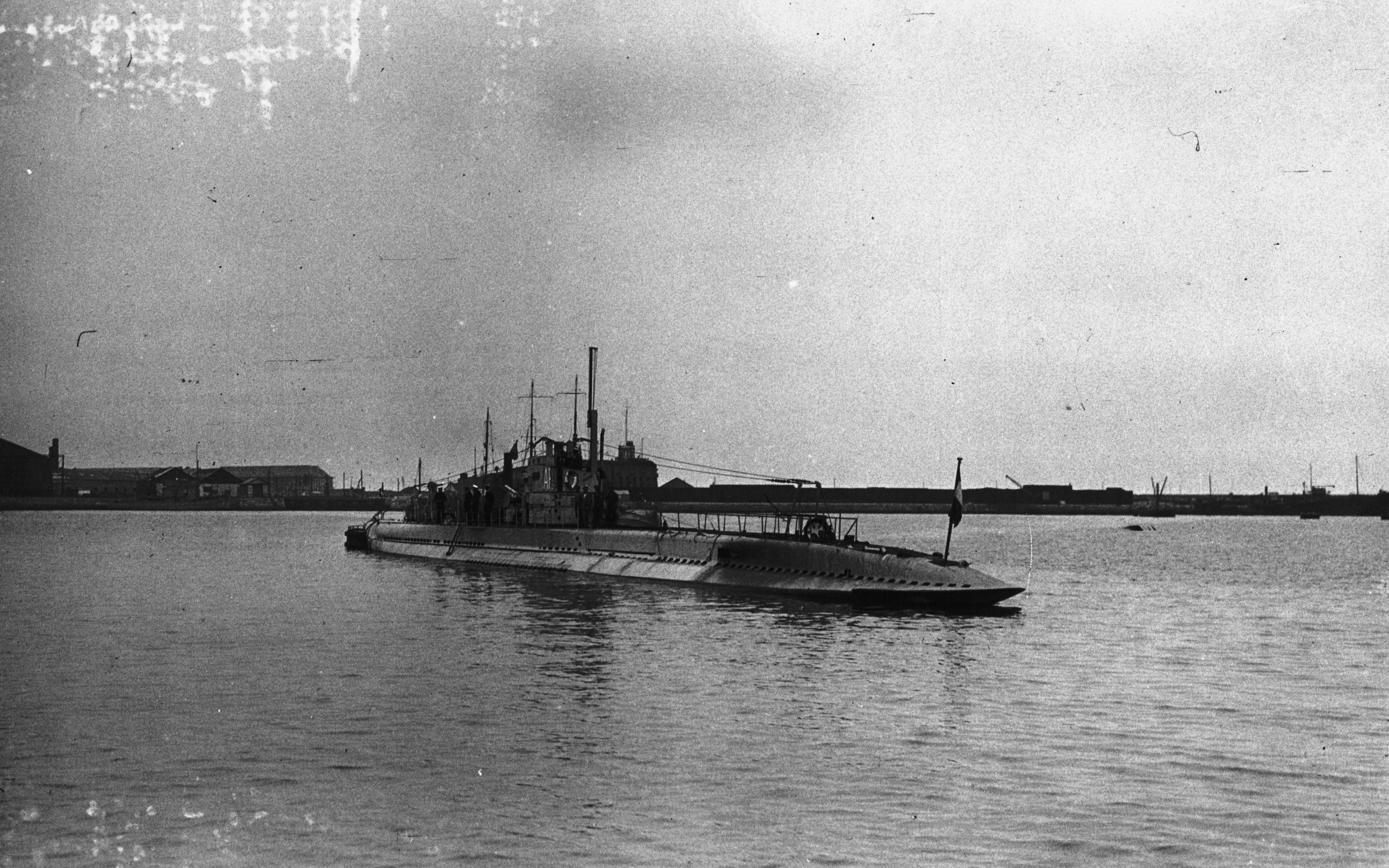
Ariane at Cherbourg, France, on 10 July 1932.

In 1939, prior to the outbreak of World War II, Ariane was based at Cherbourg. When World War II began on 1 September 1939 with the German invasion of Poland, Ariane was part of the 14th Submarine Division — a part of the 2nd Submarine Squadron in the 6th Squadron — along with her sister ships Danaé and Eurydice and the submarine Diane, based at Oran in Algeria. France entered the war on the side of the Allies on 3 September 1939, and subsequently Ariane took part in surveillance of the Canary Islands, where the Allies believed that German cargo ships had taken refuge at the beginning of the war and were serving as supply ships for German U-boats.

German ground forces advanced into France on 10 May 1940, beginning the Battle of France, and Italy declared war on France on 10 June 1940 and joined the invasion. The Battle of France ended in France's defeat and an armistice with Germany and Italy on 22 June 1940. When the armistice went into effect on 25 June 1940, Ariane still was based at Oran.

=== Vichy France ===
After France's surrender, Ariane served in the naval forces of Vichy France. On 3 July 1940, the British began Operation Catapult, which sought to seize or neutralize the ships of the French Navy to prevent their use by the Germans, and Ariane was in port at the French naval base at Mers El Kébir at Oran that day when a British naval squadron arrived off the base and demanded that the French Navy either turn over the ships based there to British custody or disable them. The French put their submarines at Oran on alert, and at 15:00 Ariane and Danaé were ready for sea. They anchored in the outer harbor at 15:30 with Diane and Eurydice, and at 17:54 the four submarines received orders to put to sea.

When the British warships opened fire on the French ships in the harbor at 17:57, beginning their attack on Mers-el-Kébir, Ariane was 4 nautical miles (7.4 km; 4.6 mi) west of Diane, which in turn was 3.5 nautical miles (6.5 km; 4.0 mi) west of Pointe de l’Aiguille (35°52′31″N 000°29′04″W) in Oran Province. None of the four submarines was able to close with the British ships during the battle. That night, the submarines patrolled on the surface off Oran in a north–south patrol line. They remained on patrol off Oran until 20:00 on 4 July 1940 before returning to Oran.

As Operation Catapult continued, British forces attacked the French squadron at Dakar in Senegal on 8 July 1940. Receiving word of the attack, French naval authorities at Oran ordered Ariane, Diane, and Eurydice to form a patrol line off Cape Falcon, Algeria.

In October 1940, Ariane was placed under guard at Oran in an unarmed and unfueled status in accordance with the terms of the 22 June 1940 armistice.

=== Loss ===
Ariane still was in this status when Allied forces invaded French North Africa in Operation Torch on 8 November 1942. She was scuttled at Oran on 9 November 1942 to prevent her capture by Allied forces.
