= French submarine Méduse (NN5) =

French Navy Diane-class submarine commissioned 1932

History

France
- Name: Méduse
- Namesake: Medusa, one of the three monstrous Gorgons in Greek mythology
- Operator: French Navy
- Laid down: 1 January 1928
- Launched: 26 August 1930
- Commissioned: 1 September 1932
- Fate: Beached and scuttled 10 November 1942; Refloated 18 November 1942; Not repaired

General characteristics
- Class & type: Diane-class submarine
- Type: submarine
- Displacement: 571 long tons (580 t) (surfaced); 809 long tons (822 t) (submerged)
- Length: 64.4 m (211 ft)
- Beam: 6.2 m (20 ft)
- Draught: 4.3 m (14 ft)
- Propulsion: 2 × diesels (1,400 bhp); 2 × electric motors (1,000 shp)
- Speed: surfaced 13,7 knots; submerged 9 knots

Méduse (NN5) was a French Navy Diane-class submarine commissioned in 1932. During World War II, she operated on the Allied side until 1940, when she became part of the naval forces of Vichy France. She was wrecked in November 1942.

== Construction and commissioning ==
Méduse was authorized in the 1926 naval program under the naval law of 29 April 1926. and her keel was laid down at Chantiers et Ateliers Augustin Normand in Le Havre, France, on 1 January 1928. She was launched on 26 August 1930 and commissioned at Cherbourg, France, on 1 September 1932.

== Service history ==
=== French Navy ===
In November 1934, Méduse, her sister ships Amazone and La Psyché, and the submarine Danaé visited Leith, Scotland.

When World War II began on 1 September 1939 with the German invasion of Poland, Méduse was part of the 18th Submarine Division — a part of the 2nd Submarine Squadron in the 6th Squadron — along with her sister ships Amphitrite, Oréade, and La Psyché, based at Oran in Algeria. France entered the war on the side of the Allies on 3 September 1939. Later in 1939 and in early 1940, she conducted patrols off the Canary Islands.

German ground forces advanced into France, the Netherlands, Belgium, and Luxembourg on 10 May 1940, beginning the Battle of France, and Italy declared war on France on 10 June 1940 and joined the invasion. By 15 June 1940, Méduse was at Brest, France. As German ground forces approached Brest on 18 June 1940, all French ships received orders at 18:00 to evacuate the port, with those unable to get underway ordered to scuttle themselves. At 18:30, the submarine tender Jules Verne and 13 submarines, including Méduse, got underway from Brest bound for Casablanca, French Morocco, which they reached on 23 June 1940.

The Battle of France ended in France's defeat and armistices with Germany on 22 June 1940 and with Italy on 24 June. When both of the armistices went into effect on 25 June 1940, Méduse was at Casablanca, still in the 18th Submarine Division and still home-ported at Oran.

=== Vichy France ===
After France's surrender, Méduse served in the naval forces of Vichy France. On 3 July 1940, the British began Operation Catapult, which sought to seize or neutralize the ships of the French Navy to prevent their use by the Axis powers. The Royal Navy′s Force H arrived off the French naval base at Mers El Kébir on the coast of Algeria near Oran that day and demanded that the French Navy either turn over the ships based there to British custody or disable them. When the French refused, the British warships opened fire on the French ships in the harbor in the attack on Mers-el-Kébir. Concerned that the British might also attack the incomplete battleship Jean Bart at Casablanca, French forces at Casablanca went on alert that day, and that evening Méduse, Amazone and Amphitrite put to sea to establish a standing submarine patrol along a 20-nautical-mile (37 km; 23 mi) radius from Casablanca. On 13 July 1940, Méduse and Amphitrite again got underway from Casablanca, this time with the submarine Calypso, to relieve the submarines Casabianca, Poncelet, and Sfax on the patrol line 20 nautical miles (37 km; 23 mi) from Casablanca.

On 7 September 1940, Méduse accidentally ran aground off Casablanca. She subsequently was placed under guard in a disarmed and unfueled state under the terms of the June 1940 armistices. By 23 October 1940 she was part of the 13th Submarine Division, in which she remained through at least March 1941.

Méduse was reactivated at Oran in April 1942. By 1 November 1942 she was based in French Morocco as part of the 17th Submarine Division. By 8 November 1942 she was part of the 18th Submarine Division.

Operation Torch, the Allied amphibious landings in French Morocco and Algeria, began in the predawn hours of 8 November 1942. That morning at 05:15, Méduse got underway from Casablanca to resist the invasion, with orders to patrol in the Atlantic Ocean in Sector 2 off French Morocco bearing between 125 degrees and 165 degrees from El Hank. With the Naval Battle of Casablanca raging between United States Navy and Vichy French forces, she came under attack several times by a floatplane from the U.S. Navy light cruiser USS Philadelphia (CL-41) but suffered no damage. At 09:50, she sighted the U.S. Navy battleship USS Massachusetts (BB-59) followed by the heavy cruisers USS Tuscaloosa (CA-37) and USS Wichita (CA-45). Shortly after 10:00, she fired a spread of four torpedoes at Massachusetts, which narrowly avoided them. She then headed back to Casablanca to rearm. As Méduse approached Casablanca on the surface, she came under attack and suffered bow damage. Her commanding officer decided to make for El Hank to recharge her batteries, but along the way she sustained additional damage and suffered three wounded when U.S. aircraft strafed her with machine guns. At 18:20 she headed for Safi, where her commanding officer planned to put her wounded ashore and make repairs.

On 9 November 1942, a floatplane from Philadelphia bombed Méduse near Cape Cantin, inflicting additional damage on her. She submerged and struck the seabed, then resurfaced at 18:30. Her second officer was sent to Safi to alert French authorities there that she would arrive there overnight. A vessel she identified as a vedette then approached, forcing her to submerge. After she surfaced again, her commanding officer decided to make for Mazagan instead, but Méduse had two punctured ballast tanks and had taken on a 20-degree list to starboard and could not make port.

Méduse′s commanding officer decided to beach her, put her wounded ashore, and scuttle her. At 06:40 on 10 November 1942, Méduse beached herself at Mazagan north of Cape Blanco at 33°25′N 008°40′W, and after evacuating her wounded her crew opened all of her water intakes and scuttled her. A floatplane from Philadelphia sighted her that day after she beached herself, finding her down by the stern and listing heavily to port, and bombed her again.

Fighting between Allied and Vichy French forces in French North Africa ended on 11 November 1942, and French forces in Africa subsequently switched to the Allied side, joining the forces of Free France. Méduse was refloated on 18 November 1942 and towed to Mazagan, but never returned to service.

== Honors and awards ==
For his actions during the Naval Battle of Casablanca, Méduse′s commanding officer received a citation from the French Navy which read in part:

[Méduse] attacked on November 8 a battleship (the Massachusetts) off Casablanca despite a very strong reaction by the escorts. Attacked by aircraft, [Méduse] responded with her machine guns, then by diving in spite of very serious damage. [Her commanding officer] tried everything for 36 hours to save his vessel, showing, in particularly perilous and difficult circumstances, magnificent qualities of energy, courage, and coolness.
