= French submarine Eurydice (Q130) =

Ariane-class submarine launched in 1927

Eurydice
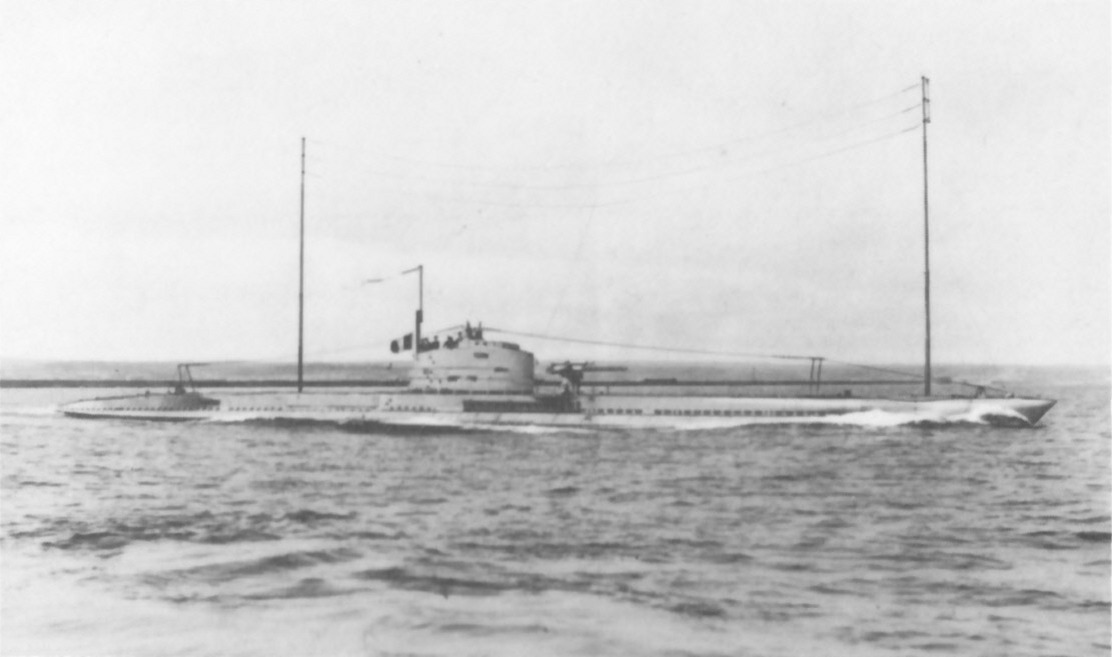
- Eurydice′s sister ship Ariane in 1930.

History

France
- Name: Eurydice
- Namesake: Eurydice, the wife of Orpheus in Greek mythology
- Operator: French Navy
- Ordered: 1923
- Builder: Chantiers et Ateliers Augustin Normand, Le Havre, France
- Laid down: 3 July 1923
- Launched: 31 May 1927
- Commissioned: 1 September 1929
- Fate: Scuttled 27 November 1942; Refloated 25 June 1943, not repaired; Sunk 22 June 1944; Refloated 1945; Scrapped

General characteristics
- Class & type: Ariane-class submarine
- Displacement: 626 long tons (636 t) (surfaced); 787 long tons (800 t) (submerged)
- Length: 64 or 65.98 m (210 ft 0 in or 216 ft 6 in) (sources disagree)
- Beam: 4.92 or 6.2 m (16 ft 2 in or 20 ft 4 in) (sources disagree)
- Draft: 3.82 or 4.1 m (12 ft 6 in or 13 ft 5 in) (sources disagree)
- Propulsion: 2 x 600 hp (447 kW) Vickers diesel engines; 2 x 500 hp (373 kW) electric motors
- Speed: 14 kn (26 km/h; 16 mph) (surfaced); 7.5 kn (13.9 km/h; 8.6 mph) (submerged)
- Range: 3,500 nmi (6,500 km; 4,000 mi) at 7.5 knots (13.9 km/h; 8.6 mph) (surface); 75 nmi (139 km; 86 mi) at 5 knots (9.3 km/h; 5.8 mph) (submerged)
- Test depth: 80 m (262 ft)
- Complement: 3 officers, 38 men
- Armament: 7 x 21.7 in (550 mm) torpedo tubes (6 bow/1 stern) or (3 internal bow/2 rotating external bow/2 stern) (sources disagree); 1 x 75 mm (2.95 in) deck gun; 1 or 2 x 13.2 mm (0.52 in) machine guns (sources disagree)

Eurydice (Q130) was a French Navy Ariane-class submarine commissioned in 1929. During World War II, she operated on the Allied side until 1940, when she became part of the naval forces of Vichy France. She was scuttled in November 1942.

== Construction and commissioning ==
Ordered under the 1923 naval programme, Eurydice was laid down along with her sister ship Danaé at Chantiers et Ateliers Augustin Normand in Le Havre, France, on 3 July 1923 with the hull number Q123. She was launched on 31 May 1927. After fitting out, she began her builder′s trials on 1 July 1927. On 7 October 1927, she departed Le Havre bound for Cherbourg, France, but returned to Le Havre the same day for unknown reasons. She soon got back underway for Cherbourg, arriving there on 8 October 1927.

Eurydice′s official acceptance trials began with her arrival at Cherbourg. She docked at Cherbourg Naval Base on 8 December 1928 to carry out tests, and she departed Cherbourg on 3, 4, 9, and 16 April 1929 for exercises. On 2 May 1929, she put to sea from Cherbourg for diving exercises. After completing her equipping and arming work at Cherbourg on 27 June 1929, she called at Brest, France, from 9 to 15 July 1929 before returning to Cherbourg. She was commissioned along with her sister ship Ariane on 1 September 1929.

== Service history ==
=== Pre-World War II ===
Eurydice arrived at Casablanca in French Morocco on 19 June 1930. In July 1932, she participated in the investigation of the loss of the submarine Prométhée, which had sunk suddenly in the English Channel during her sea trials on 7 July 1932 with the loss of 62 lives. Eurydice subsequently arrived at Île-de-Bréhat on 18 September 1932 and at Brest on 25 September 1932.

Eurydice arrived at Cherbourg on 10 May 1933 and at Brest on 24 May 1934. She got underway from Cherbourg on 6 June 1934 for exercises, returning to Cherbourg on 13 June 1934. After arriving at Le Havre on 22 November 1934, she returned to Cherbourg, which she reached on 24 November 1934. On 28 November 1934, she got underway from Cherbourg to conduct exercises with the submarines Oréade and Orphée.

On 12 March 1935, Eurydice arrived at Dieppe from Le Havre. She got back underway on 15 March 1935 bound for Boulogne. She arrived at Le Havre on 15 April 1935.

Eurydice arrived at Paimpol from Cherbourg on 14 August 1936. On 16 October 1936, she departed Le Havre bound for Dunkirk. On 30 October 1936, she arrived at Paimpol after a voyage from Carantec.

=== World War II ===
==== French Navy ====
When World War II began on 1 September 1939 with the German invasion of Poland, Eurydice was part of the 14th Submarine Division — a part of the 2nd Submarine Squadron in the 6th Squadron — along with her sister ships Ariane and Danaé and the submarine Diane, based at Oran in Algeria. France entered the war on the side of the Allies on 3 September 1939. German ground forces advanced into France on 10 May 1940, beginning the Battle of France, and Italy declared war on France on 10 June 1940 and joined the invasion. The Battle of France ended in France's defeat and an armistice with Germany and Italy on 22 June 1940. When the armistice went into effect on 25 June 1940, Eurydice still was based at Oran.

==== Vichy France ====
After France′s surrender, Eurydice served in the naval forces of Vichy France. On 3 July 1940, the British began Operation Catapult, which sought to seize or neutralize the ships of the French Navy to prevent their use by the Germans, and Eurydice was in port at the French naval base at Mers El Kébir at Oran that day when a British naval squadron arrived off the base and demanded that the French Navy either turn over the ships based there to British custody or disable them. The French put their submarines at Oran on alert, and at 13:30 Eurydice and Diane were ready for sea. They anchored in the outer harbor at 15:30 with Ariane and Danaé, and at 17:54 the four submarines received orders to put to sea.

When the British warships opened fire on the French ships in the harbor at 17:57, beginning their attack on Mers-el-Kébir, Eurydice was 4.5 nautical miles (8.3 km; 5.2 mi) southwest of Danaé. None of the four submarines was able to close with the British ships during the battle. Shortly before 20:00, a British aircraft sighted Eurydice and Danaé and dropped illuminated floats to guide a British destroyer to them. The destroyer depth-charged the two submarines, but they escaped damage. During the night of 3–4 July 1940, the four submarines patrolled on the surface off Oran in a north-south patrol line. All four submarines remained on patrol off Oran until 20:00 on 4 July 1940 before returning to Oran.

As Operation Catapult continued, British forces attacked the French squadron at Dakar in Senegal on 8 July 1940. Receiving word of the attack, French naval authorities at Oran ordered Eurydice, Ariane, and Diane to form a patrol line off Cape Falcon, Algeria.

Eurydice was in a floating drydock at Mers El Kébir for a major refit from 1 to 15 October 1940. On 25 November 1940, she was armed for post-refit trials, which she conducted from 26 to 28 November 1940. She then began training exercises. On 14 May 1941, she was placed under guard at Toulon, France, in an unarmed and unfueled status in accordance with the terms of the 22 June 1940 armistice.

==== Loss ====
Eurydice still was in this status when Germany and Italy occupied the Free Zone (French: Zone libre) of Vichy France on 27 November 1942, and she was among the French vessels scuttled at Toulon to prevent their seizure by Germany when German forces entered Toulon that day, sinking in the Northwest Basin at the Missiessy Docks. She was refloated on 25 June 1943. The Germans declared her unusable on 26 January 1944 and moved her to Brégaillon, where Allied bombers sank her on 22 June 1944. Refloated again in 1945, her hulk subsequently served as a float until she was scrapped.
