= French submarine Diane (NN4) =

French submarine

Diane
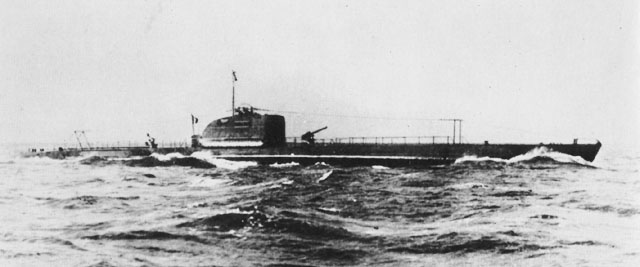
- Unknown Diane-class submarine

History

France
- Name: Diane
- Namesake: Diana, a goddess in Roman and Hellenistic religion
- Operator: French Navy
- Ordered: 1926
- Builder: Chantiers et Ateliers Augustin Normand, Le Havre, France
- Laid down: 25 April 1927
- Launched: 13 May 1930
- Commissioned: 1 September 1932
- Fate: Scuttled 9 November 1942; Wreck condemned 1944

General characteristics
- Class & type: Diane-class submarine
- Displacement: 571 long tons (580 t) (surfaced); 809 long tons (822 t) (submerged)
- Length: 64.4 m (211 ft 3 in)
- Beam: 6.2 m (20 ft 4 in)
- Draft: 4.3 m (14 ft 1 in)
- Propulsion: 2 x 650 hp (485 kW) Normand-Vickers diesel engines; 2 x 500 hp (373 kW) electric motors
- Speed: 13.7 or 14 kn (25.4 or 25.9 km/h; 15.8 or 16.1 mph) (surfaced) (sources disagree); 9 or 9.2 kn (16.7 or 17.0 km/h; 10.4 or 10.6 mph) (submerged) (sources disagree)
- Range: 4,000 nmi (7,400 km; 4,600 mi) at 10 knots (19 km/h; 12 mph) (surface); 82 or 85 nmi (152 or 157 km; 94 or 98 mi) at 5 knots (9.3 km/h; 5.8 mph) (submerged) (sources disagree)
- Test depth: 80 metres (262 ft)
- Complement: 3 officers, 38 men
- Armament: 3 × 550 mm (21.7 in) bow torpedo tubes; 3 × 550 mm (21.7 in) torpedo tubes in forward external rotating turret; 1 × 550 mm (21.7 in) and 2 x 400 mm (15.7 in) torpedo tubes in after external rotating turret; 1 × 76.2 mm (3 in) deck gun; 1 × 13.2 mm (0.5 in) machine gun; 2 × 8 mm (0.31 in) machine guns

Diane was a French Navy Diane-class submarine commissioned in 1932, the lead ship of her class. During World War II, she operated on the Allied side until 1940, when she became part of the naval forces of Vichy France. She was scuttled in November 1942.

== Construction and commissioning ==
Ordered in 1926 under Naval Program 75, Diane was laid down at Chantiers et Ateliers Augustin Normand in Le Havre, France, on 25 April 1927. She was launched on 13 May 1930. After fitting out, she was commissioned for trials on 15 July 1930. Her official trials began on 2 January 1931, and her final equipping and armament took place at Cherbourg, France, from 1 April 1931 to 30 January 1932. She was placed in full commission on 1 September 1932.

== Service history ==
=== Pre-World War II ===
Diane lost a member of her crew on 25 May 1937, during a visit to Bénodet, France, who drowned while attempting to swim about 300 metres (330 yd) from shore to Diane. The incident occurred after he and three other crewmen had returned to shore. When the boat that they were trying to use to reach Diane began to fill with water, three of the men decided to swim to Diane. One of them did not make it.

=== World War II ===
==== French Navy ====
When World War II began on 1 September 1939 with the German invasion of Poland, Diane was part of the 14th Submarine Division — a part of the 2nd Submarine Squadron in the 6th Squadron — along with the submarines Ariane, Danaé, and Eurydice, based at Oran in Algeria. France entered the war on the side of the Allies on 3 September 1939. Diane subsequently patrolled in the Atlantic Ocean in the vicinity of Madeira.

German ground forces advanced into France on 10 May 1940, beginning the Battle of France, and Italy declared war on France on 10 June 1940 and joined the invasion. The Battle of France ended in France's defeat and an armistice with Germany and Italy on 22 June 1940. When the armistice went into effect on 25 June 1940, Diane still was based at Oran.

==== Vichy France ====
After France′s surrender, Diane served in the naval forces of Vichy France. On 3 July 1940, the British began Operation Catapult, which sought to seize or neutralize the ships of the French Navy to prevent their use by the Germans, and Diane was in port at the French naval base at Mers El Kébir at Oran that day when a British naval squadron arrived off the base and demanded that the French Navy either turn over the ships based there to British custody or disable them. The French put their submarines at Oran on alert, and at 13:30 Diane and Eurydice were ready for sea They anchored in the outer harbor at 15:00 or 15:30 (sources disagree) with Ariane and Danaé, and at 17:54 the four submarines received orders to put to sea.

When the British warships opened fire on the French ships in the harbor at 17:57, beginning their attack on Mers-el-Kébir, Diane was 3.5 nautical miles (6.5 km; 4.0 mi) west of Pointe de l’Aiguille (35°52′31″N 000°29′04″W) in Oran Province. None of the four submarines was able to close with the British ships during the battle. During the night of 3–4 July 1940, the four submarines patrolled on the surface off Oran in a north-south patrol line. All four submarines remained on patrol off Oran until 20:00 on 4 July 1940 before returning to Oran.

As Operation Catapult continued, British forces attacked the French squadron at Dakar in Senegal on 8 July 1940. Receiving word of the attack, French naval authorities at Oran ordered Eurydice, Ariane, and Diane to form a patrol line off Cape Falcon, Algeria.

Diane spent August and September 1940 at Toulon, France, then returned to Oran. From October 1941 to May 1942, she was under guard at Oran in an unarmed and unfueled status in accordance with the terms of the 22 June 1940 armistice. By 1 November 1942, still in that status, she was part of the 12th Submarine Division.

==== Loss ====
Diane still was in her unarmed and unfueled status at Oran when Allied forces invaded French North Africa in Operation Torch on 8 November 1942. She was scuttled at Oran on 9 November 1942 to prevent her capture by Allied forces. Her wreck was condemned in 1944.
