= Diane-class submarine (1930) =

Group of submarines built for the French navy during the 1930s

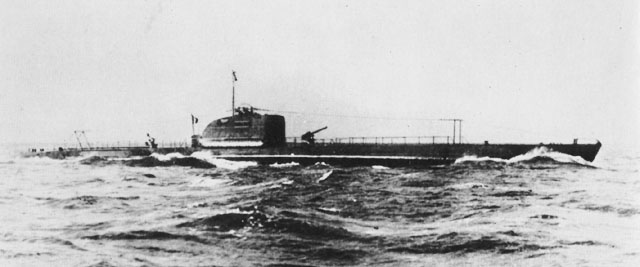
- An unidentified Diane-class submarine.

Class overview
- Name: Diane class
- Operators: French Navy
- Preceded by: 600 Series submarines
- Succeeded by: Orion class
- Built: 1930–1933
- In commission: 1931–1946
- Completed: 9
- Lost: 6
- Scrapped: 3

General characteristics (as built)
- Type: Submarine
- Displacement: 571 long tons (580 t) (surfaced); 809 long tons (822 t) (submerged)
- Length: 64.4 m (211 ft 3 in)
- Beam: 6.2 m (20 ft 4 in)
- Draught: 4.3 m (14 ft 1 in)
- Installed power: 1,400 bhp (1,000 kW) (diesels); 1,000 shp (750 kW) (electric motors)
- Propulsion: 2 × diesel engines; 2 × electric motors
- Speed: 14 knots (26 km/h; 16 mph) (surfaced); 9 knots (17 km/h; 10 mph) (submerged)
- Range: 4,000 nmi (7,400 km; 4,600 mi) at 10 knots (19 km/h; 12 mph) (surfaced); 85 nmi (157 km; 98 mi) at 5 knots (9.3 km/h; 5.8 mph) (submerged)
- Complement: 41
- Armament: 3 × 550 mm (21.7 in) bow torpedo tubes; 3 × 400 mm (15.7 in) external torpedo tubes; 1 × 76.2 mm (3.0 in) deck gun

The Diane-class submarines were a group of nine submarines built for the French Navy during the 1930s. Six boats were sunk during the Second World War and the others were sold for scrap in 1946.

== Ships ==
Ship	Laid down	Launched	Commissioned	Fate
Diane	4 January 1928	15 May 1930	1 September 1932	Scuttled 9 November 1942
Méduse	1 January 1928	26 August 1930	1 September 1932	Wrecked 10 November 1942
Antiope	28 December 1928	19 August 1930	12 October 1933	Stricken 26 April 1946
Amphitrite	8 August 1928	20 December 1930	8 June 1933	Sunk 8 November 1942
Amazone	14 January 1929	28 December 1931	12 October 1933	Stricken 26 April 1946
Orphée	22 August 1929	10 November 1931	8 June 1933	Stricken 15 April 1946
Oréade	15 August 1929	25 May 1932	14 December 1933	Sunk 8 November 1942
La Sibylle	10 January 1931	28 January 1932	22 December 1934	Missing 8 November 1942
La Psyché	26 December 1930	4 August 1932	23 December 1933	Sunk 8 November 1942

== Bibliography ==
- Moulin, Jean (April–May 2022). "Les sous-marins type Antiope des budgets 1927, 1928, 1929" [The Antope-Class Submarines of the 1927, 1928, 1929 Budgets]. Navires & Histoire (in French) (130): 66–75. ISSN 1280-4290.
- Roberts, John (1980). "France". In Chesneau, Roger (ed.). Conway's All the World's Fighting Ships 1922–1946. New York: Mayflower Books. pp. 255–279. ISBN 0-8317-0303-2.
