= French submarine Oréade =

Oréade
History

France
- Name: Oréade
- Namesake: Oread, a mountain nymph in Greek mythology
- Operator: French Navy
- Builder: Ateliers et Chantiers de la Seine-Maritime, Le Trait, France
- Laid down: 15 August 1929
- Launched: 23 May 1932
- Commissioned: 15 December 1933
- Fate: Sunk 8 November 1942; Refloated 10 June 1943; Special reserve 29 September 1943; Condemned 26 March 1946

General characteristics
- Class & type: Diane-class submarine
- Displacement: 571 long tons (580 t) (surfaced); 809 long tons (822 t) (submerged)
- Length: 64.4 m (211 ft 3 in)
- Beam: 6.2 m (20 ft 4 in)
- Draft: 4.3 m (14 ft 1 in)
- Propulsion: 2 x 650 hp (485 kW) Normand-Vickers diesel engines; 2 x 500 hp (373 kW) electric motors
- Speed: 13.7 or 14 kn (25.4 or 25.9 km/h; 15.8 or 16.1 mph) (surfaced) (sources disagree); 9 or 9.2 kn (16.7 or 17.0 km/h; 10.4 or 10.6 mph) (submerged) (sources disagree)
- Range: 4,000 nmi (7,400 km; 4,600 mi) at 10 knots (19 km/h; 12 mph) (surface); 82 or 85 nmi (152 or 157 km; 94 or 98 mi) at 5 knots (9.3 km/h; 5.8 mph) (submerged) (sources disagree)
- Test depth: 80 metres (262 ft)
- Complement: 3 officers, 38 men
- Armament: 3 × 550 mm (21.7 in) bow torpedo tubes; 3 × 550 mm (21.7 in) torpedo tubes in forward external rotating turret; 1 × 550 mm (21.7 in) and 2 x 400 mm (15.7 in) torpedo tubes in after external rotating turret; 1 × 76.2 mm (3 in) deck gun; 1 × 13.2 mm (0.5 in) machine gun; 2 × 8 mm (0.31 in) machine guns

Oréade (Q164) was a French Navy Diane-class submarine commissioned in 1933. During World War II, she operated on the Allied side until 1940, when she became part of the naval forces of Vichy France. She was sunk in November 1942.

== Construction and commissioning ==
Construction of Oréade began on 18 December 1928, and her keel was laid down at Ateliers et Chantiers de la Seine-Maritime in Le Trait, France, on 15 August 1929. She was launched on 23 May 1932. After fitting out, she was commissioned for trials on 15 August 1932. Her official trials began on 2 December 1932, and her final equipping and armament took place at Cherbourg, France, from 1 October to 10 November 1933. She was placed in full commission on 15 December 1933.

== Service history ==
=== Pre-World War II ===
On 28 November 1934, the submarine Eurydice got underway from Cherbourg to conduct exercises with Oréade and Oréade′s sister ship Orphée.

=== World War II ===
==== French Navy ====
When World War II began on 1 September 1939 with the German invasion of Poland, Oréade was part of the 18th Submarine Division — a part of the 2nd Submarine Squadron in the 6th Squadron — along with her sister ships Amphitrite, Méduse, and La Psyché, based at Oran in Algeria. France entered the war on the side of the Allies on 3 September 1939. Oréade subsequently patrolled in the Atlantic Ocean in the vicinity of the Canary Islands. She underwent a refit at Oran in December 1939.

German ground forces advanced into France on 10 May 1940, beginning the Battle of France, and Italy declared war on France on 10 June 1940 and joined the invasion. The Battle of France ended in France's defeat and an armistice with Germany and Italy on 22 June 1940. When the armistice went into effect on 25 June 1940, Oréade still was based at Oran.

==== Vichy France ====
After France′s surrender, Oréade served in the naval forces of Vichy France. In the succeeding months she spent time at Bizerte in Tunisia in August 1940; Toulon, France, in October 1940; Casablanca in French Morocco in December 1940; and Dakar in Senegal in February 1941. During July 1941, she visited first Agadir and then Casablanca in French Morocco.

In January 1942 Oréade conducted defensive patrols off ports in French Morocco, and during the month she spent 7 to 19 January at Safi, French Morocco, with La Psyché. The two submarines visited Port Lyautey, French Morocco, from 13 to 17 February 1942.

Oréade was disarmed at Casablanca in March 1942 in accordance with the terms of the 1940 armistice. She returned to active service in September 1942. Still part of the 18th Submarine Division, she got underway from Oran on 30 October 1942 bound for Casablanca.

==== Loss ====
When Operation Torch, the Allied invasion of French North Africa, began on the morning of 8 November 1942, Oréade was moored at Casablanca. The Naval Battle of Casablanca began that morning, and bomb-armed United States Navy TBF Avenger torpedo bombers from the aircraft carrier USS Ranger (CV-4) and the escort carrier USS Suwannee (CVE-27) attacked the harbor at 07:10. After taking bomb damage, Oréade capsized and sank, suffering four dead and six wounded. Her commanding officer was among the wounded, and he died of his wounds later in the day, raising Oréade's death toll to five.

Hostilities between Allied and French forces in French North Africa ceased on 11 November 1942, and French forces in Africa subsequently joined the Allies as part of the forces of Free France. Oréade was refloated on 10 June 1943 and placed in "special reserve" on 29 September 1943 at Casablanca. She was condemned on 26 March 1946.
