= French submarine Amazone (Q161) =

History

France
- Name: Amazone
- Namesake: Amazon, a female warrior in Greek mythology
- Operator: French Navy
- Builder: Ateliers et Chantiers de la Seine-Maritime, Le Trait, France
- Laid down: 14 January 1929
- Launched: 28 December 1931
- Commissioned: 12 October 1933
- Stricken: 26 April 1946
- Fate: Condemned 26 April 1946

General characteristics
- Class & type: Diane-class submarine
- Displacement: 571 long tons (580 t) (surfaced); 809 long tons (822 t) (submerged)
- Length: 64.4 m (211 ft)
- Beam: 6.2 m (20 ft)
- Draught: 4.3 m (14 ft)
- Propulsion: 2 × diesel engines, 1,400 bhp (1,044 kW); 2 × electric motors, 1,000 shp (746 kW)
- Speed: surfaced 13.7 knots (25.4 km/h; 15.8 mph); submerged 9 knots (17 km/h; 10 mph)

Amazone (Q161) was a French Navy Diane-class submarine commissioned in 1933. During World War II, she operated on the Allied side until 1940, when she became part of the naval forces of Vichy France. In 1942 she joined the Free French Naval Forces. She was stricken in 1946.

== Construction and commissioning ==
Amazone was authorized in the 1927 program under the naval law of 19 December 1926. Her keel was laid down by Ateliers et Chantiers de la Seine-Maritime at Le Trait, France, on 22 August 1929. She was launched on 28 December 1931 and commissioned on 12 October 1933.

== Service history ==
=== French Navy ===
When World War II began on 1 September 1939 with the German invasion of Poland, Amazone was part of the 16th Submarine Division — under the command of the 1st Maritime Prefecture at the Submarine Center — at Cherbourg along with her sister ships Antiope, Orphée, and Sibylle. France entered the war on the side of the Allies on 3 September 1939.

In 1940 the Allies made plans to intervene in Norway to prevent the shipment of iron ore from Sweden to Germany via Narvik on the Norwegian coast. Twelve French submarines were to participate in the operation, including the four submarines of the 16th Division, under the overall command of Royal Navy Vice Admiral Max Horton. Accordingly, all four submarines of the 16th Submarine Division got underway in company with the French Navy submarine tender Jules Verne and proceeded to Harwich, England, where they arrived on 22 March 1940. At Harwich, they formed the 10th Flotilla under Horton's command. The four submarines patrolled in the North Sea off the coast of the Netherlands until 7 April 1940 without success.

On 8 April 1940 German U-boats began operations in accordance with Operationsbefehl Hartmut ("Operation Order Hartmut") in support of Operation Weserübung, the German invasion of Norway and Denmark. Allied operations related to Norway became of greater urgency when the German invasion of both countries began on 9 April 1940. As they took part in the Norwegian campaign, the French submarines found limited facilities available to them at Harwich and had to rely largely on Jules Verne and spare parts sent from Cherbourg in France for repairs, some of which never were completed.

By 6 May 1940 the Allies had indications that a German invasion of the Netherlands was imminent, and that day Horton ordered all available submarines to put to sea. The submarines of the 16th Submarine Division received orders to join four other French, four British, and two Polish Navy submarines in forming a patrol line in the North Sea off the coast of the Netherlands to find and attack German submarines believed to be operating in the area. On 9 May 1940 Amazone avoided torpedoes a German U-boat fired at her.

The Battle of France began when German ground forces advanced into France, the Netherlands, Belgium, and Luxembourg on 10 May 1940. At 23:57 on 11 May 1940, Amazone fired two torpedoes at a submarine she identified as a German U-boat in the North Sea off the coast of the Netherlands at 52°55′N 004°28′E. Both the German submarine U-7 and the British submarine HMS Shark reported that a submarine had attacked them in that area at that time, and it remains unclear whether Amazone targeted U-7 or was involved in a friendly fire incident with Shark.

On 25 May 1940, Jules Verne and the submarines of the 2nd, 13th, and 16th Submarine Divisions arrived in Dundee, Scotland. On 4 June 1940, Jules Verne and all the French submarines assigned to her departed Dundee and proceeded to Brest, France. Italy declared war on France on 10 June 1940 and joined the invasion. As German ground forces approached Brest on 18 June 1940, all French ships received orders at 18:00 to evacuate the port, with those unable to get underway ordered to scuttle themselves. At 18:30, Jules Verne and 13 submarines, including Amazone, got underway from Brest bound for Casablanca, French Morocco, which they reached on 23 June 1940.

The Battle of France ended in France's defeat and armistices with Germany on 22 June 1940 and with Italy on 24 June. When the two armistices both went into effect on 25 June 1940, Amazone was at Casablanca.

=== Vichy France ===
After France′s surrender, Amazone served in the naval forces of Vichy France. On 3 July 1940, the British began Operation Catapult, which sought to seize or neutralize the ships of the French Navy to prevent their use by the Axis powers. The Royal Navy′s Force H arrived off the French naval base at Mers El Kébir near Oran in Algeria that day and demanded that the French Navy either turn over the ships based there to British custody or disable them. When the French refused, the British warships opened fire on the French ships in the harbor in the attack on Mers-el-Kébir. Concerned that the British might also attack the incomplete battleship Jean Bart at Casablanca, French forces at Casablanca went on alert that day, and that evening Amazone and the submarines Amphitrite and Méduse put to sea to establish a standing submarine patrol along a 20-nautical-mile (37 km; 23 mi) radius from Casablanca.

As of 23 October 1940, Amazone Antiope, Orphée, and Sibylle still constituted the 16th Submarine Division and were based in French Morocco. In 1941, Amazone was placed under guard in an unarmed and unfueled state in accordance with the June 1940 armistices. Subsequently reactivated, she was based at Dakar in Senegal in French West Africa by February 1942. As of 1 October 1942, she still was part of the 16th Submarine Division, which by then also included Amphitrite, Antiope, Sibylle, and the submarine Perle. She received orders on 20 October 1942 to proceed with Convoy D-60 to Port-Etienne in Mauritania and make a port call there from 25 to 30 October 1942, but these orders were rescinded when the 16th Submarine Division was relieved in French West Africa and ordered to proceed to Casablanca.

During the night of 7–8 November 1942, the French naval commander at Casablanca received indications that an Allied invasion of French North Africa was imminent and took action to resist it. Operation Torch, the Allied amphibious landings in French Morocco and Algeria, began in the predawn hours of 8 November. That morning at 06:13, Amazone departed Casablanca bound for a patrol area in the Atlantic Ocean off French Morocco bearing between 200 degrees and 210 degrees from El Hank off Roches Noires. At around 10:00, with the Naval Battle of Casablanca raging between United States Navy and Vichy French forces, she unsuccessfully attacked the U.S. Navy light cruiser USS Brooklyn (CL-40). Facing no counterattacks by U.S. forces, she returned to Casablanca, where she anchored in the outer harbor, then docked at the Delure pier to refuel.

On 9 November 1942 Amazone and Antiope got underway from Casablanca bound for Port-Etienne. While they were at sea, fighting between Allied and Vichy French forces in French North Africa ended on 11 November 1942. The two submarines arrived at Port-Etienne on 15 November 1942 for an overnight stop, then proceeded on 16 November to Dakar, which they reached without incident on 18 November 1942.

=== Free French Naval Forces ===
After the end of hostilities between French and Allied forces in French North Africa, Amazone and Antiope joined the Free French Naval Forces. They were reassigned to the 17th Submarine Division.

In 1943, Amazone was assigned to duty in support of the U.S. Navy sound school at Bermuda. Getting underway from Dakar, she made a stop at Bermuda from 26 to 28 February 1943, then proceeded to the Philadelphia Navy Yard on League Island in Philadelphia, Pennsylvania, where she underwent an overhaul.

After the completion of her overhaul, Amazone departed the Philadelphia Navy Yard on 14 October 1943 and made for Naval Submarine Base New London in Groton, Connecticut, arriving there on 16 October. She then headed for Bermuda, which she reached on 1 November 1943. Beginning her support to the sound school, she conducted exercises off Bermuda daily from 15 to 20 November, on 24 and 25 November, from 28 November to 1 December, on 3 and 4 December, from 6 to 9 December, from 20 to 25 December, and on 27 and 31 December 1943, and on 1, 5, 8, 10, 12, 13, 15, and 20 January, from 23 through 25 and from 27 through 29 January, from 1 to 3 February, and on 5 and 6 February 1944.

Amazone departed Bermuda on 12 February 1944 and headed for Key West, Florida, where she assumed duties with the U.S. Navy sound school there. She later proceeded to the Philadelphia Navy Yard for a refit. With it complete, she departed Philadelphia on 7 October 1944 and headed for Naval Base New London, which she reached on 8 October. She ran aground on 15 October 1944 inside Fort Pond Bay at Montauk, Long Island, New York. She was refloated on 16 October and towed to Naval Submarine Base New London. She departed Groton on 21 October 1944 under tow by the U.S. Navy rescue tug USS ATR-8 and arrived at the Philadelphia Navy Yard on 23 October 1944 for repairs. After the completion of her repairs, Amazone got underway from Philadelphia on 7 December 1944 and proceeded to Key West, where she arrived on 12 December 1944 and resumed her duties with the sound school.

World War II ended in Europe on 8 May 1945. Amazone departed Key West on 12 July 1945 bound for Bermuda. She got underway from Bermuda on 7 August 1945 and, after a stop at Ponta Delgada in the Azores, headed for Casablanca. While she was at sea, World War II ended with the surrender of Japan on 15 August 1945. She arrived at Casablanca on 19 August 1945.

== Final disposition ==
Amazone was stricken from the navy list and condemned on 26 April 1946.
