= Ariane-class submarine =

WWII French submarines

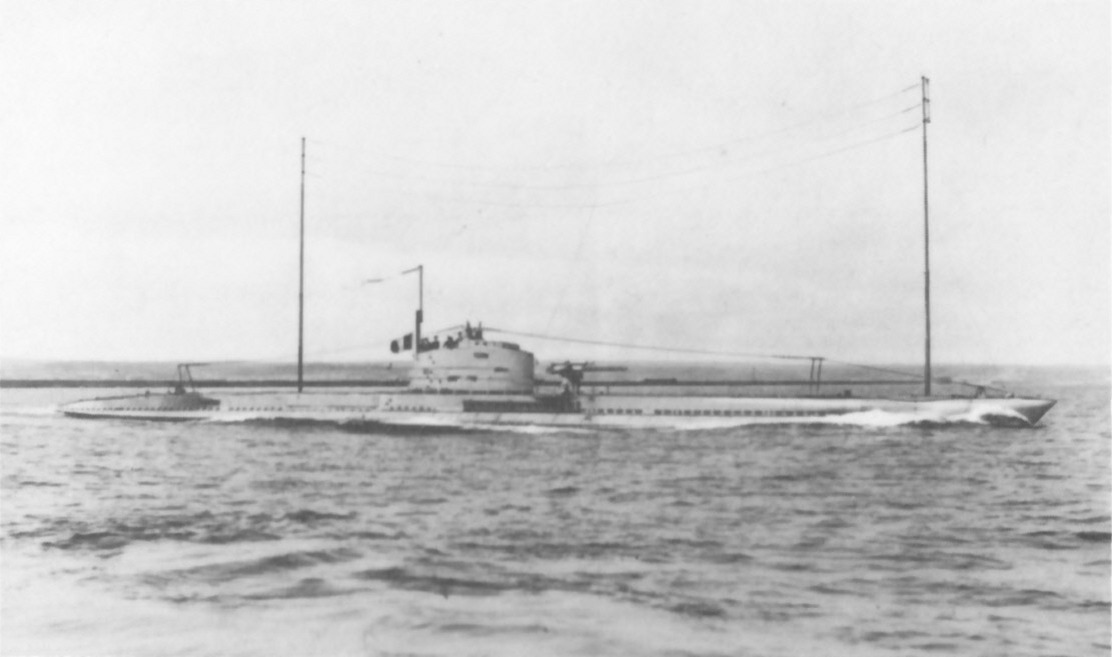
- Ariane in 1930

Class overview
- Builders: Chantiers et Ateliers Augustin Normand
- Operators: France
- In commission: 1925–1942
- Completed: 4
- Lost: 4

General characteristics
- Type: Submarine
- Displacement: 636 tonnes (626 tons) surfaced; 800 tonnes (787 tons) submerged
- Length: 64 m (210 ft 0 in)
- Beam: 6.2 m (20 ft 4 in)
- Draught: 4.1 m (13 ft 5 in)
- Speed: 14 knots (26 km/h; 16 mph) surface; 7.5 knots (13.9 km/h; 8.6 mph) submerged
- Complement: 41
- Armament: 1 x 75 mm (2.95 in) gun; 2 x 13.2 mm (0.52 in) AA gun; 7 x 21.7 in (550 mm) torpedo tubes (6 bow / 1 stern)

The Ariane class were a sub-class of the 600 series submarines, made by France in the interwar period. Most of them served during World War II, except for Ondine, which sank on its test trial due to collision in 1928.

== History ==
The Ariane class, or subclass, was built under the Normand-Fenaux type. They were considered the most successful of the 600 series submarines. It was made up of four submarines, Eurydice, Ariane (the lead ship), Danaé, and Ondine.

== Submarines ==
Ship	Builder	Laid down	Launched	Commissioned	Fate
Ondine	Chantiers et Ateliers Augustin Normand	8 February 1923	8 May or 5 August 1925	17 August 1928	Sunk in collision 3 October 1928
Ariane	Chantiers et Ateliers Augustin Normand	6 August 1923	6 August 1925	1 September 1929	Scuttled on 9 November 1942, at Oran.
Eurydice	Chantiers et Ateliers Augustin Normand	18 April 1924	31 May 1927	1 September 1929	Scuttled on 27 November 1942 to prevent her capture by the Germans.
Danaé	Chantiers et Ateliers Augustin Normand	18 April 1924	11 September 1927	November 1929	Scuttled on 9 November 1942, at Oran.

== See also ==
- List of submarines of France
