= HMT Haarlem =

History

United Kingdom
- Name: HMT Haarlem
- Builder: Cochrane & Sons Shipbuilders Ltd, Selby
- Launched: 20 November 1937
- Acquired: 1935
- Commissioned: July 1940
- Out of service: Returned to her owner in November 1945
- Fate: Scrapped in late 1960

General characteristics
- Class & type: Naval trawler
- Displacement: 431 tons
- Notes: Pennant number FY306

HMT Haarlem was a trawler, launched in late 1937. She was requisitioned by the Royal Navy during the Second World War and supported British efforts as an anti-submarine naval trawler.

Returned to her owners after the end of the war, she continued as a trawler until being scrapped in Hendrik Ido Ambacht, Netherlands.
