= Franco-Italian Armistice =

1940 armistice between France and Italy

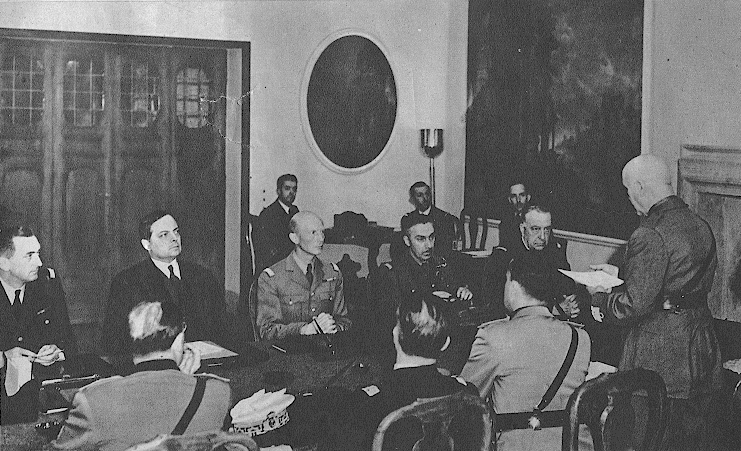
Badoglio reading the armistice conditions to the French delegation

The Franco-Italian Armistice, or Armistice of Villa Incisa, signed on 24 June 1940, in effect from 25 June, ended the brief Italian invasion of France during the Second World War.

On 10 June 1940, Italy declared war on France while the latter was already on the verge of defeat in its war with Germany. After the fall of Paris on 14 June, the French requested an armistice from Germany and, realising that the Germans would not allow them to continue the war against their Italian allies, also sent an armistice request to Italy, whose forces had not yet advanced. Fearing that the war would end before Italy had achieved any of its aims, Prime Minister Benito Mussolini ordered a full-scale invasion across the Alps to begin on 21 June. The Franco-German armistice was signed on the evening of the 22 June, but would not come into force until the Italians signed their own armistice. Their troops having advanced only a few kilometres, the Italians abandoned their major war aims and signed the armistice on 24 June. It came into effect early the next morning. It established a small occupation zone and an Italian Armistice Commission with France (Commissione Italiana d'Armistizio con la Francia, CIAF) in Turin to oversee French compliance. Armistice commissions were also established for French North Africa and French Somaliland. The armistice remained in force until November 1942, when during Case Anton the Italians occupied most of southeastern France and Corsica and invaded Tunisia.

== French request ==
On 17 June, the day after he transmitted a formal request for an armistice to the German government, French Foreign Minister Paul Baudoin handed to the Papal nuncio Valerio Valeri a note that said: "The French government, headed by Marshal Pétain, requests that the Holy See transmit to the Italian government as quickly as possible the note it has also transmitted through the Spanish ambassador to the German government. It also requests that he convey to the Italian government its desire to find together the basis of a lasting peace between the two countries." That same morning, Mussolini received word from Hitler that France had asked Germany for an armistice, and he went to meet Hitler at Munich, charging General Roatta, Admiral Raffaele de Courten and Air Brigadier Egisto Perino with drafting Italy's demands. Minister of Foreign Affairs Galeazzo Ciano wrote in his diary about the ridiculous demand some of his staff suggested: the entire French fleet, all its colonies, all its locomotives, the Mona Lisa. The final list of demands actually presented to the French were mild. Italy dropped its claims to the Rhône Valley, Corsica, Tunisia, and French Somaliland. According to Romain Rainero, Mussolini still clung to the goals laid out in his meeting with Hitler on 18 June as late as 21 June, when the "Protocols of the Armistice Conditions between France and Italy" were officially published in Rome. It was his view that it was not German pressure that led him to back down. Indeed, Hitler had wanted the Italians to claim even more territory from the defeated French. Pietro Badoglio, however, had warned Mussolini that a larger occupation of southern France would require fifteen divisions.

== Negotiations ==
On the evening of 21 June, Ambassador Dino Alfieri in Berlin transmitted the German armistice terms to Rome. According to Ciano, "under these [mild] conditions, Mussolini is not prepared to make territorial demands ... and [will] wait for the peace conference to make all our formal demands." He added that Mussolini wished to delay the meeting with the French in the hopes that General Gambara would take Nice. The French had tried to play the allies off against each other; they "flattered the Germans [and] belittled the Italian war effort". Unlike the Franco-German armistice talks, the Franco-Italian negotiations would be genuine.

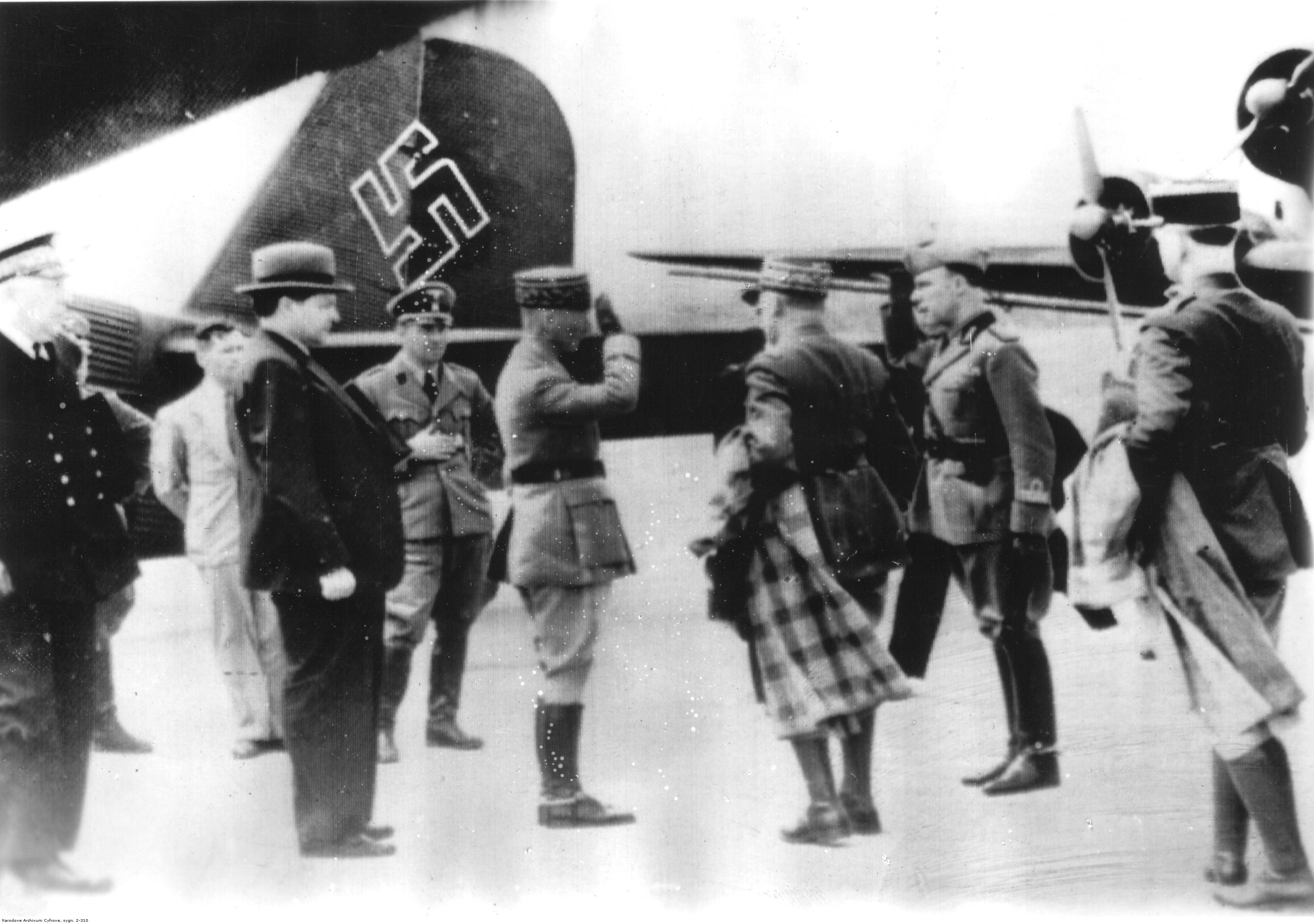
The French delegation arriving in Rome. Front row (L-R): Maurice Le Luc, Léon Noël, Charles Huntziger.

At 1500 hours on 23 June, the French delegation, headed by General Charles Huntziger, who had signed the German armistice the previous day, landed in Rome aboard three German aircraft. The French negotiators were the same who had met with the Germans: Huntziger, General Maurice Parisot, a peacetime friend of Badoglio's, General Jean Bergeret, Admiral Maurice Le Luc, Charles Rochat of the Foreign Ministry and Léon Noël, former ambassador to Poland. Italy was represented by Badoglio, Cavagnari, Ciano, Roatta and Francesco Pricolo. The first meeting of the two delegations took place at 1930 hours at the Villa Incisa all'Olgiata on the Via Cassia. It lasted only twenty-five minutes, during which Roatta read out Italy's proposed terms, Huntziger requested a recess to confer with his government and Ciano adjourned the meeting until the next day. During the adjournment, Hitler informed Mussolini that he thought the Italian demands too light, and he proposed linking up the German and Italian occupation zones. Roatta convinced Mussolini that it was too late to change the demands.

At 1915 hours on 24 June, at the Villa Incisa, after receiving his government's permission, General Huntziger signed the armistice on behalf of the French and Marshal Badoglio for the Italians signed the armistice. Both armistices came into effect at thirty-five minutes past midnight (0035 hours) (Note: Some authorities say 0135 hours, which is more consistent with the six-hour delay between signing and coming into force reported by Auphan and Mordal.) on 25 June. Just minutes before the signing, Huntziger had asked Badoglio to strike the clause calling for the repatriation to Italy of political refugees (like the socialist Pietro Nenni). Badoglio consulted Mussolini, he agreed. After signing, Huntziger said to Badoglio, "Marshal, in the present, infinitely painful circumstances, the French delegation is comforted by the sincere hope that the peace which will follow shortly will allow France to begin the task of reconstruction and renewal and will create the basis for lasting relations between our two countries in the interest of Europe and of civilization." Badoglio responded, "I hope France will have a resurgence; it is a great nation with a great history, and I am certain that it will have a great future. From one soldier to another, I sincerely hope so." Mussolini remarked that the agreement was "more a political than a military armistice after only fifteen days of war—but it gives us a good document in hand".

== Terms ==
Map of Vichy France after the armistices

The armistice established a modest demilitarised zone 50 km (31 mi) deep on the French side of the border, thus eliminating the Alpine Line. The actual Italian occupation zone was no more than what had been occupied up to the armistice. It contained 832 km^{2} (321 sq mi) and 28,500 inhabitants, which included the city of Menton and its 21,700 inhabitants. Italy retained the right to interfere in French territory as far as the Rhône, but it did not occupy this area until after the Allied invasion of French North Africa in November 1942. In addition, demilitarised zones were established in the French colonies in Africa. Italy was granted the right to use the port of Djibouti in French Somaliland with all its equipment, along with the French section of the Djibouti–Addis Ababa railway. More importantly, the naval bases of Toulon, Bizerte, Ajaccio and Oran were also to be demilitarised.

== Sources ==
- "The Franco-Italian Armistice". Bulletin of International News. 17 (14): 852–54. 13 July 1940.
- "Armistice Between France and Italy". The American Journal of International Law. 34 (4, Supplement: Official Documents): 178–83. October 1940. doi:10.2307/2213458. JSTOR 2213458. S2CID 246004883.
- Andreyev, N. (1941). "Italian Operations in the Alps". Military Review. 21 (80). Command and General Staff School: 57–60. Translated by Joseph Dasher. Originally published as Italyanskiye Operatsii v Alpakh (Итальянские Операции в Альпах) in Krasnaya Zvezda (6 October 1940).
- Armstrong, Hamilton Fish (1940). "The Downfall of France". Foreign Affairs. 19 (1): 55–144. doi:10.2307/20029051. JSTOR 20029051.
- Auphan, Gabriel Paul; Mordal, Jacques (1959). The French Navy in World War II. Annapolis, MD: United States Naval Institute.
- Corvaja, Santi (2001). Hitler and Mussolini: The Secret Meetings. New York: Enigma. Translation of Mussolini nella tana del lupo (Milan: Dall'Oglio, 1983) by Robert L. Miller.
- Knox, MacGregor (1999) [1982]. Mussolini Unleashed, 1939–1941: Politics and Strategy in Fascist Italy's Last War. Cambridge University Press. ISBN 978-0-521-33835-6.
- Merglen, Albert (1995). "Quelques réflexions historiques sur l'armistice franco-germano-italien de juin 1940". Guerres Mondiales et Conflits Contemporains. 177: 79–93.
- Rochat, Giorgio (2008). "La campagne italienne de juin 1940 dans les Alpes occidentales". Revue historique des armées. 250: 77–84, in 29 paragraphs online. doi:10.3917/rha.250.0077.
- Sica, Emanuele (2012). "June 1940: The Italian Army and the Battle of the Alps". Canadian Journal of History. 47 (2): 355–78. doi:10.3138/cjh.47.2.355.
