= Chantiers et Ateliers Augustin Normand =

French shipyard in Le Havre

Chantiers et Ateliers A. Normand was a French shipyard in Le Havre. It built torpedo boats and destroyers in the late 1800s and early 1900s for the French Navy.

They also developed the Normand boiler, an early design of the three-drum, water-tube boiler.

== Bibliography ==
- Jordan, John & Moulin, Jean (2015). French Destroyers: Torpilleurs d'Escadre & Contre-Torpilleurs, 1922-1956. Naval Institute Press. ISBN 978-1-61251-868-8.
