= List of shipwrecks in November 1942 =

The list of shipwrecks in November 1942 includes all ships sunk, foundered, grounded, or otherwise lost during November 1942.

== 1 November ==
List of shipwrecks: 1 November 1942
Ship	State	Description
Agnes	Finland	World War II: Continuation War: The cargo ship (2,983 GRT) was torpedoed and sunk in the Baltic Sea 12 nautical miles (22 km) north of Rixhöft, Germany by Shch-406 (Soviet Navy). Four of her crew were killed.
Biwa Maru	Japan	The cargo ship collided with Satsuma Maru (Imperial Japanese Army) and sank in the Karimata Strait.
Elmdale	United Kingdom	World War II: The cargo ship was torpedoed and sunk in the Atlantic Ocean (0°17′30″N 34°55′00″W) by U-174 ( Kriegsmarine) with the loss of six of her 42 crew. Survivors were rescued by Therezina M. ( Brazil). Elmdale was on a voyage from Baltimore, Maryland, United States to Alexandria, Egypt.
George Thatcher	United States	World War II: The Liberty ship was torpedoed and damaged in the Atlantic Ocean (1°50′S 8°00′E) by U-126 ( Kriegsmarine) with the loss of eighteen of the 66 people on board. Survivors were rescued by two Free French corvettes. George Thatcher was on her maiden voyage, she burned for two days and sank on 3 November.
Mendoza	United Kingdom	World War II: The troopship was torpedoed and sunk in the Indian Ocean (29°20′S 32°13′E) by U-178 ( Kriegsmarine) with the loss of 26 of the 408 people on board. Survivors were rescued by Cape Alava ( United States) and HMSAS Nigel (South African Navy).
Tripolino	Italy	World War II: The cargo ship was torpedoed and sunk in the Gulf of Bomba off the coast of Libya (32°21′N 23°24′E) by British aircraft. There was only one survivor.

== 2 November ==
List of shipwrecks: 2 November 1942
Ship	State	Description
Aegeus	Greece	World War II: The cargo ship (4,538 GRT) was torpedoed and sunk in the South Atlantic off Cape Columbine, Union of South Africa (32°30′S 16°00′E) by U-177 ( Kriegsmarine) with the loss of all 29 crew.
Brioni	Regia Marina	World War II: The armed merchant cruiser was bombed at Tobruk, Libya by American bombers and exploded. There were 33 dead and eighteen wounded.
Dalcroy	United Kingdom	World War II: Convoy SC 107: The cargo ship (4,558 GRT) was torpedoed and sunk in the Atlantic Ocean 500 nautical miles (930 km) east of Belle Isle, Dominion of Newfoundland (52°30′N 45°30′W) by U-402 ( Kriegsmarine). All 49 crew were rescued by Stockport ( United Kingdom).
Empire Antelope	United Kingdom	World War II: Convoy SC 107: The cargo ship (4,945 GRT) was torpedoed and sunk in the Atlantic Ocean (52°26′N 45°22′W) by U-402 ( Kriegsmarine). All 50 crew were rescued by Stockport ( United Kingdom).
Empire Gilbert	United Kingdom	World War II: The cargo ship was torpedoed and sunk in the Barents Sea (70°15′N 13°50′W) by U-586 ( Kriegsmarine) with the loss of 64 of her 67 crew. Survivors were rescued by U-586.
Empire Leopard	United Kingdom	World War II: Convoy SC 107: The cargo ship (5,676 GRT) straggled behind the convoy. She was torpedoed and sunk in the Atlantic Ocean (52°26′N 45°22′W) by U-402 ( Kriegsmarine) with the loss of 37 of her 41 crew. Survivors were rescued by Stockport ( United Kingdom).
Empire Sunrise	United Kingdom	World War II: Convoy SC 107: The cargo ship (7,459 GRT) torpedoed and damaged in the Atlantic Ocean by U-402 ( Kriegsmarine). She was again torpedoed and sunk the same day by U-84 ( Kriegsmarine). All 51 crew were rescued by Stockport ( United Kingdom).
Empire Zeal	United Kingdom	World War II: the cargo ship was torpedoed and sunk in the Atlantic Ocean (0°30′S 30°45′W) by Leonardo da Vinci (Regia Marina). Two of her crew were killed.
Gifu Maru	Imperial Japanese Army	Gifu Maru seen through the periscope of USS Seawolf World War II: The cargo ship was torpedoed and sunk in Davao Gulf by USS Seawolf ( United States Navy).
Hartington	United Kingdom	World War II: Convoy SC 107: The cargo ship (5,496 GRT) straggled behind the convoy in the Atlantic Ocean . She was torpedoed and damaged twice by U-438 and U-522 (both Kriegsmarine) with the loss of 24 of her 48 crew. Survivors were rescued by HMS Winchelsea (Royal Navy). Hartington was later torpedoed and sunk the same day at 52°30′N 45°30′W by U-521 ( Kriegsmarine).
Llandilo	United Kingdom	World War II: The cargo ship (4,966 GRT) was torpedoed and sunk in the South Atlantic south east of Saint Helena (27°03′S 2°59′W) by U-172 ( Kriegsmarine) with the loss of 24 of her 44 crew. Survivors were rescued by Olaf Bergh (Norway).
Maritima	United Kingdom	World War II: Convoy SC 107: The cargo ship (5,801 GRT) was torpedoed and sunk in the Atlantic Ocean 500 nautical miles (930 km) north east of St. John's, Dominion of Newfoundland (52°20′N 45°40′W) by U-522 ( Kriegsmarine) with the loss of 32 of her 59 crew. The 27 survivors were rescued by HMCS Arvida (Royal Canadian Navy).
Mount Pelion	Greece	World War II: Convoy SC 107: The cargo ship was (5,655 GRT) torpedoed and sunk in the Atlantic Ocean 500 nautical miles (930 km) north east of St. John's (52°20′N 45°40′W) by U-522 ( Kriegsmarine) with the loss of seven of her 39 crew.
Parthenon	Greece	World War II: Convoy SC 107: The cargo ship (3,189 GRT) was torpedoed and sunk in the Atlantic Ocean (53°30′N 42°15′W) by U-522 ( Kriegsmarine) with the loss of six of her 29 crew.
P.L.M. 27	Free France	World War II: The ore carrier (5,633 GRT) was torpedoed and sunk off Bell Island, Dominion of Newfoundland (47°36′N 52°58′W) by U-518 ( Kriegsmarine) with the loss of twelve of her 50 crew.
Rinos	Greece	World War II: Convoy SC 107: The cargo ship (4,649 GRT) was torpedoed and sunk in the Atlantic Ocean 500 nautical miles (930 km) east of Belle Isle (52°30′N 45°30′W) by U-402 ( Kriegsmarine) with the loss of five of her 31 crew.
Rose Castle	Canada	World War II: The ore carrier (7,083 GRT) (7,803 GRT) was torpedoed and sunk off Bell Island (47°36′N 52°58′W) by U-518 ( Kriegsmarine) with the loss of 24 of her 43 crew. Survivors were rescued by a Fairmile B motor launch (Royal Canadian Navy).
Yasukawa Maru	Imperial Japanese Army	World War II: The Yasukawa Maru-class anti-aircraft transport was bombed and damaged in Huon Bay, New Guinea by Boeing B-17 Flying Fortress aircraft of the United States 5th Air Force. She was kater scuttled by escorts in the Dampier Strait.
Zaandam	Netherlands	World War II: The passenger ship (10,909 GRT) was torpedoed and sunk in the Atlantic Ocean 300 nautical miles (560 km) north of Cape São Roque, Brazil (1°25′N 36°22′W) by U-174 ( Kriegsmarine) with the loss of 135 of the 299 people on board, including 5 who died of exposure after being rescued. Her passengers included survivors of sunk ships, and among the dead were 15 survivors of Chickasaw City, 8 of Firethorn, 6 of Coloradan and 21 of Examelia (all United States), and 17 of Swiftsure (Panama). Survivors were rescued by Gulfstate ( United States) and USS PC-576 ( United States Navy), or reached land in their lifeboats.
Zara	Regia Marina	World War II: The auxiliary cruiser was torpedoed and sunk in the Mediterranean Sea north of Tobruk by Bristol Beaufort aircraft of 39 Squadron, Royal Air Force. Three of her crew were killed.

== 3 November ==
List of shipwrecks: 3 November 1942
Ship	State	Description
HMS Baia	Royal Navy	The tug was lost while under tow in the Indian Ocean between Mombasa, Kenya and Mogadishu, Somaliland.
Chikugo Maru	Japan	World War II: The cargo ship was torpedoed and sunk in the Hainan Strait by USS Tambor ( United States Navy).
Chr. J. Kampmann	Canada	World War II: Convoy TAG 18: The cargo ship was torpedoed and sunk in the Caribbean Sea north west of Grenada (12°06′N 62°42′W) by U-160 ( Kriegsmarine) with the loss of nineteen of her 27 crew. Survivors were rescued by USS Lea ( United States Navy).
Dagomba	United Kingdom	World War II: The cargo ship was torpedoed and sunk by Ammiraglio Cagni (Regia Marina), about 500 nautical miles (930 km) southwest of Freetown, Sierra Leone (2°29′N 19°00′W). Of her complement of 56 crew, six gunners and one passenger, 23 were picked up by a French warship and interned, 21 including the captain were landed at Luanda by a Portuguese ship.
East Indian	United States	World War II: The cargo ship was torpedoed and sunk in the South Atlantic 300 nautical miles (560 km) south of the Cape of Good Hope, Union of South Africa (37°23′S 13°34′E) by U-181 ( Kriegsmarine) with the loss of six passengers and seventeen crew in the sinking. eighteen crew, eleven gunners and three passengers survive the sinking, but are never found. Two passengers, four gunners and thirteen crew were rescued by Durando ( United Kingdom) on 16 November.
Empire Lynx	United Kingdom	World War II: Convoy SC 107: The cargo ship was torpedoed and sunk in the Atlantic Ocean (55°20′N 40°01′W) by U-132 ( Kriegsmarine). Her 41 crew were rescued by Titus (Netherlands).
Gypsum Express	United Kingdom	World War II: Convoy TAG 18: The cargo ship was torpedoed and sunk in the Caribbean Sea west of Grenada (12°27′N 64°04′W) by U-160 ( Kriegsmarine). Her 40 crew were rescued by Gobeo (Spain).
Hahira	United States	World War II: Convoy SC 107: The tanker was torpedoed and sunk in the Atlantic Ocean 400 nautical miles (740 km) south west of Cape Farewell, Greenland (54°15′N 41°57′W) by U-521 ( Kriegsmarine) with the loss of three of her 56 crew. Survivors were rescued by Stockport ( United Kingdom).
Jeypore	United Kingdom	World War II: Convoy SC 107: The cargo ship was torpedoed and sunk in the Atlantic Ocean (55°30′N 40°16′W) by U-89 ( Kriegsmarine) with the loss of one of her 91 crew. Survivors were rescued by USS Pessacus and USS Uncas (both United States Navy).
Leda	Panama	World War II: Convoy TAG 18: The tanker was torpedoed and damaged in the Caribbean Sea west of Grenada (12°16′N 64°06′W) by U-160 ( Kriegsmarine). She was taken in tow but later foundered north west of Trinidad (11°12′N 62°18′W). Her 48 crew survived.
Porto Alegre	Brazil	World War II: The cargo ship was torpedoed and sunk in the Indian Ocean off Port Elizabeth, Union of South Africa (35°27′S 28°02′E) with the loss of one of the 52 people on board.
Sagami Mari	Japan	World War II: The cargo ship was torpedoed and sunk in Davao Gulf (7°02′N 125°33′E) by USS Seawolf ( United States Navy).
Tekkai Maru	Japan	World War II: The cargo ship was torpedoed and sunk in the Yellow Sea by USS Haddock ( United States Navy).
RFA Thorshavet	Royal Fleet Auxiliary	World War II: Convoy TAG 18: The tanker was torpedoed and damaged in the Caribbean Sea west of Grenada (12°16′N 64°06′W) by U-160 ( Kriegsmarine) with the loss of three of her 45 crew. She sank on 7 November. Survivors were rescued by one of the destroyers escorting the convoy.

== 4 November ==
List of shipwrecks: 4 November 1942
Ship	State	Description
Andreas	Greece	World War II: The cargo ship was torpedoed, shelled and sunk in the Atlantic Ocean (2°00′S 30°30′W) by Leonardo da Vinci (Regia Marina) with the loss of ten of her 47 crew.
Centauro	Regia Marina	World War II: The Spica-class torpedo boat (640 GRT) was sunk at Benghazi, Libya by British aircraft. Thirty-four of her crew were killed.
Daleby	United Kingdom	World War II: Convoy SC 107: The cargo ship was torpedoed and sunk in the Atlantic Ocean (57°24′N 35°54′W) by U-89 ( Kriegsmarine). Her 47 crew were rescued by Brúarfoss ( Iceland).
Hai Hing	Norway	World War II: The cargo ship was torpedoed and sunk in the Indian Ocean 7 nautical miles (13 km) off the Inhaca Lighthouse, Mozambique (25°55′S 33°10′E) by U-178 ( Kriegsmarine) with the loss of 25 of her 67 crew. Survivors were rescued by Chaimite (Portugal).
Hatimura	United Kingdom	World War II: Convoy SC 107: The cargo ship was torpedoed and damaged in the Atlantic Ocean 500 nautical miles (930 km) south east of Cape Farewell, Greenland by U-132 ( Kriegsmarine). She then straggled behind the convoy and was torpedoed and sunk at 55°28′N 39°52′W by U-442 ( Kriegsmarine) with the loss of four of her 90 crew. The explosion of the ship sunk U-132 with the loss of all hands. Survivors were rescued by USS Pessacus and USS Uncas (both United States Navy).
Hobbema	Netherlands	World War II: Convoy SC 107: The cargo ship was torpedoed and sunk in the Atlantic Ocean (55°18′N 40°00′W) by U-132 ( Kriegsmarine) with the loss of 28 of her 44 crew. Survivors were rescued by USS Pessacus and USS Uncas (both United States Navy).
Maurice R. Shaw, Jr.	United States	The barge foundered 4 nautical miles (7.4 km) off the Jupiter Point Lighthouse, Florida.
Oued Grou	United Kingdom	World War II: The coaster was torpedoed and sunk in the Gulf of Guinea (4°53′N 4°49′E) by U-126 ( Kriegsmarine) with the loss of five of her 39 crew.
Ro-65	Imperial Japanese Navy	World War II: The Type L4 submarine sank in Kiska Harbor, Alaska Territory (51°58′N 171°33′E), in a diving incident during an air raid when a hatch was left open. Nineteen of her crew were killed, 45 crew and her commanding officer were able to escape.
Trekieve	United Kingdom	World War II: The cargo ship was torpedoed and sunk in the Mozambique Channel east of Lourenço Marques, Portuguese East Africa (25°46′S 33°48′E) by U-178 ( Kriegsmarine) with the loss of three of her 50 crew.
U-132	Kriegsmarine	World War II: The Type VIIC submarine was sunk in the Atlantic Ocean (55°28′N 39°52′W) by the explosion of Hatimura ( United Kingdom), which had been torpedoed and sunk by U-442 ( Kriegsmarine). Her 47 crew were killed.
William Clark	United States	World War II: The Liberty ship (7,076 GRT) was torpedoed and sunk in the Greenland Sea (71°05′N 13°10′W) by U-354 ( Kriegsmarine). Five crew were killed during the sinking and of the 66 survivors 23 were lost about the motorboat that was never seen after sailing for Island and 2 others died of exposure, before the 41 survivors were rescued by HMT Cape Palliser and HMT St Elstan (both Royal Navy) on 7 November. One more man died after the rescue, bring the death toll to 31.

== 5 November ==
List of shipwrecks: 5 November 1942
Ship	State	Description
Astrell	Norway	World War II: Convoy TAG 18: The tanker (7,595 GRT) was torpedoed and sunk in the Atlantic Ocean (12°21′N 69°21′W) by U-129 ( Kriegsmarine) with the loss of one of her 43 crew. Survivors were rescued by HNLMS TM-23, HNLMS Van Kinsbergen (both Royal Netherlands Navy) and USCGC CG-475 ( United States Coast Guard).
Chulmleigh	United Kingdom	World War II: The cargo ship was bombed and damaged in the Greenland Sea by Junkers Ju 88 aircraft of II Gruppe, KG 30, Luftwaffe. She was beached at Sørkapp, Spitzbergen but was torpedoed, shelled and sunk the next day by U-625 ( Kriegsmarine) with the loss of 45 of her 58 crew.
Dekabrist	Soviet Union	World War II: The cargo ship was torpedoed and damaged by Junkers Ju 88 aircraft in the Greenland Sea near Hope Island (75°30′N 27°10′E) east of Spitzbergen Island and abandoned. She was torpedoed and sunk early the next morning by Junker Ju 88 aircraft of the Luftwaffe. Seventy-seven of her crew died in the sinking or the ordeal afterwards. Two of her crew and the ship's female doctor rescued from Hope Island by U-703 ( Kriegsmarine) on 7 October 1943.
La Cordillera	United Kingdom	World War II: The cargo ship (5,185 GRT) was torpedoed and sunk in the Atlantic Ocean 85 nautical miles (157 km) east of Barbados (12°02′N 58°04′W) by U-163 ( Kriegsmarine) with the loss of three of her 41 crew. 18 survivors landed at Port of Sapin. The other half landed at Carlisle Bay, Barbados. La Cordillera was on a voyage from Suez, Egypt to New York, United States.
Meton	United States	World War II: Convoy TAG 18: The tanker (7,027 GRT) was torpedoed and sunk in the Atlantic Ocean 100 nautical miles (190 km) north of Curaçao, Curaçao and Dependencies (12°21′N 69°21′W) by U-129 ( Kriegsmarine) with the loss of one of her 50 crew. Survivors were rescued by HNLMS TM-23 (Royal Netherlands Navy).
New Toronto	United Kingdom	World War II: The cargo ship (6,568 GRT) was torpedoed and sunk in the Gulf of Guinea (5°57′N 2°30′E) by U-126 ( Kriegsmarine) with the loss of four of her 106 crew and passengers. Survivors were rescued by HMML 263 (Royal Navy).
Shch-305	Soviet Navy	World War II: The Shchuka-class submarine was rammed and sunk in the Baltic Sea (60°03′N 19°12′E) by Vetehinen (Finnish Navy) with the loss of all 39 crew.
U-408	Kriegsmarine	World War II: The Type VIIC submarine was depth charged and sunk in the Atlantic Ocean north of Iceland (67°40′N 18°32′W) by a Consolidated PBY Catalina aircraft of the United States Navy with the loss of all 45 crew.

== 6 November ==
For the foundering of the British cargo ship Silverwillow on this day, see the entry for 30 October 1942

List of shipwrecks: 6 November 1942
Ship	State	Description
Antonio Sciesa	Regia Marina	World War II: The Balilla-class submarine was bombed and severely damaged at Tobruk, Libya by American aircraft. Of the 55 crewmen aboard, 23 were killed and fourteen were wounded. She was scuttled on 12 November.
Arica	United Kingdom	World War II: Convoy TRIN 24: The cargo ship (5,431 GRT) was torpedoed and sunk in the Caribbean Sea 8 nautical miles (15 km) north of Galeta Point, Trinidad (10°58′N 60°52′W) by U-160 ( Kriegsmarine) with the loss of twelve of her 67 crew. Survivors were rescued by HMT Lady Elsa (Royal Navy).
City of Cairo	United Kingdom	World War II: The passenger ship (8,034 GRT) was torpedoed and sunk in the Atlantic Ocean 480 nautical miles (890 km) south of Saint Helena (23°30′S 5°30′W) by U-68 ( Kriegsmarine). Only six people were lost in the sinking but 96 more were lost at sea, to exposure or in boats vanising without trace. 155 survivors were rescued by Clan Alpine and 47 by Bendoran, (both United Kingdom), 2 by Caravelas (Brazilian Navy) and 3 by Rhakotis (Germany). One of the latter died aboard the German ship, while one officer rescued by the Brazulian was lost while being repatriated when City of Pretoria was sunk in March 1943, bringing the total death toll to 104 (79 crew members, three gunners and 22 passengers).
Elbing IX	Germany	World War II: The cargo ship was torpedoed and sunk in the Baltic Sea. There were four dead and seven survivors. Her attacker may have been Shch-306 (Soviet Navy) but she was more likely to have been sunk by a mine.
Empire Sky	United Kingdom	World War II: The cargo ship (7,455 GRT) was torpedoed and sunk in the Barents Sea 20 nautical miles (37 km) south of Spitzbergen, Norway (76°20′N 17°30′E) by U-625 ( Kriegsmarine) with the loss of all 60 crew.
Etiopia	Regia Marina	World War II: The cargo ship was bombed and burnt out in an Allied air raid on Tobruk. She was subsequently scrapped.
HMS LCP(L) 209	Royal Navy	The Landing Craft, Personnel (Large) was lost on this date.
Lidingo	Sweden	World War II: The ore carrier struck a mine and sank in the Fehmarn Belt (54°32′54″N 11°19′05″E). Her crew survived.
HMS MGB 19	Royal Navy	World War II: The BPB 70'-class motor gun boat was bombed and sunk by Luftwaffe aircraft at Oulton Bank, England.
Ocean Justice	United Kingdom	The Ocean ship was torpedoed and sunk in the Atlantic Ocean (10°06′N 60°00′W by U-505 (Kriegsmarine).
Portofino	Italy	World War II: The tanker was bombed and sunk at Benghazi, Libya during a British air raid.
Selve	Regia Marina	World War II: The Galeb-class minelayer was bombed and sunk by British aircraft at Benghazi. Twenty-two of her crew were killed. Her wreck was scrapped in 1948.

== 7 November ==
List of shipwrecks: 7 November 1942
Ship	State	Description
Donbass	Soviet Union	World War II: The tanker was sunk in the Barents Sea (76°24′N 41°30′E) with gunfire from Z27 ( Kriegsmarine). Forty-nine of her 65 crew were killed. The 16 survivors were rescued by Z27 and made prisoners of war.
Elsa Essberger	Germany	World War II: The cargo ship was bombed and severely damaged at Bordeaux, Gironde, France during an Allied air raid. She was declared a total loss.
Eveleen	United Kingdom	The coaster collided with Orchy ( United Kingdom) in Belfast Lough and sank. She was raised in November 1943, repaired and returned to service as Empire Eveleen.
Gladys Moller	United Kingdom	The cargo ship ran aground on the Baker Rocks, 60 nautical miles (110 km) south of Trincomalee, Ceylon. She was abandoned as a total loss on 11 November.
Glenlea	United Kingdom	World War II: Convoy ON 142: The cargo ship straggled behind the convoy. She was torpedoed and sunk in the Atlantic Ocean north of the Azores, Portugal (approximately 50°N 30°W) by U-566 ( Kriegsmarine) with the loss of 44 of her 49 crew. Her captain was taken on board U-566 as a prisoner of war. The other survivors were rescued by Thorstrand (Norway).
Ha-11	Imperial Japanese Navy	World War II: The midget submarine ran aground in shallow water off Marovovo Island, Solomon Islands, and was scuttled. Her two crew made it to shore, the first Japanese midget submarine crew to survive a mission.
La Salle	United States	World War II: The cargo ship was torpedoed, causing her cargo of ammunition to explode, sinking her with the loss of all 60 crew in the South Atlantic 350 nautical miles (650 km) south east of the Cape of Good Hope, South Africa (40°00′S 21°30′E) by U-159 ( Kriegsmarine).
Lindenhall	United Kingdom	World War II: Convoy TAG 19: The cargo ship was torpedoed and sunk in the Caribbean Sea 40 nautical miles (74 km) north of Margarita Island, Venezuela (11°34′N 63°26′W) by U-508 ( Kriegsmarine) with the loss of 42 of her 48 crew. Survivors were rescued by USS Surprise ( United States Navy).
USS Majaba	United States Navy	World War II: The cargo ship was torpedoed 2 nautical miles (3.7 km) east of Lunga Point, Guadalcanal by Ha-11 ( Imperial Japanese Navy) and beached near the mouth of the Tenaru River, Guadalcanal, Solomon Islands. She was later refloated and repaired as a non-self propelled auxiliary.
Nathaniel Hawthorne	United States	World War II: Convoy TAG 19: The Liberty ship was torpedoed and sunk in the Caribbean Sea 40 nautical miles (74 km) north of Margarita Island (11°34′N 63°26′W) by U-508 ( Kriegsmarine) with the loss of a passenger, seven gunners and 30 of her crew. Survivors, a passenger, three gunners, and ten of her crew, were rescued on 9 November by USS Biddle ( United States Navy).
Ocean Justice	United Kingdom	World War II: The Ocean ship was torpedoed and sunk in the Atlantic Ocean east of Trinidad (10°06′N 60°00′W) by U-505 ( Kriegsmarine). All 56 people on board, including two survivors from Belgian Fighter (Belgium) were rescued by Royal Navy motor torpedo boats.
Roxby	United Kingdom	World War II: Convoy ON 142: The cargo ship straggled behind the convoy. She was torpedoed and sunk in the Atlantic Ocean (49°35′N 30°32′W) by U-613 ( Kriegsmarine) with the loss of 33 of her 46 crew. Survivors were rescued by Irish Beech (Ireland).
SKR-23	Soviet Navy	World War II: The auxiliary guard boat was sunk with gunfire by Z27 ( Kriegsmarine) in the Barents Sea. Sixteen of her 43 crew were killed or died of wounds, the survivors were captured.
USS Thomas Stone	United States Navy	World War II: The President Jackson-class attack transport was torpedoed and damaged in the Mediterranean Sea 150 nautical miles (280 km) off Algiers, Algeria by U-205 ( Kriegsmarine). She was towed to Algiers, where she was bombed and damaged on 25 November, then driven aground in a storm. Salvage was abandoned on 1 April 1944 and she declared a constructive total loss. The wreck was broken up in situ in 1947.

== 8 November ==
List of shipwrecks: 8 November 1942
Ship	State	Description
Actéon	(France) Vichy French Navy	World War II: Operation Torch: Naval Battle of Oran: The Redoutable-class submarine was depth charged and sunk off Oran, Algeria by HMS Westcott (Royal Navy) with the loss of all 65 crew.
Albatros	(France) Vichy French Navy	World War II: Naval Battle of Casablanca: The Aigle-class destroyer was shelled off Casablanca, Morocco by USS Augusta, USS Wichita, and USS Tuscaloosa (all United States Navy), then bombed by aircraft from USS Suwanee ( United States Navy). Albatros was beached to prevent sinking. She was repaired and returned to service post-war.
Amphitrite	(France) Vichy French Navy	World War II: Naval Battle of Casablanca: The Diane-class submarine was bombed, shelled and sunk at Casablanca (33°06′30″N 07°36′58″W) by Allied ships and aircraft. A crew member was killed and two died of wounds.
Argonaute	(France) Vichy French Navy	World War II: Operation Torch: The Argonaute-class submarine was depth charged and sunk in the Mediterranean Sea off Oran, Algeria, by either the destroyer HMS Achates (Royal Navy), the destroyer HMS Westcott (Royal Navy), or both, with the loss of all 43 crew.
Brestois	(France) Vichy French Navy	World War II: Naval Battle of Casablanca: The L'Adroit-class destroyer was shelled and sunk off Casablanca by USS Brooklyn. Seven of her crew were killed.
HMS Broke	Royal Navy	World War II: Operation Terminal: The Shakespeare-class destroyer was shelled and damaged in the Mediterranean Sea off Algiers, Algeria. She sank under tow on 10 November.
Boulonnais	(France) Vichy French Navy	World War II: Naval Battle of Casablanca: The L'Adroit-class destroyer was shelled and sunk off Casablanca by USS Augusta ( United States Navy). Twelve of her crew were killed.
Capo Olmo	United Kingdom	World War II: The cargo ship was torpedoed and damaged in the Atlantic Ocean (10°56′N 61°14′W) by U-67 ( Kriegsmarine). She was beached at Port of Spain, Trinidad. Capo Olmo was refloated in June 1943, arriving at Baltimore, Maryland, United States for repairs on 18 August. She was returned to service in December 1943.
Chene	(France) Vichy French Navy	World War II: Naval Battle of Oran: The Crabe-class patrol tug was scuttled at Oran.
D'Entrecasteaux	United Kingdom	World War II: The cargo ship was torpedoed and sunk in the Atlantic Ocean 150 nautical miles (280 km) east of Barbados (15°30′N 57°00′W) by U-154 ( Kriegsmarine) with the loss of three of her 66 crew.
Dubourdieu	(France) Vichy French Navy	World War II: Naval Battle of Casablanca: The decommissioned Dubourdieu-class gunboat was sunk by American forces at Casablanca.
Fougueux	(France) Vichy French Navy	World War II: Naval Battle of Casablanca: The L'Adroit-class destroyer was shelled and sunk off Casablanca.
Frondeur	(France) Vichy French Navy	World War II: Naval Battle of Casablanca: The L'Adroit-class destroyer was shelled and sunk off Casablanca.
HMS Hartland	Royal Navy	World War II: Naval Battle of Oran: The Banff-class sloop was shelled and sunk in the Mediterranean sea off Oran by Typhon ( (France) Vichy French Navy) and shore-based artillery.
Ile De Edienruder	Vichy France	World War II: Naval Battle of Casablanca: The ocean liner was shelled and sunk in Casablanca Harbour by USS Massachusetts ( United States Navy).
Ile D'Ouessant	Vichy France	World War II: Naval Battle of Casablanca: The tanker was shelled and sunk in Casablanca Harbour by USS Massachusetts ( United States Navy).
Keiko Maru	Imperial Japanese Navy	World War II: The auxiliary gunboat was torpedoed and sunk in Davao Gulf off Cape San Augustin, Mindanao, Philippines (06°22′N 126°53′E) by USS Seawolf ( United States Navy).
USS Leedstown	United States Navy	World War II: Operation Torch: The troopship was torpedoed, bombed and damaged in the Mediterranean Sea 3 nautical miles (5.6 km) off Cape Matifon, Algeria by Junkers Ju 88 aircraft of III Staffeln, Kampfgeschwader 26, Luftwaffe and was immobilised. She was torpedoed and sunk the next day by U-331 ( Kriegsmarine) with the loss of 59 of the 163 people on board.
Lilias	(France) Vichy French Navy	The auxiliary minesweeper was lost on this date.
Lipari	Vichy France	World War II: Naval Battle of Casablanca: The cargo liner was shelled and sunk in Casablanca Harbour by USS Massachusetts ( United States Navy).
Lorrain	France	World War II: The cargo ship was scuttled at Oran.
Maloja	Norway	World War II: The cargo ship was torpedoed, shelled and sunk in the Atlantic Ocean (11°58′N 27°08′W) by U-128 ( Kriegsmarine) with the loss of two of her 41 crew. Survivors were rescued by Egyptian Prince ( United Kingdom).
Milan	(France) Vichy French Navy	World War II: Naval Battle of Casablanca: The Aigle-class destroyer was bombed, shelled and beached off Casablanca.
Mitidja	France	World War II: The cargo ship was bombed and sunk in an Allied air raid on Oran.
Moron	France	World War II: The cargo ship was scuttled at Bizerte, Algeria.
Oréade	(France) Vichy French Navy	World War II: Naval Battle of Casablanca: The Diane-class submarine was bombed by aircraft from USS Ranger and USS Suwanee (both United States Navy) in the harbor at Casablanca. She capsized and sank with four dead, her commanding officer mortally wounded, and five others injured.
P-13 Victoria	(France) Vichy French Navy	World War II: Operation Torch: The auxiliary patrol vessel was sunk off the coast of Morocco by Royal Navy ships.
Plaudit	Panama	World War II: The cargo ship was torpedoed and sunk in the Indian Ocean off Port Elizabeth, Union of South Africa (36°00′S 26°32′E) by U-181 ( Kriegsmarine) with the loss of three of her 46 crew. Survivors were rescued by HMSAS Africana (South African Navy).
Porthos	Vichy France	World War II: Naval Battle of Casablanca: The ocean liner was shelled and sunk in Casablanca Harbour by USS Massachusetts ( United States Navy). She was refloated on 7 June 1945 and subsequently scrapped.
Primauguet	(France) Vichy French Navy	World War II: Naval Battle of Casablanca: The Duguay-Trouin-class cruiser was shelled and sunk at Casablanca by USS Massachusetts and USS Wichita (both United States Navy) with the loss of 45 of her 578 crew.
La Psyché	(France) Vichy French Navy	World War II: Naval Battle of Casablanca: The Diane-class submarine was sunk in the harbor at Casablanca (33°06′30″N 007°36′58″W) by SBD Dauntless aircraft of the United States Navy with the loss of eleven killed and many wounded. She was refloated in 1944 but was not repaired.
Roubaisien	France	World War II: The cargo ship was scuttled by the French Navy at Bizerte. She was refloated in December 1947 and scrapped in 1950.
Saint Blaize	Vichy France	World War II: Naval Battle of Casablanca: The tanker was bombed and damaged in Casablanca Harbour by American aircraft. Salvage was abandoned on 18 December 1945. She was broken up in situ in 1951.
Saint Pierre	Vichy France	World War II: The cargo ship was scuttled at Casablanca. She was subsequently scrapped.
Savoie	Vichy France	World War II: Naval Battle of Casablanca: The ocean liner was shelled and sunk in Casablanca Harbour by USS Massachusetts ( United States Navy). She was later refloated, beached and scrapped.
Sentinelle	Vichy France	World War II: Naval Battle of Casablanca: The fishing trawler was shelled and sunk in Casablanca Harbour.
St. Hugues	Vichy France	World War II: The cargo ship was scuttled as a blockship at Port-Lyautey, Morocco.
Surprise	(France) Vichy French Navy	World War II: Naval Battle of Casablanca: The Chamois-class minesweeper was shelled and sunk off Oran by HMS Brilliant (Royal Navy).
Tornade	(France) Vichy French Navy	World War II: Naval Battle of Oran: The Bourrasque-class destroyer was shelled off Oran by HMS Aurora and HMS Calpe (Royal Navy) and was beached.
Tramontane	(France) Vichy French Navy	World War II: Naval Battle of Oran: The Bourrasque-class destroyer was shelled off Oran by HMS Aurora and HMS Calpe (Royal Navy) and was beached.
Ville du Havre	(France) Vichy French Navy	World War II: Naval Battle of Casablanca: The cargo ship was torpedoed and sunk in the Atlantic Ocean off Casablanca (33°34′N 7°52′W) by USS Herring (United States Navy).
HMS Walney	Royal Navy	HMS Walney World War II: Naval Battle of Oran: The Banff-class sloop was shelled and sunk at Oran by Surprise ( (France) Vichy French Navy) with only fourteen survivors of 281 people on board.
West Humhaw	United States	World War II: Convoy ST 40: The Design 1013 ship was torpedoed and sunk in the Atlantic Ocean 60 nautical miles (110 km) south of Takoradi, Gold Coast (4°19′N 2°44′W) by U-161 ( Kriegsmarine). All 59 crew were rescued by HMML-281 (Royal Navy).

== 9 November ==
List of shipwrecks: 9 November 1942
Ship	State	Description
Ariane	(France) Vichy French Navy	World War II: Operation Torch: The disarmed Ariane-class submarine was scuttled at Oran, Algeria .
Cambraisien	(France) Vichy French Navy	The cargo ship was wrecked. She was on a voyage from Sfax, Tunisia, to Marseille, Bouches-du-Rhône.
Carl Zeiss	Kriegsmarine	World War II: The training ship struck a mine and sank in the Baltic Sea. She was refloated in 1944.
HMS Cromer	Royal Navy	World War II: The Bangor-class minesweeper struck a mine in a barrage laid by Antonio Pigafetta (Regia Marina) and Giovanni da Verrazzano (Regia Marina) and sank in the Mediterranean Sea off Mersa Matruh, Egypt (31°26′N 27°16′E) with the loss of 46 of her 60 crew.
Dahomey	Free France	World War II: Operation Torch: The cargo ship ran aground off Bouznika, Morocco during Allied landings. She was set afire and burnt out, a total loss.
Danaé	(France) Vichy French Navy	World War II: Operation Torch: The disarmed Ariane-class submarine was scuttled at Oran.
Diane	(France) Vichy French Navy	World War II: Operation Torch: The disarmed Diane-class submarine was scuttled at Oran.
Divona	France	World War II: Operation Torch: The cargo ship was scuttled at Bizerta, Algeria by Vichy French forces. She was refloated in October 1946 and scrapped.
Épervier	(France) Vichy French Navy	World War II: Naval Battle of Oran: The Aigle-class destroyer was shelled and damaged by HMS Aurora (Royal Navy) and was then beached off Oran.
Fidelio	Norway	World War II: Convoy FN 861: The cargo ship was torpedoed and sunk in the North Sea by S-46 and S-83 (both Kriegsmarine) with the loss of seven of her 27 crew.
HMS Gardenia	Royal Navy	World War II: Operation Torch: The Flower-class corvette collided with HMT Fluellen (Royal Navy) in the Mediterranean Sea off Oran with the loss of three crew.
Granito	Regia Marina	World War II: The Acciaio-class submarine was torpedoed and sunk in the Mediterranean Sea near San Vito Siculo (38°34′N 12°09′E) by HMS Saracen (Royal Navy) with the loss of all 47 crew.
La Bonoise	(France) Vichy French Navy	World War II: Naval Battle of Oran: The naval trawler was scuttled at Oran.
L'Ajaccienne	(France) Vichy French Navy	World War II: Naval Battle of Oran: The naval trawler was scuttled at Oran. She was later raised, repaired and returned to service.
La Setoise	(France) Vichy French Navy	World War II: Naval Battle of Oran: The naval trawler was scuttled at Oran. She was later raised, repaired and returned to service.
La Toulonnaise	(France) Vichy French Navy	World War II: Naval Battle of Oran: The naval trawler was scuttled at Oran. She was later raised, repaired and returned to service.
Margot	Germany	World War II: The tanker was bombed and sunk at Nantes, Loire-Inférieure, France during an Allied air raid.
Nidarland	Norway	World War II: The cargo ship was torpedoed and sunk in the Atlantic Ocean (11°41′N 60°42′W) by U-67 ( Kriegsmarine) with the loss of one of her 35 crew.
Nurmahal	United Kingdom	World War II: The cargo ship was torpedoed and sunk in the Atlantic Ocean 300 nautical miles (560 km) east of Martinique (14°45′N 55°45′W) by U-154 ( Kriegsmarine) with the loss of all 88 crew.
Ostland	Germany	World War II: The cargo ship was wrecked in the Baltic Sea off the coast of Sweden, between Arköbådan and Hävringe.
Spahi	France	World War II: Operation Torch: The cargo ship was scuttled at Oran. She was scrapped in Savona, Italy, in August 1950.
Pigeon	(France) Vichy French Navy	The minesweeping tug was lost on this date.
Tourterelle	(France) Vichy French Navy	World War II: Naval Battle of Oran: The Pluvier-class tug was scuttled at Oran.
Typhon	(France) Vichy French Navy	World War II: Naval Battle of Oran: The Bourrasque-class destroyer was scuttled at Oran.
V 88	(France) Vichy French Navy	The SC-1-class submarine chaser was lost on this date.
Wolfram	Germany	World War II: The cargo ship struck a mine in the North Sea off Vlieland, Friesland, Netherlands. She sank the next day. Vp 806 ( Kriegsmarine) recovered the survivors and 1 body.

== 10 November ==
List of shipwrecks: 10 November 1942
Ship	State	Description
Cerinthus	United Kingdom	World War II: The cargo ship was torpedoed and sunk in the Atlantic Ocean 180 nautical miles (330 km; 210 mi) south west of the Cape Verde Islands, Portugal (12°27′N 27°45′W) by U-128 ( Kriegsmarine) with the loss of twenty of her 40 crew. Survivors were rescued by HMS Bridgewater (Royal Navy) and Kentuckian ( United States).
Angelo Emo	Regia Marina	World War II: The Marcello-class submarine was depth charged, forced to the surface, shelled and damaged, and then scuttled to prevent capture in the Mediterranean Sea near Algiers, Algeria (36°50′N 02°50′E) by HMT Lord Nuffield (Royal Navy). Thirteen of her 62 crew were killed. Survivors were captured by HMT Lord Nuffield.
Garlinge	United Kingdom	World War II: The cargo ship was torpedoed and sunk in the Mediterranean Sea 21 nautical miles (39 km) north of Cape Ivi, Algeria by U-81 ( Kriegsmarine) with the loss of 25 of her 49 crew. Survivors were rescued by HMS Minna (Royal Navy).
Ghambria	United Kingdom	World War II: The Admiralty-requisitioned cargo ship was scuttled in Kirk Sound, Scapa Flow as a blockship. She was salvaged in 1943.
I-15	Imperial Japanese Navy	World War II: The Type B1 submarine was depth charged, shelled and sunk the Solomon Sea at the southern end of Indispensable Sound, off the north west tip of San Cristobal Island, Solomon Islands (10°13′S 161°09′E) by USS Southard ( United States Navy) with a loss of all 91 crew.
HMS Ibis	Royal Navy	World War II: The Black Swan-class sloop was sunk in the Mediterranean Sea near Algiers by a Junkers Ju 88 aircraft of the Luftwaffe.
Jean Bart	(France) Vichy French Navy	World War II: Naval Battle of Casablanca: The incomplete Richelieu-class battleship was bombed and sunk at Casablanca, Morocco by aircraft based on USS Ranger ( United States Navy). She was raised in 1944 and completed in 1952.
K. G. Meldahl	Norway	World War II: The cargo ship was torpedoed and sunk in the Indian Ocean off East London, Union of South Africa (34°59′S 29°46′E) by U-181 ( Kriegsmarine) with the loss of two of her 33 crew. Survivors were rescued by a South African Navy minesweeper.
Marcus Whitman	United States	World War II: The Liberty ship was torpedoed, shelled and sunk in the Atlantic Ocean (5°40′S 32°11′W) by Leonardo da Vinci (Regia Marina).
HMS Martin	Royal Navy	World War II: Operation Torch: The M-class destroyer was torpedoed and sunk in the Mediterranean Sea off Algeria (37°53′N 3°57′E) by U-431 ( Kriegsmarine) with the loss of 158 of her 221 crew. Survivors were rescued by HMS Quentin (Royal Navy).
Méduse	(France) Vichy French Navy	World War II: The Diane-class submarine was bombed and sunk in the Atlantic Ocean off Cap Blanc, Morocco by aircraft based on USS Philadelphia ( United States Navy).
Sendai Maru	Imperial Japanese Navy	World War II: The Minoo Maru-class naval trawler/auxiliary storeship was torpedoed, broke in two, and exploded in the Pacific Ocean 38 nautical miles (70 km; 44 mi) west south west Nishi Shima (Pianu (Torres) atoll), Truk, Marshall Islands (7°12′N 150°47′E) by USS Grayling ( United States Navy). She sank with the loss of all ten crew.
Start Point	United Kingdom	World War II: The cargo ship was torpedoed and sunk in the Atlantic Ocean south west of the Cape Verde Islands (13°12′N 27°27′W) by U-128 ( Kriegsmarine) with the loss of two of her 47 crew. Two of her crew were taken on board U-128 as prisoners of war, other survivors were rescued by Eskdalegate ( United Kingdom).

== 11 November ==
List of shipwrecks: 11 November 1942
Ship	State	Description
HMT Awatea	Royal Navy	World War II: The troopship was bombed and sunk in the Mediterranean Sea off Bougie, Algeria by Luftwaffe aircraft. There were no dead and four wounded.
Benghazi	Kriegsmarine	World War II: The submarine depot ship was torpedoed and sunk in the Mediterranean Sea south of Cagliari, Sardinia, Italy (39°10′N 9°39′E) by HMS Turbulent (Royal Navy). Three of her crew were killed; 78 survivors (including five wounded) were rescued.
HMS Cathay	Royal Navy	World War II: The armed merchant cruiser was bombed and sunk in the Mediterranean Sea off Bougie (36°44′35″N 5°06′41″E) with the loss of one life.
City of Ripon	United Kingdom	World War II: The cargo ship was torpedoed and sunk in the Atlantic Ocean 90 nautical miles (170 km) north west of Georgetown, British Guiana (8°40′N 59°20′W) by U-160 ( Kriegsmarine) with the loss of 56 of her 78 crew. Survivors were rescued by Midosi ( Brazil).
Edgar Allan Poe	United States	World War II: The Liberty ship was torpedoed and damaged in the Pacific Ocean south east of Noumea, New Caledonia by I-21 ( Imperial Japanese Navy). She was towed to Noumea by HMNZS Kiwi and HMNZS Matai (both Royal New Zealand Navy), where she was declared a total loss.
Ha-30	Imperial Japanese Navy	World War II: The midget submarine's rudder was damaged when she was released from I-16 ( Imperial Japanese Navy), about 10.8 nautical miles (20.0 km) from Cape Esperance, Guadalcanal, Solomon Islands, and she was scuttled. Both crewm made it to shore at Marovovo.
Hōkoku Maru	Imperial Japanese Navy	World War II: The Hokoku Maru-class auxiliary cruiser was shelled and sunk in the Indian Ocean south west of the Cocos Islands (19°45′S 90°40′E) by HMIS Bengal (Royal Indian Navy) and the merchant tanker Ondina (Netherlands). Seventy-six of her 334 crew were killed. Survivors were rescued by Aikoku Maru ( Imperial Japanese Navy).
USS Joseph Hewes	United States Navy	World War II: Convoy UGF 1: The troopship was torpedoed and sunk in the Mediterranean Sea off Fedhala, Morocco (33°40′N 7°30′W) by U-173 ( Kriegsmarine) with the loss of approximately 100 of her 358 crew.
Kobe Maru	Imperial Japanese Navy	The requisitioned cargo liner was sunk 87 miles (140 km) off the mouth of the Yangtze River in a collision with Tenzan Maru. There were no casualties. Survivors rescued by Takashima ( Imperial Japanese Navy), Reizan Maru and Unzan Maru (both).p
Nieuw Zeeland	Netherlands	World War II: Operation Torch: The troopship was torpedoed and sunk in the Mediterranean Sea 80 nautical miles (150 km) east of Gibraltar (35°57′N 3°58′W) by U-380 ( Kriegsmarine) with the loss of fifteen of the 256 people on board. Survivors were rescued by HNLMS Isaac Sweers (Royal Netherlands Navy) and HMS Porcupine (Royal Navy).
Sidi Ferruch	(France) Vichy French Navy	World War II: Operation Torch: The Redoutable-class submarine was sunk off Fedhala by aircraft from USS Suwanee ( United States Navy) with the loss of all 66 crew.
Tenzan Maru	Japan	The WWI British C-class standard ore carrier was sunk 87 nautical miles (161 km) off the mouth of the Yangtze River in a collision with Kobe Maru (Japan). There were no casualties. Survivors were rescued by Takashima ( Imperial Japanese Navy), Reizan Maru and Unzan Maru (both).
Thessalia	Germany	World War II: The cargo ship was bombed and sunk 20 nautical miles (37 km) southwest of Benghazi, Libya by Royal Air Force aircraft.
TKA-74	Soviet Navy	World War II: The G-5-class motor torpedo boat was damaged by a Luftwaffe aircraft on 7 November and sank under tow in the Black Sea off Lazarevskoye four days later. Her crew were rescued.
HMS Unbeaten	Royal Navy	World War II: The U-class submarine was bombed and sunk in the Bay of Biscay by a Vickers Wellington aircraft of 172 Squadron, Royal Air Force with the loss of all 36 crew.
Veerhaven	Netherlands	World War II: The cargo ship was shelled and sunk in the South Atlantic east of Brazil by Leonardo da Vinci (Regia Marina) (3°51′S 29°22′W). Her crew survived.
Venice Maru	Japan	World War II: The cargo liner was torpedoed and sunk off the coast of Qingdao, China (33°36′N 123°44′E) by USS Haddock ( United States Navy). Four passengers and 39 of her crew were killed.
Viceroy of India	United Kingdom	World War II: Operation Torch: The troopship was torpedoed and damaged in the Mediterranean Sea 34 nautical miles (63 km) north west of Oran, Algeria by U-407 ( Kriegsmarine) with the loss of four of the 454 people on board. She was taken in tow by HMS Boadicea (Royal Navy) but later foundered at 36°24′N 0°35′W. Survivors were rescued by HMS Boadicea.

== 12 November ==
List of shipwrecks: 12 November 1942
Ship	State	Description
Browning	United Kingdom	World War II: Convoy KMS 2: The cargo ship was torpedoed and sunk in the Mediterranean Sea off Oran, Algeria (35°53′N 0°33′W) by U-593 ( Kriegsmarine), with the loss of one of her 62 crew. Survivors were rescued by HMT Fluellen (Royal Navy).
Buchanan	Panama	World War II: The cargo ship was torpedoed and sunk in the Atlantic Ocean (52°06′N 25°54′W) by U-224 ( Kriegsmarine). Her 73 crew were rescued by HMS Clare, HMS Leamington (both Royal Navy) and Lightning ( United States).
USS Edward Rutledge	United States Navy	World War II: Operation Torch / Convoy UGF 1: The Edward Rutledge-class transport (9,360 GRT, 1931) was torpedoed and sunk in the Fedhala Roads (33°40′N 7°35′W) by U-130 ( Kriegsmarine) with the loss of fifteen of her crew.
USS Erie	United States Navy	World War II: Convoy TAG 20: The Erie-class gunboat was torpedoed and damaged in the Atlantic Ocean north west of Willemstad, Netherlands Antilles by U-163 ( Kriegsmarine). USS Erie was beached off Willemstad with the loss of seven of her 180 crew. Although later towed into Willemstad, she capsized during repairs. USS Erie was declared a constructive total loss.
F 137 Falco	Regia Marina	World War II: The auxiliary patrol vessel was sunk by a mine in the Mediterranean Sea off Ras Tayones, Libya. There were no casualties.
HMS Hecla	Royal Navy	World War II: Operation Torch: The Hecla-class destroyer tender was torpedoed and damaged in the Atlantic Ocean west of Gibraltar (35°43′N 9°54′W) by U-515 ( Kriegsmarine). She sank the next day with the loss of 283 of her 847 crew. Survivors were rescued by HMS Venomous and HMS Marne (both Royal Navy).
Hokkai Maru	Japan	World War II: The rescue tug was torpedoed and sunk off the coast of French Indochina by USS Grenadier ( United States Navy).
USS Hugh L. Scott	United States Navy	World War II: Operation Torch / Convoy UGF 1: The Hugh L. Scott-class transport was torpedoed and sunk in the Fedhala Roads (33°40′N 7°35′W) by U-130 ( Kriegsmarine) with the loss of 59 of her 119 crew.
HMS Karanja	Royal Navy	World War II: Operation Torch: The landing ship infantry was bombed and sunk off Bougie, Algeria by Luftwaffe aircraft. Thirty-nine of her crew were killed and one died of wounds.
Rogist	United States	The vessel was sunk in a collision in the Atlantic Ocean 7 miles (11 km) south east of Cape Charles Lighthouse, Virginia with USS SC-330 ( United States Navy).
SF 37	Kriegsmarine	The Siebel ferry was sunk off Gazala, Libya by Allied aircraft. There were two dead and one wounded.
USS Tasker H. Bliss	United States Navy	World War II: Operation Torch / Convoy UGF 1: The Tasker H. Bliss-class transport was torpedoed and sunk in the Fedhala Roads (33°40′N 7°35′W) by U-130 ( Kriegsmarine) with the loss of 31 of the 235 people on board.
HMS Tynwald	Royal Navy	World War II: The anti-aircraft ship was torpedoed by Argo off Bougie with the loss of ten of her crew.
U-272	Kriegsmarine	The Type VIIC submarine collided with U-634 ( Kriegsmarine) and sank off Hela with the loss of nineteen of her 48 crew.
U-660	Kriegsmarine	World War II: The Type VIIC submarine was depth charged and damaged in the Mediterranean Sea north of Oran by HMS Lotus and HMS Starwort (both Royal Navy). She was consequently scuttled as a result of damage received with the loss of two of her 47 crew.

== 13 November ==
List of shipwrecks: 13 November 1942
Ship	State	Description
Akatsuki	Imperial Japanese Navy	World War II: Naval Battle of Guadalcanal: The Akatsuki-class destroyer was shelled and sunk in the Pacific Ocean off Savo Island, Solomon Islands (9°17′S 159°56′E) by United States Navy cruisers and destroyers with the loss of 181 of her 197 crew. Survivors were rescued by American warships and taken as prisoners of war.
Alsina	France	World War II: The cargo ship was bombed and sunk at Bougie, Algeria. She was refloated in 1943 and scrapped in 1953.
USS Atlanta	United States Navy	World War II: Naval Battle of Guadalcanal: The Atlanta-class cruiser was scuttled 3 nautical miles (5.6 km) west of Lunga Point, Solomon Islands due to battle damage. Of the ship's complement of 735, a total of 172 men were killed and 79 wounded.
USS Barton	United States Navy	World War II: Naval Battle of Guadalcanal: The Benson-class destroyer was torpedoed and sunk off Guadalcanal, Solomon Islands by Amatsukaze ( Imperial Japanese Navy) with the loss of 164 of her 206 crew. Survivors were rescued by Higgins boats from Guadalanal and by USS Portland ( United States Navy).
Bice	Italy	World War II: The coaster was torpedoed and sunk in the Mediterranean Sea east of Sousse, Tunisia by HMS Safari (Royal Navy). There were no casualties.
Canard	(France) Vichy French Navy	The minesweeping tug was lost.
USS Cushing	United States Navy	World War II: Naval Battle of Guadalcanal: The Mahan-class destroyer was shelled and sunk off Savo Island by Imperial Japanese Navy warships. About 70 men were killed or missing.
Excello	United States	World War II: The cargo ship was torpedoed and sunk in the Indian Ocean 50 nautical miles (93 km) south of Port St. John, South Africa (32°23′S 30°07′E) by U-181 ( Kriegsmarine) with the loss of two of her 51 crew. Survivors were rescued by HMHS Atlantis (Royal Navy) or reached land in their lifeboats.
Glenfinlas	United Kingdom	World War II: The cargo ship was bombed and sunk off Bougie by Luftwaffe aircraft.
Hiei	Imperial Japanese Navy	World War II: Naval Battle of Guadalcanal: The Kongō-class battlecruiser was shelled and damaged in the Pacific Ocean by USS Laffey and USS San Francisco (both United States Navy). She was then bombed by Boeing B-17 Flying Fortress aircraft of the United States Army Air Force and torpedoed by Grumman TBF Avenger aircraft of the United States Navy. She was scuttled by an Imperial Japanese Navy destroyer with the loss of 188 of her 1,360 crew.
HNLMS Isaac Sweers	Royal Netherlands Navy	World War II: Operation Torch: The Gerard Callenburgh-class destroyer was torpedoed and sunk in the Mediterranean Sea 60 nautical miles (110 km) north west of Algiers, Algeria (37°23′N 2°12′E) by U-431 ( Kriegsmarine) with the loss of 108 of her 194 crew.
USS Juneau	United States Navy	World War II: Naval Battle of Guadalcanal: The Atlanta-class cruiser was torpedoed and damaged by Japanese destroyer Amatsukaze ( Imperial Japanese Navy) during the battle. After the battle while withdrawing for repairs she was torpedoed again and sunk at 10°34′S 161°04′E by I-26 ( Imperial Japanese Navy). Five hundred and eighty-seven of her crew were killed in the sinking and another 100 died during the eight-day ordeal before ten survivors were rescued. The wreck was located on 17 March 2018.
USS Laffey	United States Navy	World War II: Naval Battle of Guadalcanal: The Benson-class destroyer was shelled and sunk. Of the 247 crew members aboard, 59 were killed and 116 wounded.
Le Conquérant	(France) Vichy French Navy	During a voyage from Casablanca, Morocco, to Dakar, Senegal, the Redoutable-class submarine was sunk in the Atlantic Ocean off the Rio de Oro 700 nautical miles (1,296 km; 806 mi) south west of Casablanca by depth charges dropped by two Consolidated PBY Catalina flying boats of Patrol Squadron 92 (VP-92), United States Navy after she failed to respond to their recognition challenges. Her entire crew of 57 was lost.
Lillian E. Kerr	Canada	The schooner collided with Alcoa Pilot ( United States) and sank off the Bay of Fundy with the loss of all seven hands.
Louise Moller	United Kingdom	World War II: The cargo ship was torpedoed and sunk in the Indian Ocean 240 nautical miles (440 km) east south east of Durban, Union of South Africa (30°50′S 35°54′E) by U-178 ( Kriegsmarine) with the loss of eleven of her 63 crew. Survivors were rescued by HMS Douglas (Royal Navy) and Hopewell ( United Kingdom).
Maron	United Kingdom	World War II: Operation Torch: The cargo ship was torpedoed and sunk in the Mediterranean Sea (36°27′N 0°55′W) by U-81 ( Kriegsmarine). Her 81 crew were rescued by HMS Marigold (Royal Navy).
USS Monssen	United States Navy	World War II: Naval Battle of Guadalcanal: The Gleaves-class destroyer was shelled and sunk off Savo Island. One hundred and forty-five of her crew were killed and 97 were wounded.
Star of Scotland	United States	World War II: The schooner was shelled and sunk in the South Atlantic 900 nautical miles (1,700 km) south west of Luderitz Bay, South-West Africa 26°30′S 0°20′W by U-159 ( Kriegsmarine) with the loss of one of her seventeen crew. Survivors sailed in their lifeboat 1,000 nautical miles (1,900 km) to Portuguese West Africa, arriving on 1 December.
U-411	Kriegsmarine	World War II: The Type VIIC submarine was depth charged and sunk in the Atlantic Ocean west of Gibraltar (36°00′N 9°53′W) by a Lockheed Hudson aircraft of 500 Squadron, Royal Air Force with the loss of all 46 crew.
Yūdachi	Imperial Japanese Navy	World War II: Naval Battle of Guadalcanal: The Shiratsuyu-class destroyer was shelled and damaged by United States Navy ships and was abandoned with the loss of nineteen of her crew. Survivors were rescued by Samidare ( Imperial Japanese Navy, which attempted to scuttle Yūdachi. She was later scuttled by USS Portland ( United States Navy).

== 14 November ==
List of shipwrecks: 14 November 1942
Ship	State	Description
Arizona Maru	Imperial Japanese Army	World War II: Second Assault Convoy for Tassafaronga: The Hawaii Maru-class anti-aircraft transport was bombed and sunk 80 nautical miles (150 km) north-west of Savo Island, Solomon Islands (08°30′S 158°45′E) by Douglas SBD Dauntless aircraft from USS Enterprise ( United States Navy). One thousand survivors were rescued by Makinami ( Imperial Japanese Navy).
Brisbane Maru	Imperial Japanese Army	World War II: Second Assault Convoy for Tassafaronga: The Sydney Maru-class transport ship was bombed and sunk 80 nautical miles (150 km) north west of Savo Island (8°30′S 158°45′E) by Douglas SBD Dauntless aircraft from USS Enterprise ( United States Navy) and Douglas SBD Dauntless aircraft of the United States Marine Corps from Guadalcanal, Solomon Islands. Five hundred and fifty survivors were rescued by Kawakaze ( Imperial Japanese Navy).
Canberra Maru	Imperial Japanese Army	World War II: Second Assault Convoy for Tassafaronga: The Canberra Maru-class transport ship was bombed and sunk off Guadalcanal (8°30′S 158°45′E) by Douglas SBD Dauntless aircraft of the United States Marine Corps from Guadalcanal.
USS Electra	United States Navy	World War II: The Arcturus-class attack cargo ship was torpedoed and damaged in the Mediterranean Sea by U-173 ( Kriegsmarine). She was beached two days later at Casablanca, Morocco. She was subsequently repaired and returned to service.
Kinugasa	Imperial Japanese Navy	World War II: Naval Battle of Guadalcanal: The Aoba-class cruiser was bombed and sunk south west of Rendova (09°15′S 157°45′E) by Grumman TBF Avenger and Douglas SBD Dauntless aircraft based on USS Enterprise ( United States Navy) with the loss of her captain, executive officer, and 511 of her crew.
Max Behrend	Germany	World War II: The tug was bombed and sunk at Tobruk, Libya during a British air raid. She was later salvaged, repaired and entered British service.
Nako Maru	Imperial Japanese Army	World War II: Reinforcement Group convoy: The Nagara Maru-class auxiliary transport was bombed and sunk 80 miles (130 km) north west of Savo Island (8°30′S 158°45′E) by Douglas SBD Dauntless aircraft of the United States Marine Corps from Guadalcanal. One thousand, one hundred survivors were rescued by Suzukaze ( Imperial Japanese Navy).
Nagara Maru	Imperial Japanese Army	World War II: Second Assault Convoy for Tassafaronga: The Nagara Maru-class auxiliary transport was torpedoed and sunk off Guadalcanal (8°30′S 158°45′E) by Grumman TBF Avenger aircraft of VT-10, United States Navy. Survivors were rescued by Amigiri and Mochizuki (both Imperial Japanese Navy).
Narkunda	United Kingdom	World War II: The ocean liner was bombed and sunk in the Mediterranean Sea off Bougie, Algeria (36°49′38″N 5°00′44″E) by Luftwaffe aircraft with the loss of 31 lives.
USS Preston	United States Navy	World War II: Naval Battle of Guadalcanal: The Mahan-class destroyer was shelled and sunk by Japanese warships off Savo Island. One hundred and sixteen of her crew were killed.
Scapa Flow	Panama	World War II: The cargo ship was torpedoed and sunk in the Atlantic Ocean (approximately 12°N 30°W) by U-134 ( Kriegsmarine) with the loss of 33 of her 47 crew and thirteen United States Navy Armed Guard. Six of the seven Navy gunners lost were by being trapped under the collapsed gun deck. Survivors were rescued by HMS Armeria (Royal Navy).
Scillin	Italy	World War II: The cargo liner was torpedoed, shelled and sunk in the Mediterranean Sea 9 nautical miles (17 km) off Kuriat, Tunisia by HMS Sahib (Royal Navy). She was carrying 814 or 830 British prisoners of war, 30 Italian guards and 84 crew; 79 Italians and between 788 and 805 prisoners died. Sahib rescued the 61 survivors (35 Italian and 25 or 26 prisoners).
Shinanogawa Maru	Imperial Japanese Army	World War II: Second Assault Convoy for Tassafaronga: The Uyo Maru-class transport ship was bombed and sunk 80 nautical miles (150 km) north west of Savo Island (08°30′S 158°45′E) by Douglas SBD Dauntless aircraft of the United States Marine Corps from Guadalcanal. Five hundred and seventy survivors were rescued by Naganami ( Imperial Japanese Navy).
U-595	Kriegsmarine	World War II: The Type VIIC submarine was depth charged and sunk in the Mediterranean Sea north of Oran, Algeria by two Lockheed Hudson aircraft of 608 Squadron, Royal Air Force. Her 45 crew survived.
U-605	Kriegsmarine	World War II: The Type VIIC submarine was depth charged and sunk in the Mediterranean Sea off Algiers, Algeria (36°20′N 1°01′W) by a Lockheed Hudson aircraft of 233 Squadron, Royal Air Force with the loss of all 46 crew.
Warwick Castle	United Kingdom	World War II: Convoy MKF 1X: The troopship was torpedoed and sunk in the Atlantic Ocean 200 nautical miles (370 km) north west of Cape Espichel, Portugal (39°12′N 13°25′W) by U-413 ( Kriegsmarine) with the loss of 96 of the 462 people on board. Survivors were rescued by HMS Achates, HMS Vansittart (both Royal Navy), Leinster ( United Kingdom) and HMCS Louisburg (Royal Canadian Navy).

== 15 November ==
List of shipwrecks: 15 November 1942
Ship	State	Description
HMS Algerine	Royal Navy	World War II: The Algerine-class minesweeper was torpedoed and sunk in the Mediterranean Sea off Bougie, Algeria by Ascianghi (Regia Marina) with the loss of 80 of her crew.
Azra	Panama	The cargo ship collided with HMCS Saguenay (Royal Canadian Navy). The collision dislodged two depth charges, which exploded and sank her in the Atlantic Ocean 12 nautical miles (22 km) south of Cape Race, Dominion of Newfoundland with the loss of a crew member.
Annie Hugo Stinnes 6	Germany	World War II: The cargo ship struck a mine and sank in the North Sea south west of Borkum.
HMS Avenger	Royal Navy	World War II: Operation Torch / Convoy MKF 1: The Avenger-class escort carrier was torpedoed and sunk in the Atlantic Ocean near Gibraltar (36°15′N 7°45′W) by U-155 ( Kriegsmarine) with the loss of 514 of her 526 crew.
Ayanami	Imperial Japanese Navy	World War II: Naval Battle of Guadalcanal: The Fubuki-class destroyer was shelled and damaged in the Pacific Ocean off Guadalcanal, Solomon Islands by USS Washington ( United States Navy). with the loss of 27 of her 219 crew. The ship was abandoned, with the remaining crew being taken off by Uranami ( Imperial Japanese Navy), which scuttled Ayanami at 9°10′S 159°52′E.
USS Benham	United States Navy	World War II: Naval Battle of Guadalcanal: The Benham-class destroyer was scuttled following battle damage.
Ettrick	United Kingdom	World War II: Convoy MKF 1Y: The troopship was torpedoed and sunk in the Atlantic Ocean 120 nautical miles (220 km) north west of Gibraltar (36°13′N 7°54′W) by U-155 ( Kriegsmarine) with the loss of 24 of the 336 people on board. Survivors were rescued by HNoMS Glaisdale (Royal Norwegian Navy).
Hirokawa Maru	Imperial Japanese Army	World War II: Tanaka's Reinforcement Group: The Kamikawa Maru-class anti-aircraft transport was deliberately beached undamaged to unload troops at the mouth of the Bonegi River, Guadalcanal (9°20′S 159°50′E). She was destroyed when shelled by USS Meade ( United States Navy) and bombed by Douglas SBD Dauntless aircraft of the United States Navy and United States Marine Corps.
King Arthur	United Kingdom	World War II: The cargo ship was torpedoed and sunk in the Atlantic Ocean (10°30′N 59°50′W) by U-67 ( Kriegsmarine). Her 40 crew were rescued by a United States Navy patrol ship.
Kinugawa Maru	Imperial Japanese Army	World War II: Tanaka's Reinforcement Group: The transport ship was deliberately beached undamaged to unload troops at the mouth of the Bonegi River, Guadalcanal (9°20′S 169°50′E). Destroyed when shelled by USS Meade ( United States Navy) and bombed by Douglas SBD Dauntless aircraft of the United States Navy and United States Marine Corps.
Kirishima	Imperial Japanese Navy	World War II: Naval Battle of Guadalcanal: The Kongō-class battlecruiser was shelled and sunk in Ironbottom Sound (9°05′S 159°42′E) by USS Washington ( United States Navy) with the loss of 212 of her 1,360 crew.
Kulibekov	Soviet Union	World War II: The tanker (1,754 GRT) was sunk was sunk by German aircraft near Astrakhan. Four crew were killed, 43 crew and passengers were rescued.
Le Tonnant	Vichy French Navy	World War II: Operation Torch: The Redoutable-class submarine was scuttled off Cadiz, Spain by her crew.
HMCS Saguenay	Royal Canadian Navy	The wrecked stern of HMCS Saguenay World War II: The River-class destroyer collided with Azra (Panama) off Cape Race and was severely damaged when two depth charges exploded under her stern. She was declared a constructive total loss, serving as a depot ship for the remainer of the war.
U-98	Kriegsmarine	World War II: The Type VIIC submarine was depth charged and sunk in the Atlantic Ocean south west of Cape St. Vincent, Portugal (36°09′N 7°42′W) by HMS Wrestler (Royal Navy) with the loss of all 46 crew.
U-259	Kriegsmarine	World War II: The Type VIIC submarine was depth charged and sunk in the Mediterranean Sea (37°20′N 3°05′E) by a Lockheed Hudson aircraft of 500 Squadron, Royal Air Force with the loss of all 48 crew.
Unkai Maru	Japan	World War II: The cargo ship was sunk in an air attack at Rabaul, Papua New Guinea.
USS Walke	United States Navy	World War II: Naval Battle of Guadalcanal: The Sims-class destroyer was torpedoed, shelled and sunk with the loss of 82 of her crew.
Yumaura Maru	Imperial Japanese Army	World War II: Tanaka's Reinforcement Group: The Yamabiko Maru-class auxiliary transport was deliberately beached undamaged to unload troops at Doma Cove, Guadalcanal. She was destroyed when shelled by USS Meade ( United States Navy) and bombed by Douglas SBD Dauntless aircraft of the United States Navy and United States Marine Corps.
Yamatsuki Maru	Imperial Japanese Army	World War II: Tanaka's Reinforcement Group: The Shinko Maru-class auxiliary transport was deliberately beached undamaged to unload troops at Arulingo Point, Guadalcanal. She was destroyed when shelled by USS Meade ( United States Navy), United States Marine Corps artillery, and bombed by Douglas SBD Dauntless aircraft of the United States Navy and United States Marine Corps. Her wreck was scrapped in situ in the late 1950s.
Zvir	Yugoslavia	The cargo ship collided with Skagerak (Norway) and sank in the Pacific Ocean (37°27′S 150°17′E).

== 16 November ==
List of shipwrecks: 16 November 1942
Ship	State	Description
Boston Maru	Imperial Japanese Army	World War II: Convoy Y: The Yoshida Maru No. 1-class transport was torpedoed and sunk in the Pacific Ocean south east of Palau (06°16′N 135°19′E) by USS Seal ( United States Navy). Two hundred and twenty-eight troops, two gunners and sixteen of her crew were killed. There were 472 survivors.
Clan Mactaggart	United Kingdom	World War II: Convoy MKS 1X: The cargo ship was torpedoed and sunk in the Atlantic Ocean 50 nautical miles (93 km) south west of Cádiz, Spain (36°08′N 7°23′W), by U-92 ( Kriegsmarine) with the loss of three of the 172 people on board. Survivors were rescued by HMS Coreopsis (Royal Navy).
Hans Arp	Germany	World War II: The cargo ship was torpedoed and sunk in the Mediterranean Sea off Benghazi, Libya (30°28′N 18°48′E) by HMS Safari (Royal Navy). Two people were killed and one was wounded; there were 83 survivors.
Irish Pine	Ireland	World War II: The Design 1013 ship was torpedoed and sunk in the Atlantic Ocean (42°45′N 58°00′W) by U-608 ( Kriegsmarine) with the loss of all 33 crew.
Libby, McNeill & Libby II No. 2	United States	The scow sank in the waters of the Territory of Alaska.
Libby, McNeill & Libby III No. 3	United States	The scow sank in the waters of the Territory of Alaska.
Libby, McNeill & Libby III No. 7	United States	The scow sank in the waters of the Territory of Alaska.
Libby, McNeill & Libby VII No 4	United States	The scow sank in the waters of the Territory of Alaska.
MZ 716	Regia Marina	World War II: The landing ship ran aground in Ras el Sultan Bay, Liby. There were no casualties, but salvage was impossible and she was destroyed by her crew one or two days later.
V 277 San Paolo	Regia Marina	World War II: The schooner/auxiliary patrol vessel was shelled and sunk in the Mediterranean Sea off Gorgona by HMS Splendid (Royal Navy) (43°34′N 09°37′E). Her fifteen crew survived.
SF 235	Kriegsmarine	The Siebel ferry foundered on this date.
Triton	Hellenic Navy	World War II: The Proteus-class submarine was sunk in the Aegean Sea off Euboia by UJ-2102 ( Kriegsmarine) with the loss of 23 of her 53 crew.
U-173	Kriegsmarine	World War II: The Type IX submarine was depth charged and sunk in the Atlantic Ocean off Casablanca, Morocco (33°40′N 07°35′W) by USS Quick, USS Swanson and USS Woolsey (all United States Navy) with the loss of all 57 crew.

== 17 November ==
List of shipwrecks: 17 November 1942
Ship	State	Description
Aprile	Italy	The coaster was sunk by an explosion of unknown origin off La Goulette, Tunisia. There were eight dead and four survivors.
City of Corinth	United Kingdom	World War II: The cargo ship was torpedoed and damaged in the Atlantic Ocean (10°55′N 61°01′W) by U-508 ( Kriegsmarine) with the loss of eleven of her 87 crew. She later foundered at 10°52′30″N 61°03′30″W. Survivors were rescued by USS PC-536 ( United States Navy). Radio operator Walter Thorp returned to his cabin to rescue his canary and missed the lifeboat. But after jumping into the sea, with the bird in its bamboo cage, it kept him awake as he swam, by singing. Thorp and the canary were eventually rescued by a cargo ship. The bird lived for another 13 years.
Giulio Giordani	Italy	World War II: The tanker was torpedoed and heavily damaged in the Mediterranean Sea by British aircraft. Of the 141 men aboard (Italian crewmen and soldiers and German Flak gunners), 35 were killed and four died of their wounds later. The burning ship was abandoned and the wreck was sunk two days later by HMS Porpoise (Royal Navy) (32°58′N 15°38′E).
Hindenburg	Germany	World War II: The cargo ship struck a mine south of Utö, Finland (59°40′N 21°20′E). She was taken in tow by V 305 Ostpreussen ( Kriegsmarine) but consequently sank on 19 November. Six of 1,000 Soviet prisoners of war on board were killed.
Mount Taurus	Greece	World War II: Convoy ON 144: The cargo ship was torpedoed and sunk in the Atlantic Ocean (54°30′N 37°30′W) by U-264 ( Kriegsmarine) with the loss of two of her 40 crew. Mount Taurus was on a voyage from Oban, Argyllshire, United Kingdom to Halifax, Nova Scotia, Canada.
Nissei Maru	Imperial Japanese Navy	World War II: The Standard Peacetime Type 1E cargo ship was torpedoed and sunk in Flying Fish Cove, Christmas Island (10°30′S 105°35′E) by USS Searaven ( United States Navy). A crew member was killed.
Oregon Maru	Imperial Japanese Army	World War II: Convoy No. 726: The Daifuku Maru No. 1-class auxiliary repair ship was torpedoed and sunk 36 miles (58 km) west of Olagapo (14°50′N 119°45′E) by USS Salmon ( United States Navy). Five hundred and thirty people, including seven gunners and 74 of her crew, were killed.
Piemonte	Italy	World War II: The troopship was torpedoed and damaged in the Mediterranean Sea north of Sicily by HMS Umbra (Royal Navy). She was beached near Cape Rasocolmo and then put into Messina, where she was withdrawn from service. Piemonte was scuttled when Messina was evacuated in August 1943. Her crew survived; three were wounded.
U-331	Kriegsmarine	World War II: The Type VIIC submarine was depth charged and damaged in the Mediterranean Sea north of Algiers, Algeria by a Lockheed Hudson aircraft of 500 Squadron, Royal Air Force. Unable to dive, she surrendered, but was later torpedoed and sunk by a Fairey Albacore aircraft based on HMS Formidable (Royal Navy) with the loss of 32 of her 49 crew. The crew of the Albacore were unaware that the ship had surrendered.
Widestone	United Kingdom	World War II: Convoy ON 144: The cargo ship was torpedoed and sunk in the Atlantic Ocean (54°30′N 37°10′W) by U-184 ( Kriegsmarine) with the loss of all 42 crew.

== 18 November ==
List of shipwrecks: 18 November 1942
Ship	State	Description
Brilliant	United States	World War II: Convoy SC 109: The tanker was torpedoed, set ablaze and damaged in the Atlantic Ocean (50°45′N 45°53′W) by U-43 ( Kriegsmarine). She reached St. John's, Dominion of Newfoundland, departing under tow of HMS Frisky (Royal Navy) on 18 January 1943. She broke in two at 46°13′N 58°38′W on 20 January. The bow section sank with the loss of eleven of her 55 crew. Survivors on the stern section were rescued by on 24 January HMCS Goderich (Royal Canadian Navy). The stern section was taken in tow but sank on 25 January at 45°18′N 55°12′W.
Columbia Maru	Imperial Japanese Army	World War II: The Columbia Maru-class auxiliary troop transport was torpedoed and damaged by HMS Trusty (Royal Navy) off Penang, Malaya and was beached at (06°21′N 099°09′E). She was pumped out and refloated in December, repaired at an unknown location and returned to service.
F 346	Kriegsmarine	World War II: The Type A Marinefahrprahm was damaged by gunfire in the Mediterranean Sea near Ras el Aali, Libya by HMS Safari (Royal Navy). She ran aground and was wrecked.
Havana Maru	Imperial Japanese Army	World War II: Convoy No. 726: The Hague Maru-class auxiliary transport was bombed and sunk off Kahili Airfield, Bougainville Island, Papua New Guinea (06°48′S 155°49′E) by Boeing B-17 Flying Fortress aircraft of the 5th Air Force, United States Army Air Force.
Krasnoye Znamya	Soviet Navy	World War II: The gunboat was torpedoed and sunk in Lavensaari Harbour by Syoksy (Finnish Navy) with the loss of 64 of her crew. She was raised in November 1943, repaired, and recommissioned in September 1944.
Linwood	United Kingdom	World War II: The cargo ship struck a mine and sank in the Thames Estuary.
HNoMS Montbretia	Royal Norwegian Navy	World War II: Convoy ONS 144: The Flower-class corvette was torpedoed and sunk in the Atlantic Ocean (53°37′N 38°15′W) by U-262 ( Kriegsmarine) with the loss of 40 Norwegian and two British crew. Twenty survivors were rescued by HNoMS Potentilla (Royal Norwegian Navy).
Parismina	United States	World War II: Convoy ONS 144: The refrigerated cargo liner was torpedoed and sunk in the Atlantic Ocean south south east of Cape Farewell, Greenland (54°07′N 38°26′W) by U-624 ( Kriegsmarine) with the loss of twenty of the 75 people on board. Survivors were rescued by Perth ( United Kingdom) and HNoMS Rose (Royal Norwegian Navy).
President Sergent	United Kingdom	World War II: Convoy ONS 144: The tanker was torpedoed and sunk in the Atlantic Ocean south south east of Cape Farewell (54°07′N 38°26′W) by U-624 ( Kriegsmarine) with the loss of twenty of the 59 people on board. Survivors were rescued by Perth ( United Kingdom).
Sado Maru	Imperial Japanese Army	World War II:The Sakito Maru class auxiliary Anti-Aircraft transport was bombed and sunk while anchored at Elebenta, Shortland Islands (8°30′S 158°45′E) by Boeing B-17 Flying Fortress and Lockheed P-38 Lightning aircraft of the United States Army Air Force.
Tortugas	Norway	World War II: The cargo ship was torpedoed and sunk in the Caribbean Sea east of Barbados by U-67 ( Kriegsmarine). Her 38 crew survived, but two were taken as prisoners of war. Of the other 36, eighteen were rescued by Herman F. Whiton ( United States), ten reached land in their lifeboat and eight were rescued by a Yugoslavian ship.
Tower Grange	United Kingdom	World War II: The cargo ship was torpedoed and sunk in the Atlantic Ocean 250 nautical miles (460 km) north east of Cayenne, French Guiana (6°20′N 49°10′W) by U-154 ( Kriegsmarine) with the loss of six of her 47 crew. Survivors were rescued by Castalia and Baron Belhaven (both United Kingdom).
Yaka	United States	World War II: Convoy ONS 144: The cargo ship was torpedoed and damaged in the Atlantic Ocean south east of Cape Farewell, Greenland by U-624 ( Kriegsmarine). She was later torpedoed and sunk at 54°07′N 38°26′W by U-522 ( Kriegsmarine). Her 52 crew were rescued by HMS Vervain (Royal Navy).

== 19 November ==
List of shipwrecks: 19 November 1942
Ship	State	Description
Birgitte	United Kingdom	World War II: The cargo ship was torpedoed and sunk in the English Channel 5.5 nautical miles (10.2 km) off the Eddystone Lighthouse, Devon by Kriegsmarine Schnellboote. Ten of her 23 crew were killed.
Gunda	Norway	World War II: The cargo ship was torpedoed and sunk in the Indian Ocean (25°40′S 33°53′E) by U-181 ( Kriegsmarine) with the loss of 38 of her 46 crew.
Ha-37	Imperial Japanese Navy	World War II: The midget submarine developed a serious oil leak in her steering system six miles (9.7 km) off Cape Esperance, Guadalcanal, Solomon Islands, and was scuttled. Her two crew made it to shore.
Lab	Norway	World War II: Convoy PW 250: The cargo ship was torpedoed and sunk in the English Channel 5 nautical miles (9.3 km) off the Eddystone Lighthouse by S 116 ( Kriegsmarine) with the loss of three of her 21 crew. Survivors were rescued by a Royal Navy minesweeper.
MN-01	Kriegsmarine	World War II: The armed auxiliary was damaged by gunfire, and forced to beach in the Varangerfjord (69°56′N 30°02′E).
Schiff 18 Alteland	Kriegsmarine	World War II: The decoy ship was sunk by mines off Petsamo, Soviet Union with the loss of 28 of her 42 crew.
Scottish Chief	United Kingdom	World War II: The cargo ship was torpedoed and sunk in the Indian Ocean 200 nautical miles (370 km; 230 mi) east south east of Durban, Union of South Africa (30°39′S 34°41′E) by U-177 ( Kriegsmarine) with the loss of 36 of her 48 crew. Survivors were rescued by HMS Genista and HMS Jasmine (both Royal Navy).
Sperrbrecher 169 Ceres	Kriegsmarine	World War II: The Sperrbrecher (1,078 GRT) struck a mine and sank off Norderney (53°58′N 7°05′E). A crew member was killed.
Ullswater	Royal Navy	World War II: Convoy PW 250: The Lake-class whaler was torpedoed and sunk in the English Channel by S 112 ( Kriegsmarine).
USS YP-26	United States Navy	The patrol boat was destroyed by an explosion of undetermined origin while hauled out on a marine railway at Cristóbal, Panama Canal Zone.

== 20 November ==
List of shipwrecks: 20 November 1942
Ship	State	Description
British Promise	United Kingdom	World War II: The Empire Pym-type tanker was torpedoed and severely damaged in the Atlantic Ocean 200 nautical miles (370 km) south of the Newfoundland (43°53′N 55°02′W) by U-518 ( Kriegsmarine). She was subsequently repaired and returned to service.
Corinthiakos	Greece	World War II: The cargo ship was torpedoed and sunk in the Indian Ocean 35 nautical miles (65 km) north east of the Inhaca Lighthouse, Portuguese East Africa (25°42′S 33°27′E) by U-181 ( Kriegsmarine) with the loss of eleven of her 32 crew. Survivors were rescued by a Portuguese tug.
RFA Dewdale	Royal Fleet Auxiliary	World War II: The Landing Ship, Gantry was bombed and damaged at Bougie, Algeria .
F 358	Kriegsmarine	The Type A Marinefahrprahm went ashore in a storm south of Benghazi, Libya and was destroyed by her crew. Her passengers and crew survived.
Grangepark	United Kingdom	World War II: Convoy KMS 3: The cargo shi was torpedoed and sunk in the Atlantic Ocean (35°55′N 10°14′W) by U-263 ( Kriegsmarine) with the loss of four of the 71 people on board. Survivors were rescued by HMS Fowey (Royal Navy). Grangepark was on a voyage from Barry, Glamorgan to Oran, Algeria.
Lago Tana	Regia Marina	World War II: The auxiliary cruiser was sunk by British aircraft between Pantellaria and Lampedusa. Of the 90 crewmen and 127 military passengers, 215 died and only two were rescued.
HMS LCM 139	Royal Navy	The Landing Craft, Mechanized was stranded and became a total loss at Ras Kanayis, Libya with the loss of a crew member.
HMS LCT 120	Royal Navy	The LCT-2-class landing craft tank foundered in heavy weather off Bardia, Libya. A crew member was drowned.
Pierce Butler	United States	World War II: The Liberty ship was torpedoed and sunk in the Indian Ocean (29°40′S 36°35′E) by U-177 ( Kriegsmarine). Her 62 crew were rescued by HMS Fortune (Royal Navy).
Prins Harald	Norway	World War II: Convoy KMS 3: The cargo ship was torpedoed and sunk in the Atlantic Ocean 240 nautical miles (440 km) west of Gibraltar (35°55′N 10°14′W) by U-263 ( Kriegsmarine) with the loss of three of the 52 people on board.
USS YP-405	United States Navy	The patrol boat burned and sank off the Smith Shoal Lighthouse, in the Florida Keys (24°43′N 81°55′W).

== 21 November ==
List of shipwrecks: 21 November 1942
Ship	State	Description
Anneliese Essberger	Kriegsmarine	World War II: The supply ship was intercepted in the Atlantic Ocean by USS Cincinnati, USS Milwaukee and USS Somers (all United States Navy) and was scuttled by her crew 400 nautical miles (740 km) east of the Saint Peter and Saint Paul Archipelago, Brazil. Her 62 crew were rescued by USS Milwaukee and taken as prisoners of war.
Bintang	Netherlands	World War II: The cargo ship was torpedoed and sunk in the Atlantic Ocean 650 nautical miles (1,200 km) east of Trinidad (10°30′N 51°00′W by U-160 ( Kriegsmarine) with the loss of 22 of her 73 crew. Survivors were rescued by Black Point ( United States), Monte Altube (Spain) and Rodsley ( United Kingdom).
British Promise	United Kingdom	World War II: Convoy ON 145: The tanker was torpedoed and damaged in the Atlantic Ocean 200 nautical miles (370 km) south east of Placentia Bay by U-518 ( Kriegsmarine). She was subsequently repaired and returned to service.
British Renown	United Kingdom	World War II: Convoy ON 145: The tanker was torpedoed and damaged in the Atlantic Ocean 200 nautical miles (370 km) south east of Placentia Bay by U-518 ( Kriegsmarine. She was subsequently repaired and returned to service.
Empire Sailor	United Kingdom	World War II: Convoy ON 145: The cargo ship was torpedoed and sunk in the Atlantic Ocean (43°55′N 55°12′W) by U-518 ( Kriegsmarine) with the loss of 23 of the 65 people on board. Survivors were rescued by HMCS Minas and HMCS Timmins (both Royal Canadian Navy).
Empire Starling	United Kingdom	World War II: The refrigerated cargo ship was torpedoed and sunk in the Caribbean Sea north east of Barbados (13°05′N 56°20′W) by U-163 ( Kriegsmarine). Her 55 crew survived, although her captain was taken on board U-163 as a prisoner of war.
Turksib	Soviet Union	The cargo ship struck shoals at Seal Cape and was wrecked at Scotch Cap (54°24′15″N 164°47′30″W), on Unimak Island, Alaska Territory. All on board – 31 men and four women – were rescued. Turksib was on a voyage from Portland, Oregon, United States to Vladivostok. She later broke in two and became a total loss.
U-517	Kriegsmarine	World War II: The Type IXC submarine was depth charged and sunk in the Atlantic Ocean south west of Iceland (46°16′N 17°09′W) by Fairey Albacore aircraft of 817 Squadron, Fleet Air Arm based on HMS Victorious (Royal Navy) with the loss of one of her 53 crew.

== 22 November ==
List of shipwrecks: 22 November 1942
Ship	State	Description
A.G.T.N. No. 34	United States	The barge foundered in the Pass at Pensacola Bay.
Alcoa Pathfinder	United States	World War II: The Type C1 ship was torpedoed and sunk in the Indian Ocean 75 nautical miles (139 km) south of Lourenço Marques, Portuguese East Africa (26°45′S 33°10′E) by U-181 ( Kriegsmarine) with the loss of six of the 61 people on board.
Apalóide	Brazil	World War II: Convoy BRN 3: The cargo ship was torpedoed and sunk in the Atlantic Ocean east of Trinidad (13°28′N 54°42′W) by U-163 ( Kriegsmarine) with the loss of five of her 56 crew.
Else Kunkel II	Germany	World War II: The lugger struck a mine and sank in the Samsø Belt.
Favorita	Italy	World War II: The cargo ship was severely damaged by British aircraft in the Mediterranean Sea east of Cagliari, Sardinia (39°00′N 11°11′E) and was abandoned by her crew. She was shelled and sunk by HMS Splendid (Royal Navy).
Ha-12	Imperial Japanese Navy	The midget submarine vanished after being released from I-24 ( Imperial Japanese Navy) 14 miles (23 km) north west of Cape Esperance, Guadalcanal, Solomon Islands.
Khai Dinh	Japan	World War II: The ocean liner was bombed and sunk east of Haiphong, French Indochina (20°58′N 106°40′E) by aircraft of the United States Fourteenth Air Force. Seven people were killed.
Sokrushitelny	Soviet Navy	World War II: Convoy PQ 15: The destroyer was heavily damaged on 20 November, almost breaking in two, in heavy weather. She foundered in the Barents Sea (70°30′N 43°00′E. Fifteen crew died in the sinking while 184 were rescued, but thirteen died before reaching shore.

== 23 November ==
List of shipwrecks: 23 November 1942
Ship	State	Description
Benlomond	United Kingdom	World War II: The cargo ship was torpedoed and sunk in the Atlantic Ocean 750 nautical miles (1,390 km) east of the mouth of the Amazon River (0°30′N 38°45′W) by U-172 ( Kriegsmarine) with the loss of 53 of her 54 crew. The only survivor was rescued by a Brazilian fishing vessel 133 days later.
Caddo	United States	World War II: The Type T2-SE-A1 tanker was torpedoed and sunk in the Atlantic Ocean (42°25′N 48°27′W) by U-518 ( Kriegsmarine). Seventeen gunners and 42 crew manned three lifeboats, except for her master and one other officer who were taken on board U-518 as prisoners of war. Two lifeboats were never seen again, and only three gunners and three crewmen survived in their lifeboat before they were rescued by Motomar (Spain) on 8 December 1942.
Cranfield	United Kingdom	World War II: The cargo ship was torpedoed and sunk in the Indian Ocean (08°26′N 76°42′E) by I-166 ( Imperial Japanese Navy). Nine of her crew were killed. Three gunners and 64 crew sailed in lifeboats to Travancore, India.
Fertilia	Italy	World War II: The cargo ship was torpedoed and sunk in the Mediterranean Sea off Kerkennah, Tunisia (34°47′N 11°42′E) by HMS Porpoise (Royal Navy) with the loss of three of her eighteen crew.
Goolistan	United Kingdom	World War II: Convoy QP 15: The cargo ship straggled behind the convoy. She was torpedoed and sunk in the Greenland Sea (75°50′N 15°45′E) by U-625 ( Kriegsmarine) with the loss of all 52 crew.
Kuznets Lesov	Soviet Union	World War II: Convoy QP 15: The cargo ship straggled behind the convoy. She was torpedoed and sunk in the Greenland Sea (75°30′N 8°00′E) by U-601 ( Kriegsmarine) with the loss of all 41 crew.
Maggie	Germany	World War II: The cargo ship struck a mine and sank off Stolpmünde.
Tilawa	United Kingdom	World War II: The cargo liner was torpedoed and sunk in the Indian Ocean by I-29 ( Imperial Japanese Navy). Two hundred and fifty-two passengers and 28 crew were killed. Six hundred and twenty-eight survivors were rescued by HMS Birmingham (Royal Navy) and four by Carthage ( United Kingdom).

== 24 November ==
List of shipwrecks: 24 November 1942
Ship	State	Description
Aurora	Netherlands	World War II: The cargo ship was attacked and sunk by Axis aircraft at Phillippeville, Algeria. She was refloated in 1953.
Dorington Court	United Kingdom	World War II: The cargo ship was torpedoed, shelled and sunk in the Indian Ocean 105 nautical miles (194 km) east south east of Inhaca Island, Portuguese East Africa (27°00′S 34°45′E) by U-181 ( Kriegsmarine) with the loss of four of her 43 crew.
Hayashio	Imperial Japanese Navy	World War II: The Kagerō-class destroyer was bombed and damaged in the Huon Gulf (07°00′S 147°30′E) by Boeing B-17 Flying Fortress and North American B-25 Mitchell aircraft of the United States Army Air Force and Bristol Beaufighter aircraft of the Royal Australian Air Force. Fifty of her crew were killed and six were wounded. Shiratsuyu ( Imperial Japanese Navy) rescued the survivors and then scuttled her with a torpedo.
Klaus Oldendorff	Germany	World War II: The cargo ship struck a mine and sank in the Gulf of Finland.
M 3610 Leyden	Kriegsmarine	World War II: The minesweeper struck a mine and sank in the North Sea off Ostend, West Flanders, Belgium with the loss of four lives.
Luigi	Italy	World War II: The cargo ship was torpedoed and sunk in the Tyrrhenian Sea, east of Sardinia (40°02′N 11°20′E) by British aircraft. There were three dead and 23 survivors.
Mount Helmos	Greece	World War II: The cargo ship was torpedoed, shelled and sunk in the Indian Ocean (26°38′S 34°59′E) by U-181 ( Kriegsmarine) with the loss of one of her 34 crew.
Nathaniel Bacon	United States	The Liberty ship collided with Esso Belgium (Belgium) in New York Harbor and was beached. She was later repaired and returned to service.
Shusha	Soviet Navy	The minesweeper foundered in the Barents Sea off the Kola Peninsula.
Trentbank	United Kingdom	World War II: Convoy KMS 3: The cargo ship was sunk in the Mediterranean Sea 10 nautical miles (19 km) north of Cape Ténès, Algeria by Luftwaffe aircraft with the loss of two of her 77 crew.

== 25 November ==
List of shipwrecks: 25 November 1942
Ship	State	Description
V 1514 Beuthen	Kriegsmarine	World War II: The Vorpostenboot struck a mine and sank in the English Channel off Dieppe, Seine-Inférieure, France with the loss of five lives.
Erika Hendrik Fisser	Germany	World War II: The cargo ship was struck by an air-launched torpedo and sank off the Oksøy Lighthouse, Norway with the loss of 46 of her 50 crew.
V 281 L’Eroe di Caprera	Regia Marina	World War II: The schooner/auxiliary patrol vessel was sunk by a mine in the Mediterranean Sea off Levanzo (38°08′N 12°20′E). There were four survivors.
HMT Leyland	Royal Navy	The naval trawler was lost in a collision off Gibraltar.
M-101	Kriegsmarine	The Type 1935 minesweeper was sunk in a collision with Levante (Germany) off Roan, Norway. Thirteen of her crew were lost.
HMS Utmost	Royal Navy	World War II: The U-class submarine was depth charged and sunk in the Mediterranean Sea off Malta by Groppo (Regia Marina).

== 26 November ==
List of shipwrecks: 26 November 1942
Ship	State	Description
Algerino	Italy	World War II: The cargo ship was bombed and sunk at Zliten, Libya by Allied aircraft. There were no casualties.
Barberrys	United Kingdom	World War II: Convoy SC 110: The cargo ship was torpedoed and sunk in the Atlantic Ocean (50°36′N 47°10′W) by U-663 ( Kriegsmarine) with the loss of 32 of the 53 people on board. Survivors were rescued by USCGC Mohawk ( United States Coast Guard).
Cheribon Maru	Imperial Japanese Army	World War II: The Samarang Maru-class transport ship was bombed and set on fire in the west arm of Holtz Bay on the coast of Attu Island, Territory of Alaska (52°45′N 173°15′E) by Martin B-26 Marauder aircraft of the United States Army Air Force. Fifteen seamen and six ship's gunners were killed. She capsized and sank in 100 feet (30 m) of water on 14 December.
Clan Macfadyen	United Kingdom	World War II: The cargo ship (6,191 GRT) was torpedoed and sunk in the Atlantic Ocean 95 nautical miles (176 km) north east of Galeota Point, Trinidad (8°57′N 59°48′W) by U-508 ( Kriegsmarine) with the loss of 89 lives (82 crew and 7 gunners). Four survivors were rescued by Harvard ( United Kingdom) and 6 other reached Trinided in a raft.
Deep Sea	United States	The cargo ship was wrecked at Anchorage, Territory of Alaska.
Indra	Norway	World War II: The cargo ship was torpedoed and sunk in the Atlantic Ocean (2°10′N 28°52′W) by UD-3 ( Kriegsmarine). Her 39 crew were rescued by Eurybates ( United Kingdom).
Ocean Crusader	United Kingdom	World War II: Convoy HX 216: The Ocean ship straggled behind the convoy. She was torpedoed and sunk in the Atlantic Ocean (50°30′N 45°30′W) by U-262 ( Kriegsmarine) with the loss of all 49 crew.
R 109	Kriegsmarine	World War II: The minesweeper struck a mine and sank in the English Channel off Fécamp, Seine-Inférieure, France.

== 27 November ==
List of shipwrecks: 27 November 1942
Ship	State	Description
Achéron	French Navy	World War II: Scuttling of the French fleet in Toulon: The Redoutable-class submarine was scuttled at Toulon, Var.
L'Adroit	French Navy	World War II: Scuttling of the French fleet in Toulon: The Le Hardi-class destroyer was scuttled at Toulon. She was later salvaged and repaired by the Regia Marina and designated FR 33.
Aigle	French Navy	World War II: Scuttling of the French fleet in Toulon: The Aigle-class destroyer was scuttled at Toulon. The wreck was later salvaged and scrapped.
Algérie	French Navy	World War II: Scuttling of the French fleet in Toulon: The cruiser was scuttled at Toulon. The wreck was later salvaged and scrapped.
Aurore	French Navy	World War II: Scuttling of the French fleet in Toulon: The Aurore-class submarine was scuttled at Toulon.
Baliste	French Navy	World War II: Scuttling of the French fleet in Toulon: The La Melpomène-class torpedo boat was scuttled at Toulon. She was later salvaged and repaired by the Regia Marina. Later taken into Kriegsmarine service as TA12.
Blairatholl	United Kingdom	World War II: Convoy SC 110: The cargo ship collided with John Bakke (Norway) in the Atlantic Ocean on 26 November and sank in the early hours of the next day (51°25′N 48°20′E). Thirty-four crew and three gunners were lost. There were probably no survivors.
Bordelais	French Navy	World War II: Scuttling of the French fleet in Toulon: The L'Adroit-class destroyer was scuttled at Toulon. She was salvaged and scrapped by the Germans.
C-25	French Navy	World War II: Scuttling of the French fleet in Toulon: The SC-1-class submarine chaser was scuttled at Toulon.
Caiman	French Navy	World War II: Scuttling of the French fleet in Toulon: The Requin-class submarine was scuttled at Toulon. She was later salvaged.
Cap Noir	(France) Vichy French Navy	World War II: The auxiliary minesweeper was lost on this date.
Casque	French Navy	World War II: Scuttling of the French fleet in Toulon: The Le Hardi-class destroyer was scuttled at Toulon.
Cassard	French Navy	World War II: Scuttling of the French fleet in Toulon: The Vauquelin-class destroyer was scuttled at Toulon.
CH-1	French Navy	World War II: Scuttling of the French fleet in Toulon: The SC-1-class submarine chaser was scuttled at Toulon. She was raised by the Regia Marina, and was subsequently captured by the Germans.
CH-4	French Navy	World War II: Scuttling of the French fleet in Toulon: The SC-1-class submarine chaser was scuttled at Toulon. She was raised by the Regia Marina, captured by the Germans and put into service as UJ 6077.
Chamois	French Navy	World War II: Scuttling of the French fleet in Toulon: The Chamois-class minesweeper was scuttled at Toulon. She was later salvaged and repaired by the Regia Marina.
Circe	Regia Marina	World War II: The Spica-class torpedo boat was sunk in a collision with Città di Napoli (Italy) north of Sicily (38°14′N 12°27′E). Sixty-six of her crew were killed and 99 survived.
Colbert	French Navy	Colbert World War II: Scuttling of the French fleet in Toulon: The cruiser was scuttled at Toulon.
Commandant Teste	French Navy	World War II: Scuttling of the French fleet in Toulon: The seaplane carrier and tender was scuttled at Toulon. The wreck was later raised and scrapped.
Curieuse	French Navy	World War II: Scuttling of the French fleet in Toulon: The Elan-class minesweeper was scuttled at Toulon. She was later salvaged and repaired by the Regia Marina.
Dédaigneuse	French Navy	World War II: Scuttling of the French fleet in Toulon: The Ardent-class gunboat was scuttled at Toulon. She was later salvaged and repaired by the Regia Marina and entered service as FR 56.
Diamant	French Navy	World War II: Scuttling of the French fleet in Toulon: The Saphir-class submarine was scuttled at Toulon.
D'Iberville	French Navy	World War II: Scuttling of the French fleet in Toulon: The Bougainville-class aviso was scuttled at Toulon.
Dunkerque	French Navy	World War II: Scuttling of the French fleet in Toulon: The Dunkerque-class battleship was scuttled at Toulon.
Dupleix	French Navy	World War II: Scuttling of the French fleet in Toulon: The Suffren-class cruiser was scuttled at Toulon. The wreck was later raised.
Espoir	French Navy	World War II: Scuttling of the French fleet in Toulon: The Redoutable-class submarine was scuttled at Toulon.
Eurydice	French Navy	World War II: Scuttling of the French fleet in Toulon: The Ariane-class submarine was scuttled at Toulon. She was later salvaged and repaired by the Regia Marina.
Foch	French Navy	World War II: Scuttling of the French fleet in Toulon: The Suffren-class cruiser was scuttled at Toulon. The wreck was later salvaged and scrapped.
Foudroyant	French Navy	Foudroyant (centre left) World War II: Scuttling of the French fleet in Toulon: The Le Hardi-class destroyer was scuttled at Toulon. She was later salvaged and repaired by the Regia Marina, designated FR 36.
Fresnel	French Navy	World War II: Scuttling of the French fleet in Toulon: The Redoutable-class submarine was scuttled at Toulon.
Galatée	French Navy	World War II: Scuttling of the French fleet in Toulon: The Sirène-class submarine was scuttled at Toulon.
Gerfaut	French Navy	World War II: Scuttling of the French fleet in Toulon: The Aigle-class destroyer was scuttled at Toulon.
Gladiateur	French Navy	World War II: Scuttling of the French fleet in Toulon: The net layer was scuttled at Toulon. She was salvaged by the Germans in March 1943, and pressed into Kriegsmarine service as anti-aircraft corvette SG 18 in January 1944.
Granit	French Navy	World War II: Scuttling of the French fleet in Toulon: The Granit-class minesweeper was scuttled at Toulon. She was later salvaged and repaired by the Regia Marina, put in Kriegsmarine service as SG 26.
Guépard	French Navy	World War II: Scuttling of the French fleet in Toulon: The Guépard-class destroyer (2,398/3,170 t, 1929) was scuttled at Toulon. The wreck was later salvaged and scrapped.
Le Hardi	French Navy	Le Hardi (centre right) World War II: Scuttling of the French fleet in Toulon: The Le Hardi-class destroyer was scuttled at Toulon.
Harvesthude	Germany	World War II: The cargo ship was torpedoed by HNoMS MTB 620 (Royal Norwegian Navy) at Askvoll, near Bergen, Norway, and was beached.
Henri Poincaré	French Navy	World War II: Scuttling of the French fleet in Toulon: The Redoutable-class submarine was scuttled at Toulon.
Heron II	(France) Vichy French Navy	World War II: Scuttling of the French fleet in Toulon: The Pluvier-class patrol tugboat was scuttled at Toulon. She was raised post-war and scrapped.
Hertha	Norway	World War II: The cargo ship was torpedoed by HNoMS MTB 623 (Royal Norwegian Navy) at Askvoll, near Bergen and was beached. She was raised and repaired in 1943.
Jean de Vienne	French Navy	World War II: Scuttling of the French fleet in Toulon: The La Galissonnière-class cruiser was scuttled at Toulon. The wreck was later salvaged and scrapped.
Jeremiah Wadsworth	United States	World War II: The Liberty ship (7,176 GRT) was torpedoed and sunk in the Indian Ocean off the coast of the Union of South Africa (39°25′S 22°23′E) by U-178 ( Kriegsmarine). The whole crew (eight officers, 35 crewmen and 14 armed guards) survived. Nineteen survivors are rescued by John Lykes ( United States) and twenty by another ship on 5 December. A further eighteen survivors were rescued by HMS Alcantara (Royal Navy) the next day.
Kachosan Maru	Imperial Japanese Army	World War II: The cargo ship was sunk at Attu Island, Territory of Alaska by United States Army Air Force aircraft.
Kersaint	French Navy	Kersaint (right) World War II: Scuttling of the French fleet in Toulon: The Vauquelin-class destroyer was scuttled at Toulon.
La Bayonnaise	French Navy	World War II: Scuttling of the French fleet in Toulon: The La Melpomène-class torpedo boat was scuttled at Toulon. She was later salvaged and repaired by the Regia Marina.
La Galissonnière	French Navy	World War II: Scuttling of the French fleet in Toulon: The La Galissonnière-class cruiser was scuttled at Toulon. The wreck was later salvaged and scrapped.
La Havraise	(France) Vichy French Navy	World War II: The auxiliary patrol vessel/naval trawler was scuttled, probably at Toulon. She was salvaged by the Germans in 1943, and put into service as UJ 6078.
Lansquenet	French Navy	Lansquenet World War II: Scuttling of the French fleet in Toulon: The Le Hardi-class destroyer was scuttled at Toulon. She was later salvaged and repaired by the Regia Marina, and entered service as FR 34.
La Poursuivante	French Navy	World War II: Scuttling of the French fleet in Toulon: The La Melpomène-class torpedo boat was scuttled at Toulon. She was later salvaged and repaired by the Regia Marina.
Les Eparges	French Navy	World War II: Scuttling of the French fleet in Toulon: The Arras-class gunboat was scuttled at Toulon. She was raised by the Regia Marina, captured by the Germans and put in Kriegsmarine service as M 6060.
L'Impetueuse	French Navy	World War II: Scuttling of the French fleet in Toulon: The Elan-class minesweeper was scuttled at Toulon.
Lion	French Navy	World War II: Scuttling of the French fleet in Toulon: The Guépard-class destroyer was scuttled at Toulon. She was later salvaged and repaired by the Regia Marina, and entered service as FR 21.
Loup	(France) Vichy French Navy	World War II: Scuttling of the French fleet in Toulon: The Loup-class patrol tugboat was scuttled at Toulon. She was later raised by the Germans.
Lynx	French Navy	World War II: Scuttling of the French fleet in Toulon: The Chacal-class destroyer was scuttled at Toulon. The wreck was later salvaged. It was scrapped by the Germans in 1944.
Maj	Sweden	World War II: The coaster struck a mine and sank in the Baltic Sea off Swinemünde, Germany with the loss of one of her eight crew.
Mameluk	French Navy	World War II: Scuttling of the French fleet in Toulon: The Le Hardi-class destroyer was scuttled at Toulon.
Marcassin	(France) Vichy French Navy	World War II: Scuttling of the French fleet in Toulon: The Loup-class patrol tugboat was scuttled at Toulon. She was later raised by the Germans.
Mars	French Navy	Mars World War II: Scuttling of the French fleet in Toulon: The L'Adroit-class destroyer was scuttled at Toulon. She was salvaged and scrapped by the Germans.
Marseillaise	French Navy	World War II: Scuttling of the French fleet in Toulon: The La Galissonnière-class cruiser was scuttled at Toulon. The wreck was later salvaged and scrapped.
Mogador	French Navy	World War II: Scuttling of the French fleet in Toulon: The Mogador-class destroyer was scuttled at Toulon. The wreck was later salvaged and scrapped.
Naïade	French Navy	World War II: Scuttling of the French fleet in Toulon: The Sirène-class submarine was scuttled at Toulon.
Palme	French Navy	World War II: Scuttling of the French fleet in Toulon: The L'Adroit-class destroyer was scuttled at Toulon. She was salvaged and scrapped by the Germans.
Panthère	French Navy	World War II: Scuttling of the French fleet in Toulon: The Chacal-class destroyer was scuttled at Toulon. She was later salvaged and repaired by the Regia Marina, entering service as FR 22.
Pascal	French Navy	World War II: Scuttling of the French fleet in Toulon: The Redoutable-class submarine was scuttled at Toulon.
Polydorus	Netherlands	World War II: The cargo ship (5,922 GRT) was torpedoed and sunk in the Atlantic Ocean north west of Freetown, Sierra Leone (9°01′N 25°38′W) by U-176 ( Kriegsmarine) with the loss of one of her 81 crew. Survivors were rescued by Eolo (Spain).
Provence	French Navy	World War II: Scuttling of the French fleet in Toulon: The Bretagne-class battleship was scuttled at Toulon. The wreck was later raised.
Redoutable	French Navy	World War II: Scuttling of the French fleet in Toulon: The Redoutable-class submarine was scuttled at Toulon.
Roche Bleue	(France) Vichy French Navy	The auxiliary minesweeper was lost on this date.
Roche Francoise	(France) Vichy French Navy	The auxiliary minesweeper was lost on this date.
Sirène	French Navy	World War II: Scuttling of the French fleet in Toulon: The Sirène-class submarine was scuttled at Toulon.
Siroco	French Navy	World War II: Scuttling of the French fleet in Toulon: The Le Hardi-class destroyer was scuttled at Toulon. She was later salvaged and repaired by the Regia Marina, and entered service as FR 32.
Strasbourg	French Navy	Strasbourg World War II: Scuttling of the French fleet in Toulon: The Dunkerque-class battleship was scuttled at Toulon. The wreck was later raised and scrapped.
Szechuen	United Kingdom	The cargo ship suffered an explosion and sank off Port Said, Egypt. The cause was probably sabotage.
Tartu	French Navy	Tartu World War II: Scuttling of the French fleet in Toulon: The Vauquelin-class destroyer was scuttled at Toulon.
Thétis	French Navy	World War II: Scuttling of the French fleet in Toulon: The Circé-class submarine was scuttled at Toulon. She was later salvaged and scrapped.
Tigre	French Navy	World War II: Scuttling of the French fleet in Toulon: The Chacal-class destroyer was scuttled at Toulon. She was later salvaged, repaired, and put in service by the Regia Marina as FR 23.
Trombe	French Navy	World War II: Scuttling of the French fleet in Toulon: The Bourrasque-class destroyer was scuttled at Toulon. She was later salvaged and repaired by the Regia Marina, and entered service as FR 31.
Valmy	French Navy	World War II: Scuttling of the French fleet in Toulon: The Guépard-class destroyer was scuttled at Toulon. She was later salvaged and repaired by the Regia Marina, and entered service as FR 24.
Vauban	French Navy	World War II: Scuttling of the French fleet in Toulon: The Guépard-class destroyer was scuttled at Toulon. The wreck was later salvaged and scrapped.
Vauquelin	French Navy	Vauquelin (left) World War II: Scuttling of the French fleet in Toulon: The Vauquelin-class destroyer was scuttled at Toulon.
Vautour	French Navy	World War II: Scuttling of the French fleet in Toulon: The Aigle-class destroyer was scuttled at Toulon. The wreck was later salvaged and scrapped.
Vengeur	French Navy	World War II: Scuttling of the French fleet in Toulon: The Redoutable-class submarine was scuttled at Toulon.
Vénus	French Navy	World War II: Scuttling of the French fleet in Toulon: The Minerve-class submarine was scuttled at Toulon.
Verdun	French Navy	World War II: Scuttling of the French fleet in Toulon: The Guépard-class destroyer was scuttled at Toulon. The wreck was later salvaged and scrapped.
Yser	French Navy	World War II: Scuttling of the French fleet in Toulon: The Somme-class gunboat was scuttled at Toulon. She was later salvaged and repaired by the Regia Marina.

== 28 November ==
List of shipwrecks: 28 November 1942
Ship	State	Description
Alaskan	United States	World War II: The cargo ship was torpedoed and sunk in the Atlantic Ocean 800 nautical miles (1,500 km; 920 mi) northeast of Natal, Brazil (3°58′N 26°19′W) by U-172 ( Kriegsmarine) with the loss of seven of her 58 crew. Three gunners and eleven crewmen were rescued by Cilurnum (Spain) on 13 December. Twelve gunners and seventeen crewmen sailed a lifeboat to Salinas, Minas Gerais, Brazil, arriving 15 December. Nine other survivors sailed via lifeboat to French Guiana, arriving on 5 January 1943.
USS Alchiba	United States Navy	World War II: The Arcturus-class attack cargo ship was torpedoed and damaged in the Pacific Ocean off Lunga Point, Guadalcanal, Solomon Islands by Ha-10 ( Imperial Japanese Navy). She was beached and salvage operations were commenced. On 7 December, she was again torpedoed and damaged by Ha-38 ( Imperial Japanese Navy) with the loss of three crew. She was subsequently repaired and returned to service.
Città di Napoli	Regia Marina	World War II: The armed merchant cruiser struck a mine and sank in the Tyrrhenian Sea off the Aeolian Islands with the loss of one life.
Dessiè	Regia Marina	World War II: The Adua-class submarine was depth charged and sunk in the Mediterranean Sea north of Bône, Algeria (37°48′N 02°14′E) by HMS Quentin (Royal Navy) and HMAS Quiberon (Royal Australian Navy). All 48 of her crew were killed.
Empire Cromwell	United Kingdom	World War II: The cargo ship was torpedoed and sunk in the Atlantic Ocean 160 nautical miles (300 km; 180 mi) southeast of Trinidad by U-508 ( Kriegsmarine) with the loss of 24 of her 49 crew. Survivors were rescued by Royal Navy motor torpedo boats.
Evanthia	Greece	World War II: The cargo ship was torpedoed, shelled and sunk in the Indian Ocean off Lourenço Marques, Portuguese East Africa (25°13′S 34°00′E) by U-181 ( Kriegsmarine). Her 32 crew survived.
Ha-10	Imperial Japanese Navy	World War II: The midget submarine was lost with both crew after torpedoing USS Alchiba ( United States Navy) off Lunga Point.
HMS Ithuriel	Royal Navy	World War II: The I-class destroyer was bombed and damaged beyond repair at Bône by Luftwaffe aircraft on the night of 27/28 November. She was beached on 29 November. Partially repaired, refloated, and towed to Gibraltar in February 1943 where she was used as an accommodation and training ship. She was towed to Plymouth, Devon in 1944. Ithuriel was scrapped post-war.
Kiungchow	United Kingdom	The tanker caught fire at Tobruk, Libya and was scuttled. She was later refloated, repaired and returned to service.
RMS Nova Scotia	United Kingdom	World War II: The troop ship was torpedoed and sunk in the Indian Ocean off the coast of the Natal Province, Union of South Africa (28°30′S 33°00′E) by U-177 ( Kriegsmarine) with the loss of 858 of the 1,052 people aboard. Survivors were rescued by NRP Afonso de Albuquerque (Portuguese Navy).
Ramses	Kriegsmarine	World War II: The cargo ship was intercepted in the Indian Ocean by HMAS Adelaide (Royal Australian Navy) and HNLMS Jacob van Heemskerck (Royal Netherlands Navy) and was scuttled by her crew, and shelled by the cruisers. Jacob van Heemskerck rescued 78 German crewmen and ten Finnish passengers.
Selbo	Norway	World War II: The cargo ship was torpedoed and sunk in the Mediterranean Sea 15 nautical miles (28 km; 17 mi) north of Cape Cavallo, Sardinia, Italy by Regia Aeronautica aircraft. The convoy was attacked by three S.79 aircraft from 131° Gruppo (Marini, Di Bella, Terzi) and three from 132° Gruppo (Graziani, Pfister and Aichner). This caused the loss of thirteen of her 28 crew. Some of the survivors were rescued by HMT Lord Nuffield (Royal Navy), others reached land in their lifeboat.
Thomas T. Tucker	United States	Thomas T. Tucker, June 2006 World War II: The Liberty ship came ashore at Olifants Bosch Point, Union of South Africa (34°16′S 18°23′E) and broke in three, a total loss. Her crew survived.

== 29 November ==
List of shipwrecks: 29 November 1942
Ship	State	Description
Akka	Kriegsmarine	World War II: The cargo ship was damaged by a mine and beached off Varangerfjord. She was later salvaged and returned to service.
Argo	Greece	World War II: The cargo ship was torpedoed and sunk in the Mediterranean Sea (34°53′S 17°54′E) by Ammiraglio Cagni (Regia Marina) with the loss of eighteen of the 36 people on board.
RFA Dewdale	Royal Fleet Auxiliary	World War II: The landing ship, gantry was damaged by a mine at Algiers, Algeria. She was subsequently repaired and returned to service.
Dunedin Star	United Kingdom	After striking an underwater obstacle, the refrigerated cargo liner was beached and wrecked on the Skeleton Coast of South-West Africa. Her 85 crewmen and 21 passengers were eventually rescued, but during rescue operation an aircraft, a tug and two of the tug's crew were lost.
Fukken Maru	Japan	World War II: The cargo ship struck a mine and sank in the Gulf of Tonkin north west of Hainan, China.
Sirio	Italy	World War II: The cargo ship was bombed and sunk at Tripoli, Libya in an Allied air raid.
Sawokla	United States	World War II: The cargo ship was shelled, torpedoed and sunk in the Indian Ocean 400 nautical miles (740 km) south east of Madagascar (28°00′S 54°00′E) by Michel ( Kriegsmarine). Four gunners and sixteen crewmen were killed. five passengers, five gunners, and 25 crewmen were rescued by Michel. She rescued four more gunners the next day. Survivors were later turned over to the Japanese as prisoners of war.
Tjileboet	Netherlands	World War II: The cargo ship was torpedoed and sunk in the Atlantic Ocean 5°34′N 25°02′W) by U-161 ( Kriegsmarine) with the loss of all 62 crew.

== 30 November ==
List of shipwrecks: 30 November 1942
Ship	State	Description
Canton	France	World War II: The cargo ship struck a mine laid by USS Tautog (United States Navy) and sank off Cape Padaran, French Indochina (11°10′N 108°47′E). Two of her crew were killed.
Cleanthis	Greece	World War II: The cargo ship was torpedoed, shelled and sunk in the Indian Ocean off the coast of Portuguese Mozambique (24°29′S 35°44′E) by U-181 (Kriegsmarine) with the loss of twelve of her 34 crew. On 2 December Lourenço Marques (Portugal) rescued 22 survivors.
Dirschau	Germany	World War II: The cargo ship was sunk by a mine in the Baltic Sea.
Hans Rickmers	Germany	World War II: The cargo ship struck a mine off Petsamo, Finland, and was beached. The wreck was then shelled and destroyed by Soviet coastal guns. Her crew lost three killed and eleven wounded.
Leuthen	Germany	The cargo ship was destroyed by the accidental explosion and fire of Uckermark (Kriegsmarine) at Yokohama, Japan.
Llandaff Castle	United Kingdom	World War II: The troopship was torpedoed and sunk in the Indian Ocean south east of Lourenço Marques (27°20′S 33°40′E) by U-177 (Kriegsmarine) with the loss of three of the 313 people on board. Survivors were rescued by HMS Catterick (Royal Navy).
USS Northampton	United States Navy	World War II: Battle of Tassafaronga: The Northampton-class cruiser was torpedoed and sunk in Ironbottom Sound by Imperial Japanese Navy destroyers. She sank in the early hours of 1 December.
HMCS Quinte	Royal Canadian Navy	The Bangor-class minesweeper ran aground and sank at entrance to St. Peter's Canal, Cape Breton Island, Nova Scotia.
Takanami	Imperial Japanese Navy	World War II: Battle of Tassafaronga: The Yūgumo-class destroyer was shelled and sunk in Ironbottom Sound south east of Savo Island, Solomon Islands (9°14′S 159°49′E) by USS Minneapolis ( United States Navy) with the loss of 197 of her 228 crew. She sank in the early hours of 1 December.
Teresa Odero	Italy	World War II: The cargo ship was scuttled at Puerto Cabello, Venezuela. She was later refloated and repaired, entering Argentinian service in 1944 as Quilmes.
Thor	Kriegsmarine	The auxiliary cruiser (3,862 GRT, 1939) was destroyed by the accidental explosion and fire of Uckermark (Kriegsmarine) at Yokohama. Twelve of her crew were killed.
Uckermark	Kriegsmarine	The tanker was destroyed by an accidental explosion at Yokohama. Fifty-three of her crew were killed.
Unkai Maru No. 3	Imperial Japanese Navy	The Unkai Maru No. 3-class auxiliary storeship was destroyed by the accidental explosion and fire of Uckermark (Kriegsmarine) at Yokohama, Japan. A crew member was killed.
Westsee	Germany	World War II: The cargo ship (5,911 GRT) struck a mine off Petsamo and was beached. The wreck was then shelled and destroyed by Soviet coastal guns. Her crew lost nine killed and 15 wounded.

== Unknown date ==
List of shipwrecks: Unknown date 1942
Ship	State	Description
Belgien	Vichy France	World War II: The cargo ship was scuttled at Port Lyautey, Morocco. She was salvaged, repaired and entered British service in 1943.
Cyril	Vichy France	The cargo ship was scuttled at Port Lyautey. She was refloated in January 1943. Subsequently repaired, and returned to Danish service in 1945.
Essex	United Kingdom	World War II: The ocean liner (13,655) was bombed and severely damaged at Malta. She was salvaged in 1945, towed to the United Kingdom, repaired and returned to service.
I-172	Imperial Japanese Navy	The Kaidai VIa type submarine sank off Guadalcanal, Solomon Islands on or after 3 November from unknown causes. Lost with all 91 hands.
Koutoubria	France	World War II: The armed merchant cruiser was attacked and sunk off Bône, Algeria by Axis aircraft. She was refloated in 1944, repaired and returned to service in 1946.
HMS LCM 63	Royal Navy	The Landing Craft, Mechanized was lost sometime in November.
HMS LCM 64	Royal Navy	The Landing Craft, Mechanized was lost sometime in November.
HMS LCM 65	Royal Navy	The Landing Craft, Mechanized was lost sometime in November..
HMS LCM 69	Royal Navy	The Landing Craft, Mechanized was lost sometime in November.
HMS LCM 72	Royal Navy	The Landing Craft, Mechanized was lost sometime in November.
HMS LCM 73	Royal Navy	The Landing Craft, Mechanized was lost sometime in November.
HMS LCM 100	Royal Navy	The Landing Craft, Mechanized was lost sometime in November.
HMS LCM 147	Royal Navy	The Landing Craft, Mechanized was lost sometime in November.
HMS LCM 153	Royal Navy	The Landing Craft, Mechanized was lost sometime in November.
HMS LCM 161	Royal Navy	TheLanding Craft, Mechanized was lost sometime in November.
HMS LCM 169	Royal Navy	The Landing Craft, Mechanized was lost sometime in November.
HMS LCM 186	Royal Navy	The Landing Craft, Mechanized was lost sometime in November.
HMS LCM 518	Royal Navy	The Landing Craft, Mechanized was lost sometime in November.
HMS LCM 520	Royal Navy	TheLanding Craft, Mechanized was lost sometime in November.
HMS LCM 528	Royal Navy	The Landing Craft, Mechanized was lost sometime in November.
HMS LCM 539	Royal Navy	The Landing Craft, Mechanized was lost sometime in November.
HMS LCM 543	Royal Navy	The Landing Craft, Mechanized was lost sometime in November.
HMS LCM 551	Royal Navy	The Landing Craft, Mechanized was lost sometime in November.
HMS LCM 555	Royal Navy	The Landing Craft, Mechanized was lost sometime in November.
HMS LCM 556	Royal Navy	The Landing Craft, Mechanized was lost sometime in November.
HMS LCM 558	Royal Navy	The Landing Craft, Mechanized was lost sometime in November.
HMS LCM 564	Royal Navy	The Landing Craft, Mechanized was lost sometime in November.
HMS LCM 596	Royal Navy	The Landing Craft, Mechanized was lost sometime in November.
HMS LCM 606	Royal Navy	The Landing Craft, Mechanized was lost sometime in November.
HMS LCM 609	Royal Navy	The Landing Craft, Mechanized was lost sometime in November.
HMS LCM 624	Royal Navy	The Landing Craft, Mechanized was lost sometime in November.
HMS LCM 635	Royal Navy	The Landing Craft, Mechanized was lost sometime in November.
HMS LCP(L) 138	Royal Navy	The Landing Craft Personnel (Large) was lost some time in November.
HMS LCP(L) 507	Royal Navy	The Landing Craft Personnel (Large) was lost some time in November.
HMS LCP(L) 543	Royal Navy	The Landing Craft Personnel (Large) was lost some time in November.
HMS LCP(L) 544	Royal Navy	The Landing Craft Personnel (Large) was lost some time in November.
HMS LCP(L) 550	Royal Navy	The Landing Craft Personnel (Large) was lost some time in November.
HMS LCP(L) 560	Royal Navy	The Landing Craft Personnel (Large) was lost some time in November.
HMS LCP(L) 562	Royal Navy	The Landing Craft Personnel (Large) was lost some time in November.
HMS LCP(L) 565	Royal Navy	The Landing Craft Personnel (Large) was lost some time in November.
HMS LCP(L) 566	Royal Navy	The Landing Craft Personnel (Large) was lost some time in November.
HMS LCP(L) 568	Royal Navy	The Landing Craft Personnel (Large) was lost some time in November.
HMS LCP(L) 573	Royal Navy	The Landing Craft Personnel (Large) was lost some time in November.
HMS LCP(L) 575	Royal Navy	The Landing Craft Personnel (Large) was lost some time in November.
HMS LCP(L) 576	Royal Navy	The Landing Craft Personnel (Large) was lost some time in November.
HMS LCP(L) 579	Royal Navy	The Landing Craft Personnel (Large) was lost some time in November.
HMS LCP(R) 603	Royal Navy	The Landing Craft Personnel (Large) was lost some time in November.
HMS LCP(R) 620	Royal Navy	The Landing Craft Personnel (Large) was lost some time in November.
HMS LCP(R) 629	Royal Navy	The Landing Craft Personnel (Large) was lost some time in November.
HMS LCP(R) 721	Royal Navy	TheLanding Craft Personnel (Large) was lost some time in November.
HMS LCP(R) 783	Royal Navy	The Landing Craft Personnel (Large) was lost some time in November.
HMS LCP(R) 794	Royal Navy	The Landing Craft Personnel (Large) was lost some time in November.
HMS LCP(R) 837	Royal Navy	The Landing Craft Personnel (Large) was lost some time in November.
HMS LCP(R) 850	Royal Navy	The Landing Craft Personnel (Large) was lost some time in November.
HMS LCP(R) 858	Royal Navy	The Landing Craft Personnel (Large) was lost some time in November.
HMS LCP(R) 901	Royal Navy	The Landing Craft Personnel (Large) was lost some time in November.
HMS LCP(R) 909	Royal Navy	The Landing Craft Personnel (Large) was lost some time in November.
HMS LCP(R) 1009	Royal Navy	The Landing Craft Personnel (Large) was lost some time in November.
HMS LCP(R) 1029	Royal Navy	The Landing Craft Personnel (Large) was lost some time in November.
HMS LCP(R) 1036,	Royal Navy	The Landing Craft Personnel (Large) was lost some time in November.
HMS LCT 2187	Royal Navy	World War II: The LCT-1-class landing craft tank was lost in transit from the United States to the United Kingdom, probably as cargo on a ship.
M-121	Soviet Navy	World War II: The M-class submarine was sunk by a mine in Varangerfjord between 8 and 14 November.
Menhir Bras	France	World War II: The cargo ship was scuttled at Oran, Algeria. She was refloated in November 1943 but was not repaired. She was scrapped in 1950.
Nyhorn	Vichy France	World War II: The cargo ship was scuttled at Port Lyautey. She was refloated in 1943 and returned to Norwegian service.
Saint Benoit	Vichy France	World War II: The cargo ship was scuttled at Port Lyautey. She was refloated in 1943 and repaired.
Saint Edmond	Vichy France	World War II: The cargo ship was scuttled at Port Lyautey. She was refloated in January 1943, repaired and returned to service.
Shch-304	Soviet Navy	The Shchuka-class submarine was lost between 29 October and mid-November in the Gulf of Finland.
Shch-306	Soviet Navy	The Baltic Fleet Shchuka-class submarine was lost in the Gulf of Finland after 12 November.
Sibylle	(France) Vichy French Navy	World War II: The Diane-class submarine was lost after leaving Casablanca, Morocco on 8 November.
Ste Jacqueline	Vichy France	World War II: The cargo ship was scuttled at Port Lyautey. She was refloated in January 1943, repaired and entered British service.
U-184	Kriegsmarine	The Type IXC/40 submarine disappeared in the Atlantic Ocean sometime after 17 November with the loss of all 50 crew. Cause unknown.
