= German submarine U-184 =

Missing German World War II submarine

History

Nazi Germany
- Name: U-184
- Ordered: 15 August 1940
- Builder: DeSchiMAG AG Weser, Bremen
- Yard number: 1024
- Laid down: 10 June 1941
- Launched: 21 February 1942
- Commissioned: 29 May 1942
- Fate: Missing since 21 November 1942

General characteristics
- Class & type: Type IXC/40 submarine
- Displacement: 1,144 t (1,126 long tons) surfaced; 1,257 t (1,237 long tons) submerged
- Length: 76.76 m (251 ft 10 in) o/a; 58.75 m (192 ft 9 in) pressure hull
- Beam: 6.86 m (22 ft 6 in) o/a; 4.44 m (14 ft 7 in) pressure hull
- Height: 9.60 m (31 ft 6 in)
- Draught: 4.67 m (15 ft 4 in)
- Installed power: 4,400 PS (3,200 kW; 4,300 bhp) (diesels); 1,000 PS (740 kW; 990 shp) (electric)
- Propulsion: 2 shafts; 2 × diesel engines; 2 × electric motors
- Speed: 18.3 knots (33.9 km/h; 21.1 mph) surfaced; 7.3 knots (13.5 km/h; 8.4 mph) submerged
- Range: 13,850 nmi (25,650 km; 15,940 mi) at 10 knots (19 km/h; 12 mph) surfaced; 63 nmi (117 km; 72 mi) at 4 knots (7.4 km/h; 4.6 mph) submerged
- Test depth: 230 m (750 ft)
- Complement: 4 officers, 44 enlisted
- Armament: 6 × torpedo tubes (4 bow, 2 stern); 22 × 53.3 cm (21 in) torpedoes; 1 × 10.5 cm (4.1 in) SK C/32 deck gun (180 rounds); 1 × 3.7 cm (1.5 in) SK C/30 AA gun; 1 × twin 2 cm FlaK 30 AA guns

Service record
- Part of: 4th U-boat Flotilla; 29 May – 31 October 1942; 2nd U-boat Flotilla; 1 – 21 November 1942
- Identification codes: M 45 477
- Commanders: Kptlt. Günther Dangschat; 29 May – 21 November 1942
- Operations: 1 patrol: 9 – 21 November 1942
- Victories: 1 merchant ship sunk (3,192 GRT)

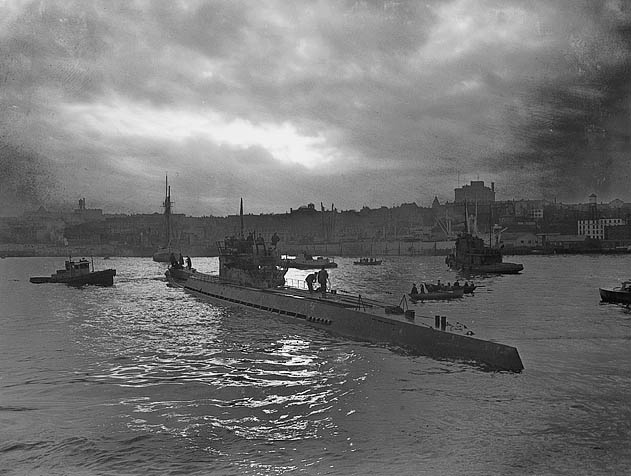
German submarine U-190 in St. John’s Newfoundland in June 1945

German submarine U-184 was a Type IXC/40 U-boat of Nazi Germany's Kriegsmarine built for service during World War II.

She was ordered on 15 August 1940 and was laid down on 10 June 1941 at DeSchiMAG AG Weser, Bremen, becoming yard number 1024. She was launched on 21 February 1942 and commissioned under her first and only commander Kapitänleutnant Günther Dangschat on 29 May. After a period of training with the 4th U-boat Flotilla, she joined the 2nd U-boat Flotilla for operational service on 1 November 1942.

== Design ==
German Type IXC/40 submarines were slightly larger than the original Type IXCs. U-184 had a displacement of 1,144 tonnes (1,126 long tons) when at the surface and 1,257 tonnes (1,237 long tons) while submerged. The U-boat had a total length of 76.76 m (251 ft 10 in), a pressure hull length of 58.75 m (192 ft 9 in), a beam of 6.86 m (22 ft 6 in), a height of 9.60 m (31 ft 6 in), and a draught of 4.67 m (15 ft 4 in). The submarine was powered by two MAN M 9 V 40/46 supercharged four-stroke, nine-cylinder diesel engines producing a total of 4,400 metric horsepower (3,240 kW; 4,340 shp) for use while surfaced, two Siemens-Schuckert 2 GU 345/34 double-acting electric motors producing a total of 1,000 shaft horsepower (1,010 PS; 750 kW) for use while submerged. She had two shafts and two 1.92 m (6 ft) propellers. The boat was capable of operating at depths of up to 230 metres (750 ft).

The submarine had a maximum surface speed of 18.3 knots (33.9 km/h; 21.1 mph) and a maximum submerged speed of 7.3 knots (13.5 km/h; 8.4 mph). When submerged, the boat could operate for 63 nautical miles (117 km; 72 mi) at 4 knots (7.4 km/h; 4.6 mph); when surfaced, she could travel 13,850 nautical miles (25,650 km; 15,940 mi) at 10 knots (19 km/h; 12 mph). U-184 was fitted with six 53.3 cm (21 in) torpedo tubes (four fitted at the bow and two at the stern), 22 torpedoes, one 10.5 cm (4.13 in) SK C/32 naval gun, 180 rounds, and a 3.7 cm (1.5 in) SK C/30 as well as a 2 cm (0.79 in) C/30 anti-aircraft gun. The boat had a complement of forty-eight.

== Service history ==
On her first and only combat patrol she departed Bergen in Norway on 9 November 1942 and entered the north Atlantic via the gap between Iceland and the Faroe Islands. She sank a single ship, the British merchant vessel Widestone about 500 nmi (930 km; 580 mi) southeast of Cape Farewell (Greenland) on 17 November 1942. There were no survivors.

On 21 November she was listed as missing with all 50 hands east of Newfoundland, in approximate position 49°N 45°W.

U-184's loss remains an unsolved mystery. It is possible that she was sunk by a Canadian plane or warship as a result of the Battle of the St. Lawrence.

== Previously recorded fate ==
U-184 was thought to have been sunk by depth charges from the Norwegian corvette Potentilla, but in a post-war assessment this attack was later found to have been against U-264, and had inflicted only minor damage.

== Summary of raiding history ==
Date	Ship	Nationality	Tonnage (GRT)	Fate
17 November 1942	Widestone	United Kingdom	3,192	Sunk

== Bibliography ==
- Busch, Rainer; Röll, Hans-Joachim (1999). German U-boat commanders of World War II : a biographical dictionary. Translated by Brooks, Geoffrey. London, Annapolis, Md: Greenhill Books, Naval Institute Press. ISBN 1-55750-186-6.
- Busch, Rainer; Röll, Hans-Joachim (1999). Deutsche U-Boot-Verluste von September 1939 bis Mai 1945 [German U-boat losses from September 1939 to May 1945]. Der U-Boot-Krieg (in German). Vol. IV. Hamburg, Berlin, Bonn: Mittler. ISBN 3-8132-0514-2.
- Gröner, Erich; Jung, Dieter; Maass, Martin (1991). U-boats and Mine Warfare Vessels. German Warships 1815–1945. Vol. 2. Translated by Thomas, Keith; Magowan, Rachel. London: Conway Maritime Press. ISBN 0-85177-593-4.
