= Convoy TAG 18 =

Convoy TAG.18
- Part of World War II
Date	2–8 November 1942
Location	Lesser Antilles, Caribbean Sea
Result	German victory

Belligerents
Germany	Canada; Greece; Netherlands; Norway; Panama; United Kingdom; United States Venezuela

Commanders and leaders
Admiral Karl Dönitz; Kapitänleutnant Georg Lassen; Hans-Ludwig Witt	

Strength
2 U-boats	37 merchant ships 8 escorts

Casualties and losses
	6 ships sunk

Convoy TAG 18 was a trade convoy of merchant ships during the second World War. It was the 18th of the numbered TAG Convoys from Trinidad and Aruba to Guantánamo. The convoy was shadowed from 1 to 4 November by U-160 skippered by Kapitänleutnant Georg Lassen (Knight's Cross with Oak Leaves) and joined on 5 November by U-129 – skippered by Hans-Ludwig Witt (Knight's Cross of the Iron Cross). The two U-boats sank six ships from the convoy.

== Ships in the convoy ==
Name	Flag	Tonnage (GRT)	Notes
Acasta (1918)	Norway	5,229	
Anna Knudsen (1931)	Norway	9,057	
Ardmore (1913)	United States	7,035	Curaçao to Guantanamo Bay Naval Base
Astrell (1925)	Norway	7,595	Ex Curaçao. Sunk by U-129 on 5 Nov
Baron Elphinstone (1937)	United Kingdom	4,635	
Benjamin Bourn (1942)	United States	7,176	
Chr J Kampmann (1924)	Canada	2,281	Sunk by U-160
Cities Service Kansas (1920)	United States	7,641	Curaçao to Guantanamo Bay Naval Base
City Of Lancaster (1924)	United Kingdom	3,041	
Clio (1935)	Netherlands	374	Curaçao to Guantanamo Bay Naval Base
Domino (1919)	United States	3,170	
Eagle (1917)	United States	6,003	Curaçao to Guantanamo Bay Naval Base
Edward L Doheny (1913)	United States	5,871	Curaçao to Guantanamo Bay Naval Base
Empire Marvell (1941)	United Kingdom	9,812	Curaçao to Guantanamo Bay Naval Base
Errington Court (1925)	United Kingdom	4,913	
Esso Caracas (1913)	Venezuela	4,323	
F H Bedford Jr (1930)	Panama	10,844	Curaçao to Guantanamo Bay Naval Base
Felix Taussig (1917)	United States	5,965	
Gulfpride (1927)	United States	12,510	Curaçao to Guantanamo Bay Naval Base
Gypsum Empress (1929)	United Kingdom	4,034	Sunk by U-160
Hanley (1920)	United States	7,583	Did Not Sail
Jupiter (1928)	Netherlands	1,464	
Kaldfonn (1936)	Norway	9,931	Curaçao to Guantanamo Bay Naval Base
Karmt (1938)	Norway	4,991	
La Salina (1927)	Venezuela	2,402	
Leda (1925)	Panama	8,546	Sunk by U-160, Sank In Tow
Leonidas (1928)	Greece	4,573	
Meton (1920)	United States	7,027	Sunk by U-129 on 5 Nov
Moldova (1911)	Panama	4,083	
Nishmaha (1919)	United States	6,040	
Pan Gulf (1918)	United States	5,599	
Paulsboro (1916)	United States	6,699	Curaçao to Guantanamo Bay Naval Base
Peter Hurll (1930)	Panama	10,871	Curaçao to Guantanamo Bay Naval Base
Prins Maurits (1936)	Netherlands	1,287	
St Clears (1936)	United Kingdom	4,312	
Thorshavet (1938)	Royal Navy	11,015	Sunk by U-160
USCG 6	United States Coast Guard		Escort 4 Nov – 08 Nov
USCG Colfax (WSC-133)	United States Coast Guard		Escort 4 Nov – 08 Nov
USCG Rush (WSC-151)	United States Coast Guard		Escort 4 Nov – 08 Nov
USS Lea (DD-118)	United States Navy		Escort 2 Nov – 08 Nov; Destroyer
USS PCC-469	United States Navy		Escort 2 Nov – 08 Nov
USS PC-495	United States Navy		Escort 2 Nov – 08 Nov
USS PC-559	United States Navy		Escort 2 Nov – 08 Nov
USS PC-561	United States Navy		Escort 2 Nov – 08 Nov
Vulcanus (1907)	Netherlands	1,819	

== Bibliography ==
- Hague, Arnold (2000). The Allied Convoy System 1939–1945. ISBN 1-86176-147-3.
- Rohwer, J.; Hummelchen, G. (1992). Chronology of the War at Sea 1939–1945. Naval Institute Press. ISBN 1-55750-105-X.
