= HNoMS Montbretia =

Norwegian Flower-class corvette

History

Norway
- Name: HNoMS Montbretia
- Ordered: 28 Jun 1940
- Builder: Fleming & Ferguson
- Laid down: 16 November 1940
- Launched: 27 May 1941
- Commissioned: 29 Sep 1941
- Identification: Pennant number: K208
- Fate: Sunk by U-262 on 18 Nov 1942

General characteristics
- Class & type: Flower-class corvette (original)
- Displacement: 925 long tons (940 t)
- Length: 205 ft (62.48 m)o/a
- Beam: 33 ft (10.06 m)
- Draught: 11.5 ft (3.51 m)
- Installed power: 2 × fire tube Scotch boilers; 2,750 ihp (2,050 kW)
- Propulsion: Single shaft; 1 × 4-cycle triple-expansion reciprocating steam engine
- Speed: 16 knots (29.6 km/h)
- Range: 3,500 nautical miles (6,482 km) at 12 knots (22.2 km/h)
- Complement: 85
- Sensors & processing systems: 1 × SW1C or 2C radar; 1 × Type 123A or Type 127DV sonar
- Armament: 1 × BL 4-inch (101.6 mm) Mk.IX single gun; 2 × .50 cal machine gun (twin); 2 × Lewis .303 cal machine gun (twin); 2 × Mk.II depth charge throwers; 2 × Depth charge rails with 40 depth charges

HNoMS Montbretia was a Flower-class corvette of the Royal Norwegian Navy.

== Service History ==
The Montbretia served as a convoy escort in the Atlantic mainly on duty escorting convoys from Canada to the United Kingdom.

== Sinking ==
On 18 November 1942 the Montbretia was sunk by U-262 while tracking a radio contact from U-624. It is hit by two torpedoes which broke the ship in two. From the crew 73 only 25 survived being picked up by HNoMS Potentilla.

== Sources ==
- Friedman, Norman (2008). British Destroyers and Frigates: The Second World War and After. Barnsley, UK: Seaforth Publishing. ISBN 978-1-84832-015-4.
- Lambert, John; Brown, Les (2008). Flower-Class Corvettes. St. Catharines, Ontario, Canada: Vanwall Publishing. ISBN 978-1-55068-986-0.
- Rohwer, Jürgen; Hümmelchen, Gerhard (1992). Chronology of the War at Sea 1939–1945. London: Greenhill Books. ISBN 1-85367-117-7.
