= German submarine U-624 =

German World War II submarine

History

Nazi Germany
- Name: U-624
- Ordered: 15 August 1940
- Builder: Blohm & Voss, Hamburg
- Yard number: 600
- Laid down: 15 July 1941
- Launched: 31 March 1942
- Commissioned: 28 May 1942
- Fate: Sunk on 7 February 1943 in the North Atlantic in position 55°42′N 26°17′W, by an RAF B-17 Flying Fortress aircraft.

General characteristics
- Class & type: Type VIIC submarine
- Displacement: 769 tonnes (757 long tons) surfaced; 871 t (857 long tons) submerged
- Length: 67.10 m (220 ft 2 in) o/a; 50.50 m (165 ft 8 in) pressure hull
- Beam: 6.20 m (20 ft 4 in) o/a; 4.70 m (15 ft 5 in) pressure hull
- Height: 9.60 m (31 ft 6 in)
- Draught: 4.74 m (15 ft 7 in)
- Installed power: 2,800–3,200 PS (2,100–2,400 kW; 2,800–3,200 bhp) (diesels); 750 PS (550 kW; 740 shp) (electric)
- Propulsion: 2 shafts; 2 × diesel engines; 2 × electric motors
- Speed: 17.7 knots (32.8 km/h; 20.4 mph) surfaced; 7.6 knots (14.1 km/h; 8.7 mph) submerged
- Range: 8,500 nmi (15,700 km; 9,800 mi) at 10 knots (19 km/h; 12 mph) surfaced; 80 nmi (150 km; 92 mi) at 4 knots (7.4 km/h; 4.6 mph) submerged
- Test depth: 230 m (750 ft); Crush depth: 250–295 m (820–968 ft)
- Complement: 4 officers, 40–56 enlisted
- Armament: 5 × 53.3 cm (21 in) torpedo tubes (four bow, one stern); 14 × torpedoes or 26 TMA mines; 1 × 8.8 cm (3.46 in) deck gun (220 rounds); 1 x 2 cm (0.79 in) C/30 AA gun

Service record
- Part of: 8th U-boat Flotilla; 28 May – 30 September 1942; 7th U-boat Flotilla; 1 October 1942 – 7 February 1943
- Identification codes: M 04 328
- Commanders: Kptlt. Ulrich Graf von Soden-Fraunhofen; 28 May 1942 – 7 February 1943
- Operations: 2 patrols: 1st patrol: 10 October – 4 December 1942; 2nd patrol: 7 January – 7 February 1943
- Victories: 5 merchant ships sunk (39,855 GRT); 3 warships sunk (873 tons); 1 merchant ship damaged (5,432 GRT)

German submarine U-624 was a Type VIIC U-boat built for Nazi Germany's Kriegsmarine for service during World War II. She was laid down on 15 July 1941 by Blohm & Voss in Hamburg as yard number 600, launched on 31 March 1942 and commissioned on 28 May 1942 under Kapitänleutnant Ulrich Graf von Soden-Fraunhofen.

== Design ==
German Type VIIC submarines were preceded by the shorter Type VIIB submarines. U-624 had a displacement of 769 tonnes (757 long tons) when at the surface and 871 tonnes (857 long tons) while submerged. She had a total length of 67.10 m (220 ft 2 in), a pressure hull length of 50.50 m (165 ft 8 in), a beam of 6.20 m (20 ft 4 in), a height of 9.60 m (31 ft 6 in), and a draught of 4.74 m (15 ft 7 in). The submarine was powered by two Germaniawerft F46 four-stroke, six-cylinder supercharged diesel engines producing a total of 2,800 to 3,200 metric horsepower (2,060 to 2,350 kW; 2,760 to 3,160 shp) for use while surfaced, two Brown, Boveri & Cie GG UB 720/8 double-acting electric motors producing a total of 750 metric horsepower (550 kW; 740 shp) for use while submerged. She had two shafts and two 1.23 m (4 ft) propellers. The boat was capable of operating at depths of up to 230 metres (750 ft).

The submarine had a maximum surface speed of 17.7 knots (32.8 km/h; 20.4 mph) and a maximum submerged speed of 7.6 knots (14.1 km/h; 8.7 mph). When submerged, the boat could operate for 80 nautical miles (150 km; 92 mi) at 4 knots (7.4 km/h; 4.6 mph); when surfaced, she could travel 8,500 nautical miles (15,700 km; 9,800 mi) at 10 knots (19 km/h; 12 mph). U-624 was fitted with five 53.3 cm (21 in) torpedo tubes (four fitted at the bow and one at the stern), fourteen torpedoes, one 8.8 cm (3.46 in) SK C/35 naval gun, 220 rounds, and a 2 cm (0.79 in) C/30 anti-aircraft gun. The boat had a complement of between forty-four and sixty.

== Service history ==
The boat's service began on 28 May 1942 with training as part of the 8th U-boat Flotilla. She was transferred to the 7th Flotilla, operating out of St.Nazaire, on 1 October 1942 for active service in the North Atlantic .

In just two patrols she sank five merchant ships and three warships for a total of 39,855 gross register tons (GRT) and 873 tons, plus one merchant ship damaged.

=== Fate ===
U-624 was sunk on 7 February 1943 in the North Atlantic in position 55°42′N 26°17′W. She was caught unawares on the surface whilst transmitting to base a lengthy report of the previous night's action around Convoy SC 118. An RAF B-17 Flying Fortress aircraft of (Sqdn. 220/J), operating out of Londonderry Port, depth charged her 55 nautical miles (102 km; 63 mi) astern of the convoy. All 45 hands were lost.

=== Wolfpacks ===
U-624 took part in five wolfpacks, namely:

- Puma (23 – 29 October 1942)
- Natter (30 October – 8 November 1942)
- Kreuzotter (8 – 24 November 1942)
- Habicht (10 – 19 January 1943)
- Haudegen (19 January – 7 February 1943)

== Summary of raiding history ==
Date	Ship Name	Nationality	Tonnage (Note: Merchant ship tonnages are in gross register tons. Military vessels are listed by tons displacement.)	Fate
29 October 1942	Kosmos II	Norway	16,966	Sunk
29 October 1942	HMS LCT-2190 (Note: Being carried by Kosmos II)	Royal Navy	291	Sunk
29 October 1942	HMS LCT-2192	Royal Navy	291	Sunk
29 October 1942	HMS LCT-2284	Royal Navy	291	Sunk
29 October 1942	Pan-New York	United States	7,701	Sunk
18 November 1942	President Sergent	United Kingdom	5,344	Sunk
18 November 1942	Parismina	United States	4,732	Sunk
18 November 1942	Yaka	United States	5,432	Damaged
25 January 1943	Lackenby	United Kingdom	5,112	Sunk

== Bibliography ==
- Busch, Rainer; Röll, Hans-Joachim (1999). German U-boat commanders of World War II : a biographical dictionary. Translated by Brooks, Geoffrey. London, Annapolis, Md: Greenhill Books, Naval Institute Press. ISBN 1-55750-186-6.
- Busch, Rainer; Röll, Hans-Joachim (1999). Der U-Boot-Krieg, 1939-1945: Deutsche U-Boot-Verluste von September 1939 bis Mai 1945 [German U-boat losses from September 1939 to May 1945] (in German). Vol. IV. Hamburg, Berlin, Bonn: Mittler. ISBN 3-8132-0514-2.
- Edwards, Bernard (1996). Dönitz and the Wolf Packs - The U-boats at War. pp. 148–149. ISBN 0-304-35203-9.
- Gröner, Eric; Jung, Dieter; Maass, Martin (1991). German Warships 1815-1945: U-boats and Mine Warfare Vessels. Vol. 2. Translated by Thomas, Keith; Magowan, Rachel. London: Conway Maritime Press. ISBN 0-85177-593-4.
- Sharpe, Peter (1998). U-Boat Fact File. Great Britain: Midland Publishing. ISBN 1-85780-072-9.
