= SS Glenlea =

History

United Kingdom
- Name: Glenlea
- Owner: John Morrison & Son
- Builder: John Priestman & Co.
- Yard number: 296
- Laid down: January 1930
- Launched: 9 July 1930
- Fate: Sunk on 7 November 1942 by German submarine U-566

General characteristics
- Type: Merchant ship
- Tonnage: 4,252 GRT
- Length: 367 ft 6 in
- Beam: 51 ft 6 in
- Height: 25 ft 1 in
- Draught: 27 ft 6 in
- Propulsion: Steam powered
- Speed: 10 knots
- Crew: 49

SS Glenlea was a merchant ship built by John Priestman & Co in Southwick, Sunderland and was completed in August of 1930. She was owned by John Morrison & Son located in Newcastle-upon-Tyne. She was sunk in 1942 after becoming a straggler in convoy ON 142.

== History ==
Glenlea was a British steam merchant ship and was one of two of the last ships built by John Priestman & Co., the other ship being the Finland. The ship was finished in August of 1930. The ship eventually came under ownership of John Morrison & Son.

On 7 November 1942, the Glenlea was torpedoed and sunk by German submarine U-566 after falling behind from its convoy, ON 142. Out of the 49 crew on board, 44 died.
