= List of shipwrecks in May 1940 =

The list of shipwrecks in May 1940 includes ships sunk, foundered, grounded, or otherwise lost during May 1940.

== 1 May ==
List of shipwrecks: 1 May 1940
Ship	State	Description
Arlington	Canada	After departing Port Arthur, Ontario, Canada, on 30 April, the 244-foot (74 m) bulk carrier sank in 600 feet (183 m) of water in Lake Superior 35 nautical miles (65 km; 40 mi) north of the Keweenaw Peninsula near Superior Shoal in the Copper Harbor, Michigan, area during a storm after her captain first ordered her to continue her voyage into the open lake rather than seek sheltered waters near the coast, then gave no order to abandon ship after she began to take on water. The cargo ship Collingwood ( Canada) rescued her entire crew except for her captain, who made no effort to abandon ship and was last seen waving to Collingwood as he went down with his ship. The wreck was located in 2023.
Bahia Castillo	Kriegsmarine	World War II: The troopship was torpedoed and damaged in the Skaggerak south east of Skagen, Denmark by HMS Narwhal (Royal Navy). Ten men and twenty-six horses were lost and twenty-three men were wounded. The ship was towed into Frederikshavn, and it was scrapped at Kiel in September 1940.
Beaufort	Norway	World War II: The tanker (5,053 GRT) had been bombed and damaged several times at Øye by Luftwaffe aircraft in the last days, and was scuttled by her crew to stop the air attacks on the town. There were no casualties. She was raised in September 1941, laid up, and repaired post-war.
Buenos Aires	Kriegsmarine	World War II: Norwegian Campaign: The troopship was torpedoed and sunk in the Skaggerak east of Skagen by HMS Narwhal (Royal Navy). Sixty men and two hundred and forty horses were lost and sixty-four men were wounded.
Dronning Maud	Norway	Dronning Maud World War II: The troopship (1,589 GRT) was bombed and set on fire in Gratangen, off Foldvik by bombers of Lehrgeschwader 1, Luftwaffe. 10 medical staff passengers and 8 crew were killed, another crew dying of his wounds the next day. The burning ship was towed off the quay and sank the next day.
Haga	Sweden	World War II: The cargo ship (1,296 GRT) struck a German mine and sank in the Kattegat (57°30′N 4°55′E) with the loss of four of her 17 crew.
La Cancalaise	France	World War II: The fishing trawler struck a mine and sank in the North Sea off the Dyck Lightship (France) with the loss of 23 of her 31 crew.
Matakana	United Kingdom	The refrigerated cargo ship ran aground in the Caribbean Sea off Mayaguana, Bahamas and was wrecked. Her 78 crew were rescued by Panama (United States).
Pioner I	Norway	World War II: The coaster was bombed and sunk at Hjørungavåg, Norway by Luftwaffe aircraft.She was later raised, repaired and entered Kriegsmarine service as Raeter.
Uller	Kriegsmarine	World War II: The minelayer, a former Vale-class gunboat was bombed and damaged in Sognefjord, Norway by Heinkel He 115 aircraft of the Royal Norwegian Navy Air Service. She was beached and subsequently scuttled by Tyr (Kriegsmarine).
HNoMS Veslefrik	Royal Norwegian Navy	World War II: The guard ship was run aground in Lønnefjord, Norway, to prevent capture by the Germans.

== 2 May ==
For the loss of RFA Boardale on this day, see the entry for 30 April 1940.

List of shipwrecks: 2 May 1940
Ship	State	Description
Cläre Hugo Stinnes 1	Germany	World War II: The cargo ship was shelled off Skorpa, Norway by HMS Trident (Royal Navy) and beached in Korsfjord. She was later salvaged, repaired and returned to service.
Gioannoulis Gounaris	Greece	World War II: The cargo ship was driven ashore near Foreland Point, Devon, United Kingdom and was wrecked. She was refloated on 8 July and consequently scrapped.
Redstone	United Kingdom	World War II: The WWI C-class standard cargo ship was scuttled as a blockship in Kirk Sound, Scapa Flow Orkney Islands (58°54′35″N 2°53′50″W). She was salvaged in September 1948 and scrapped.

== 3 May ==
For the loss of HMTs Aston Villa, Gaul and St Goran on this day, see the entry for 30 April 1940.

List of shipwrecks: 3 May 1940
Ship	State	Description
HMS Afridi	Royal Navy	World War II: The Tribal-class destroyer was bombed and sunk in the Norwegian Sea off Namsos, Norway (66°14′N 5°45′E) by Junkers Ju 87 aircraft of the Luftwaffe with the loss of 49 of her 219 crew, 30 survivors of Bison (French Navy) and thirteen other military passengers. Survivors were rescued by HMS Griffin and HMS Imperial (both Royal Navy).
Bison	French Navy	World War II: Namsos Campaign: The Guépard-class destroyer was bombed and damaged off Trondheim, Norway (65°42′N 7°17′E) by Luftwaffe aircraft. She was scuttled by HMS Afridi, which had rescued 69 survivors, more survivors rescued by HMS Imperial and HMS Grenade (all Royal Navy). One hundred and two crew and a Royal Navy observer were killed.
HNoMS Djerv	Royal Norwegian Navy	World War II: The 2.-class torpedo boat was scuttled off Kvamsøya to prevent capture by German forces.
HNoMS Dristig	Royal Norwegian Navy	World War II: The 2.-class torpedo boat was scuttled off Kvamsøya to prevent capture by German forces.
Magicienne	Denmark	The schooner ran aground west of St Abb's Head, Berwickshire, United Kingdom. All eight crew survived.
Scientist	United Kingdom	World War II: The cargo ship was shelled and sunk in the South Atlantic (19°55′S 4°20′E) by Atlantis (Kriegsmarine) with the loss of two of her 50 crew. Survivors were taken aboard as prisoners of war; 27 crewmen and a passenger were put on Tirranna (Germany). The passenger and one crewman were killed when Tiranna was sunk later off France. Fifteen other crewmen were put aboard Durmitor (Kingdom of Yugoslavia): and interned in Italian Somaliland.

== 4 May ==
For the loss of the Norwegian coastal tanker MV Rødskjæl, which may have occurred on this date, see the list for April 1940.

List of shipwrecks: 4 May 1940
Ship	State	Description
Aafjord	Norway	World War II: The coaster was bombed and sunk in Breiviken by Luftwaffe aircraft. She was later raised, repaired and returned to service.
Almy	Sweden	World War II: The fishing boat struck a mine in the Kattegat (57°33′N 11°35′E) and sank with the loss of all four crew.
Blaafjeld I	Norway	World War II: The cargo ship (1,146 GRT) was bombed and sunk near Kolvereid, Norway, by Luftwaffe aircraft. THere were no casualty.
ORP Grom	Polish Navy	World War II: The Grom-class destroyer was bombed and sunk in Ofotfjord off Narvik, Norway, by Heinkel He 111 aircraft of Kampfgruppe 100, Luftwaffe with the loss of 59 of her 192 crew. Survivors were rescued by HMS Aurora, HMS Bedouin, HMS Enterprise and HMS Faulknor (all Royal Navy).
Monark	Sweden	World War II: The cargo ship (1,786 GRT) had been seized by Germans at Bergen and was sailing to Germany when she was intercepted in the North Sea off Stavanger, Norway, by HMS Severn (Royal Navy). After the five German prize crew were captured and the Norwegian crew members set ashore, she was torpedoed and sunk (57°57′N 6°13′E).
Pan	Norway	World War II: The cargo ship was bombed and sunk in the Norwegian Sea off Namsos, Norway, by Luftwaffe aircraft. The wreck was raised in 1942, repaired and returned to service.
San Tiburcio	United Kingdom	World War II: The tanker struck a mine in the Moray Firth off Balintore, Ross-shire, and sank. All 40 crew were rescued by HMS Codrington and HMT Leicester City (both Royal Navy).
Sekstant	Norway	World War II: The cargo ship was bombed and sunk in the Norwegian Sea north of Namsos by Luftwaffe aircraft. Her crew were rescued.

== 5 May ==
List of shipwrecks: 5 May 1940
Ship	State	Description
Eldrid	Norway	World War II: The damaged cargo ship was scuttled at Narvik by German forces.
Graig	United Kingdom	World War II: Convoy HX 40: The cargo ship ran aground at Egg Island, Nova Scotia, Canada and broke in two. She was declared a total loss. Both parts were refloated and towed in to Halifax, Nova Scotia. They were scrapped.
Maianbar	(United Kingdom) Australia	The cargo shipran aground off Newcastle, New South Wales. She was declared a total loss.
Richard With	Norway	World War II: The cargo liner was attacked and damaged off Sørreisa by Luftwaffe aircraft and was beached. She was later refloated, repaired and returned to service.
HNoMS Sild	Royal Norwegian Navy	World War II: The 1.-class torpedo boat was scuttled in the Norwegian Sea off Harøya to prevent capture by German forces.

== 6 May ==
List of shipwrecks: 6 May 1940
Ship	State	Description
Brage	Germany	World War II: The cargo ship struck a mine in the North Sea off the Kiel Lightship (Germany) and sank. Her crew were rescued.
Brighton	United Kingdom	World War II: The tanker struck a mine and sank in the North Sea off Dunkerque, Nord, France (51°03′06″N 2°08′40″E). Her 34 crew were rescued.
HMT Loch Naver	Royal Navy	The naval trawler collided with another vessel off Hartlepool, Co Durham and sank. Survivors were rescued by the yacht Breda (United Kingdom).
V 101 Schwan	Kriegsmarine	The vorpostenboot sank in the Kattegat.
V 811 Hugo Homann	Kriegsmarine	World War II: The vorpostenboot struck a mine in the Ems estuary and sank.
Vogesen	Germany	World War II: The cargo ship struck a mine and sank in the Kattegat (57°33′N 11°35′E).

== 7 May ==
List of shipwrecks: 7 May 1940
Ship	State	Description
Saint Pierre	Belgium	World War II: The fishing boat struck a mine in the North Sea and sank.

== 8 May ==
List of shipwrecks: 8 May 1940
Ship	State	Description
Doris	French Navy	World War II: The Circé-class submarine was torpedoed and sunk in the North Sea west of Petten, Netherlands (53°40′N 4°00′E) by U-9 (Kriegsmarine) with the loss of all 44 crew and three Royal Navy officers.
Gerda	Denmark	World War II: The cargo ship struck a mine in the North Sea off Bergen, Norway and was damaged. She was subsequently repaired and returned to service.
Oxelösund	Sweden	World War II: The cargo ship sank at Narvik, Norway due to damage received in an air attack on 10 April. She was refloated in 1947, repaired, and returned to service in 1950 as Laidaure.
HNoMS Skrei	Royal Norwegian Navy	World War II: The 1.-class torpedo boat was scuttled off Aspøya to prevent capture by German forces.
USS Tutuila	United States Navy	The Wake-class gunboat ran aground in the Yangtze River at Chunking, China and was damaged. She was refloated on 13 May. Subsequently repaired and returned to service.

== 9 May ==
List of shipwrecks: 9 May 1940
Ship	State	Description
Corrientes	Germany	World War II: The tanker was sabotaged and sunk at Las Palmas, Canary Islands, Spain by French divers. She was later refloated, repaired and returned to service.
Emsstrom	Germany	World War II: The cargo ship struck a mine and sank in the Hubertgat. She was later refloated, repaired and returned to service.
M-134	Kriegsmarine	World War II: The Type 1916 minesweeper was bombed and sunk at Bergen, Norway by Blackburn Skua aircraft of 806 Naval Air Squadron, Fleet Air Arm or Bristol Blenheim aircraft of 254 Squadron, Royal Air Force. She was later salvaged, repaired and returned to service as M534.

== 10 May ==
List of shipwrecks: 10 May 1940
Ship	State	Description
Antilla	Germany	World War II: The cargo ship was scuttled in the Caribbean Sea off Aruba, Curaçao and Dependencies to avoid capture by the Dutch. Cold water reached her boilers and they exploded blowing her in half.
Ayaha Maru	Japan	The cargo ship was driven ashore east of the Meshima Lighthouse, in the Gotō Islands, and sank.
Boschdijk	Netherlands	World War II: The cargo ship was bombed and sunk at Rotterdam, South Holland by Luftwaffe aircraft.
Calaisien	France	World War II: The tug was bombed and sunk at Calais by Luftwaffe aircraft.
Campinas	Germany	World War II: The troopship struck a mine and sank in the Kattegat off Drogden, Denmark.
HNLMS de Oceaan	Royal Netherlands Navy	World War II: The tug was scuttled in the Wadden Sea between Ameland and Terschelling, Friesland.
Dinteldijk	Germany	World War II: The cargo ship was bombed, set afire and sunk at Rotterdam by either Allied or Luftwaffe aircraft. She was later refloated.
Goslar	Germany	World War II: The cargo ship was scuttled in shallow water off Paramaribo, Suriname to avoid capture by Dutch forces, settling on its side partially above water.
Henry Woodall	United Kingdom	World War II: The collier struck a mine and sank in the North Sea three nautical miles (5.6 km; 3.5 mi) off Withernsea, Yorkshire with the loss of seven of her 14 crew. Survivors were rescued by Viiu (Estonia).
Nordnorge	Kriegsmarine	World War II: The coaster, used as a troopship, was shelled, torpedoed and sunk at Hemnesberget, Norway by HMS Calcutta and HMS Zulu (both Royal Navy).
Sophie Rickmers	Germany	World War II: The cargo ship was scuttled at Sabang, Netherlands East Indies to avoid capture by Dutch forces. Although declared a total loss, she was raised, repaired and put in Dutch service as Toendjoek.
HNLMS Van Galen	Royal Netherlands Navy	World War II: The Admiralen-class destroyer was bombed and damaged in the Waalhaven, Rotterdam by Heinkel He 111 aircraft of Kampfgeschwader 4, Luftwaffe. She later sank in the Merwedehaven.

== 11 May ==
For the loss of the Swedish ship Stråssa on this date, see the entry for 10 April 1940

List of shipwrecks: 11 May 1940
Ship	State	Description
HNLMS Braga	Royal Netherlands Navy	World War II: The gunboat was scuttled in the Waal.
Sally	Finland	World War II: The cargo ship struck a mine and sank in the Kattegat.
Statendam	Netherlands	World War II: The ocean liner was sunk at Rotterdam, South Holland in a Luftwaffe air raid.
Stella	Netherlands	World War II: The cargo ship was bombed and sunk in the North Sea off Vlissingen, Zeeland by Luftwaffe aircraft.
Tringa	United Kingdom	World War II: The cargo ship was torpedoed and sunk in the North Sea off Ostend, West Flanders, Belgium by U-9 (Kriegsmarine) with the loss of seventeen of the 23 people aboard. Survivors were rescued by HMS Malcolm (Royal Navy).
Veendam	Netherlands	World War II: The ocean liner was sunk at Rotterdam in a Luftwaffe air raid. She was subsequently salvaged and taken in to German service.
Viiu	Estonia	World War II: The cargo ship was torpedoed and sunk in the North Sea (51°21′N 2°25′E) by U-9 (Kriegsmarine). Only five people aboard survived. They were rescued by HMT Arctic Hunter (Royal Navy).

== 12 May ==
List of shipwrecks: 12 May 1940
Ship	State	Description
HNLMS Bulgia	Royal Netherlands Navy	World War II: The Thor-class gunboat (270 GRT) was sunk in the port of Vlissingen, Zeeland by Luftwaffe aircraft. Thirteen crew were killed. She was raised on 31 July 1940 and scrapped by the Germans.
HNLMS Friso	Royal Netherlands Navy	World War II: The Gruno-class gunboat was bombed and sunk in the IJsselmeer off Enkhuizen, North Holland by Luftwaffe aircraft. The capsized wreck was shelled and sunk by HNLMS Pieter Florisz (Royal Netherlands Navy). Three crew were killed. She was raised on 15 March 1943 and scrapped by the Germans.
HMCS Gate Vessel No. 1	Royal Canadian Navy	World War II: Convoy TC 4A: The Battle-class trawler was rammed by HMS Revenge (Royal Navy) at Halifax, Nova Scotia and sank. Her eighteen crew were rescued.
Henrica	Netherlands	The coaster collided with another vessel and sank.
Jura	Switzerland	World War II: The tanker (799 GRT) struck a mine and sank in the North Sea off Zeebrugge, West Flanders, Belgium with the loss of two lives.
Käthe Jürgensen	Germany	World War II: The schooner struck a mine and sank in the Bay of Lübeck.
HNLMS Luctor et Emergo	Royal Netherlands Navy	World War II: the hospital ship was sunk in the port of Vlissingen, Zeeland, Netherlands by Luftwaffe aircraft. Seven crew and five civilians having taken shelter aboard were killed.
Prinses Juliana	Netherlands	World War II: The passenger ship was bombed and sunk in the North Sea off Hook of Holland, South Holland by Luftwaffe aircraft. Survivors were rescued by HMS Havock and HMS Wild Swan (both Royal Navy).
Ranheim	Norway	World War II: The coaster was shelled and sunk at Hemnesberget, Norway by HMS Carlisle and HMS Zulu (both Royal Navy).
Roek	United Kingdom	World War II: The coaster struck a mine and sank in the Nieuwe Waterweg at Rotterdam, South Holland (51°54′N 4°21′E). All 51 people aboard were rescued.
St. Denis	United Kingdom	World War II: The cargo ship struck a mine and sank in the Nieuwe Waterweg between Hook of Holland and Rotterdam. She was later salvaged by the Germans and became the accommodation ship Barbara.
Van Rensselaer	Netherlands	World War II: The passenger shipstruck a mine at IJmuiden, North Holland and was beached. She was declared a total loss.

== 13 May ==
List of shipwrecks: 13 May 1940
Ship	State	Description
Anhalt	Germany	World War II: The troopship struck a mine off the coast of Sweden and was beached. She was later repaired and returned to service.
Bussum	Netherlands	World War II: The cargo ship was bombed and damaged in the North Sea off the Noord Hinder Lightship (Netherlands). She was abandoned by her 29 crew, who were rescued by Bouclier (French Navy). Bussum was towed to London, United Kingdom. She was subsequently repaired and returned to service.
HNLMS Christiaan Cornelis	Royal Netherlands Navy	World War II: The K-class torpedo boat was scuttled at Rotterdam, South Holland following severe battle damage.
Georges-Eduard	Belgian Navy	The patrol boat, a former fishing vessel, was lost on this date.
Gorm	Denmark	World War II: The cargo ship (2,156 GRT) struck a mine in the North Sea off Zeebrugge, West Flanders, Belgium (51°22′12″N 3°12′59″E) and sank. All aboard survived, only one sailor was wounded.
Kyle Firth	United Kingdom	The cargo ship ran aground on Holy Island, Anglesey and was wrecked.
HNLMS M 2	Royal Netherlands Navy	World War II: The M-class minesweeper (205 GRT) was sunk by a magnetic mine in the North Sea off IJmuiden, North Holland. Seven of her crew were killed. She was salvaged in July 1940 and put into service by the Germans as LAZ-47 (Kriegsmarine).
Ville du Bizerte	French Navy	World War II: The auxiliary minesweeper struck a mine and sank in the Mediterranean Sea off Cape Guardia, Algeria.

== 14 May ==
List of shipwrecks: 14 May 1940
Ship	State	Description
HNLMS Abraham van der Hulst	Royal Netherlands Navy	World War II: Jan van Amstel-class minesweeper was scuttled at Enkhuizen, North Holland. She was subsequently salvaged by the Germans, repaired and entered Kriegsmarine service as M 553.
Batterijschip IJmuiden	Royal Netherlands Navy	World War II: The former coastal defence ship was scuttled at IJmuiden, North Holland to prevent capture by German forces. She was subsequently salvaged by the Germans, repaired and entered service as Undine.
HNLMS Brinio	Royal Netherlands Navy	World War II: The Brinio-class gunboat was bombed and damaged in the IJsselmeer by Luftwaffe aircraft and subsequently scuttled. She was raised on 12 October 1942 and scrapped by the Germans.
Chrobry	Poland	World War II: The troopship was bombed and damaged in the Vestfjorden, off northern Norway (67°40′N 13°50′E). Eleven crew members and an unknown number of troops were killed. She was scuttled on 16 May due to damage received.
HNLMS Freyr	Royal Netherlands Navy	World War II: The Thor-class gunboat was scuttled in the Binnen IJ at Nieuwendam, North Holland. She was later refloated.
HNLMS Gerard Callenburgh	Royal Netherlands Navy	World War II: The Gerard Callenburgh-class destroyer was scuttled in the Nieuwe Waterweg at Rotterdam, South Holland to prevent capture by German forces.
HNLMS Hefring	Royal Netherlands Navy	World War II: The Thor-class gunboat was scuttled by her crew at Amsterdam North Holland. She was later salvaged by the Germans. She was raised on 23 September 1940. Conflicting information as to whether or not she was scrapped. It is possible that she was used as a "Küstenschutzboot" and was lost in service. Another report is that she was towed to the Coenhaven on 26 September, where she sank again, and was subsequently raised and scrapped.
HNLMS Jan Danielzoon van de Rijn	Royal Netherlands Navy	World War II: The torpedo boat was scuttled at Rotterdam. She was later salvaged by the Germans and entered service as TFA 10.
Jan Pieterszoon Coen	Netherlands	World War II: The passenger ship was scuttled as a blockship at IJmuiden. The wreck was subsequently cleared.
HNLMS Johan Maurits van Nassau	Royal Netherlands Navy	World War II: The sloop was bombed and sunk in the North Sea 10 nautical miles (19 km) west of Callantsoog, North Holland, by Luftwaffe aircraft with the loss of seventeen of her crew.
HNLMS G 16	Royal Netherlands Navy	World War II: The G 13-class torpedo boat was scuttled at Den Helder, North Holland. She was later salvaged by the Germans and entered service as TFA 9.
HNLMS M 1	Royal Netherlands Navy	World War II: The M-class minesweeperwas scuttled at IJmuiden. She was later salvaged and put into service by the Germans as LAZ-46.
HNLMS M 3	Royal Netherlands Navy	World War II: The M-class minesweeper was scuttled as a blockship at IJmuiden. The wreck was later dispersed by explosives.
HNLMS M 4	Royal Netherlands Navy	World War II: The M-class minesweeper was scuttled at IJmuiden. She was later salvaged and put into service by the Germans as ZRD-57.
Naaldwijk	Netherlands	World War II: The cargo ship was scuttled at IJmuiden. She was subsequently salvaged by the Germans, repaired and entered service as Hans Christophersen.
HNLMS Noordzee II	Royal Netherlands Navy	World War II: The naval tug struck a mine and sank in the Westerschelde with the loss of twenty of her 22 crew.
HNLMS O 8	Royal Netherlands Navy	World War II: The O 8-class submarinewas scuttled at Den Helder, North Holland to prevent capture by German forces. She was subsequently salvaged by the Germans, repaired and entered service as U-D1.
HNLMS O 11	Royal Netherlands Navy	World War II: The O 9-class submarinewas scuttled at Den Helder to prevent capture by German forces. She was subsequently salvaged by the Germans, repaired and entered service as U-D2.
HNLMS O 12	Royal Netherlands Navy	World War II: The O 12-class submarine was scuttled at Den Helder while undergoing maintenance at the Rijkswerf shipyard to prevent capture by German forces.
HNLMS O 25	Royal Netherlands Navy	World War II: The O 21-class submarine was scuttled at Schiedam, South Holland to prevent capture by German forces. She was subsequently salvaged by the Germans, repaired and entered service as UD-3.
HNLMS O 26	Royal Netherlands Navy	World War II: The O 21-class submarine was scuttled at Schiedam to prevent capture by German forces. She was subsequently salvaged by the Germans, repaired and entered service as UD-4.
HNLMS O 27	Royal Netherlands Navy	World War II: The O 21-class submarine was scuttled at Schiedam to prevent capture by German forces. She was subsequently salvaged by the Germans, repaired and entered service as UD-5.
HNLMS Pieter Florisz	Royal Netherlands Navy	World War II: The Jan van Amstel-class minesweeper was scuttled at Enkhuizen. She was subsequently salvaged by the Germans, repaired and entered service as M 551.
HNLMS Tjerk Hiddes	Royal Netherlands Navy	World War II: The Gerard Callenburgh-class destroyerwas scuttled in the Nieuwe Waterweg at Rotterdam to prevent capture by German forces.
HNLMS Tyr	Royal Netherlands Navy	World War II: The gunboat was scuttled. She was later salvaged by the Germans.
Ville de Bruges	Belgium	World War II: The ocean liner was severely damaged in a Luftwaffe air raid whilst in the Scheldt (51°18′36″N 4°16′24″E). She was beached and burnt out with the loss of four crew of the 117 people aboard. The wreck was removed in January 1952.
HNLMS Z 3	Royal Netherlands Navy	World War II: The Z 1-class torpedo boat was scuttled by running onto a breakwater and then burned in the IJsselmeer off Enkhuizen. She was refloated in 1941 and scrapped by the Germans.

== 15 May ==
List of shipwrecks: 15 May 1940
Ship	State	Description
HNLMS Braga	Royal Netherlands Navy	The Thor-class gunboat was beached in the Waal. She was probably scrapped by the Germans.
Duquesne II	French Navy	World War II: The auxiliary minesweeper struck a mine at the mouth of the Scheldt and sank with the loss of 23 of her crew.
Evgenia	Greece	Evgenia World War II: The cargo ship was bombed and severely damaged in the Scheldt at Knokke, West Flanders, Belgium (51°23′N 3°07′E) by Luftwaffe aircraft. There were no casualties. She was abandoned the next day and scuttled two days later in the Zeebrugge Roads.
Foscolo	Italy	World War II: The cargo ship (3,059 GRT) was bombed and heavily damaged in the North Sea 6 nautical miles (11 km) north east of Zeebrugge, West Flanders by Luftwaffe aircraft. All 43 men aboard abandonned her and landed at Zeebrudge. She capsized and sank on 18 May.
Henri Guegan	French Navy	World War II: The auxiliary minesweeper struck a mine at the mouth of the Scheldt and sank with the loss of seventeen of her crew.
HNLMS Hydra	Royal Netherlands Navy	World War II: The Hydra-class minelayer was beached to prevent sinking on the coast of Zeeland, the Netherlands following damage by German anti-tank gunfire. She was subsequently scuttled. Later refloated and scrapped.
Loodsboot No.1	Netherlands	World War II: The pilot vessel struck a mine and sank in the Westerscheldt.
HMS Valentine	Royal Navy	World War II: The V-class destroyer was bombed off Terneuzen, Zeeland by a Junkers Ju 88 aircraft of the Luftwaffe with the loss of 31 crew killed and 21 wounded. She was beached and abandoned. HMS Valentine was then scuttled by HMS Whitley (Royal Navy).

== 17 May ==
List of shipwrecks: 17 May 1940
Ship	State	Description
Mardyck	French Navy	The auxiliary minesweeper caught fire and was beached and abandoned at Breskens, Zeeland, Netherlands.
HNLMS Philips Van Almonde	Royal Netherlands Navy	World War II: The Gerard Callenburgh-class destroyer was scuttled on her slipway at Vlissingen, Zeeland to prevent capture by German forces.
Saint Kearan	United Kingdom	The cargo ship collided with Explorateur Grandidier (France) in the Firth of Clyde and sank north west of Girvan, Ayrshire. All her 12 crew were rescued.

== 18 May ==
List of shipwrecks: 18 May 1940
Ship	State	Description
HMS Effingham	Royal Navy	World War II: Norwegian Campaign: The Hawkins-class cruiser ran aground on a reef in the Norwegian Sea near Bodø, Norway (67°17′N 13°58′E) and abandoned. She was subsequently scuttled by gunfire and torpedoes from HMS Matabele (Royal Navy) on May 21.
Pia	Netherlands	World War II: The coaster was towing the luxury yacht Albatross III (Netherlands) under its Commander, C L ter Meulen, to Boulogne, Pas-de-Calais, France when she struck a mine in the North Sea off Gravelines, Nord, France. The Pia's captain, A. Pekelder, his wife, four of the five crew and all four passengers were killed. Albatross III rescued the sole survivor, one of the mates, who survived because at the moment of the explosion he was in the front of the ship while all the others were aft.
Police de la Rade III	Belgian Navy	World War II: The patrol boat (122 GRT) was scuttled in the port of Antwerp by her crew. There were no casualty.
Sirius	Norway	World War II: The coaster was sunk in Solbergfjorden off Dyrøya by Luftwaffe aircraft. Seven crew members, including both the captain and the first mate, were killed in the sinking, whilst eleven survivors were rescued from the water by local people in rowing boats. The survivors, who had been strafed in the water by the German aircraft, were later retrieved by the submarine tender Lyngen (Royal Norwegian Navy) and the steamship Mosken (Norway).
Torgtind	Norway	World War II: The cargo ship was bombed in the Norwegian Sea off Bratland by Luftwaffe aircraft. She sank the next day. All six crew survived.
Vlaanderen I	Belgium	World War II: The dredger was bombed and sunk at Calais, France, by Luftwaffe aircraft.

== 19 May ==
List of shipwrecks: 19 May 1940
Ship	State	Description
Albion	Kriegsmarine	World War II: The former fishing trawler was sunk near Brønnøysund, Norway by HNoMS Heilhorn and HNoMS Honningsvåg (both Royal Norwegian Navy).
Augustin Normand	French Navy	World War II: The auxiliary minesweeper was bombed in the evening in the port of Le Havre, Seine Inférieure by Luftwaffe aircraft. Thirteen crew were killed.
Belgica	Norway	World War II: The depot ship was scuttled at Harstad, Norway by the Franco-British Expeditionary Force.
Erik Frisell	Sweden	World War II: The cargo ship was shelled and sunk in the Atlantic Ocean west of the Hebrides, United Kingdom (57°25′N 9°15′W) by U-37 (Kriegsmarine). All 34 crew were rescued by HMT Cobbers (Royal Navy).
HMS Princess Victoria	Royal Navy	World War II: The auxiliary minelayer struck a mine and sank off the mouth of the Humber with the loss of 36 of her 121 crew.
Vlaanderen IV	Belgium	World War II: The dredger was bombed and sunk in the North Sea off Dunkerque, Nord, France.
HMS Whitley	Royal Navy	World War II: The W-class destroyer was bombed and damaged off Ostend, West Flanders, Belgium by Luftwaffe aircraft. She was beached and later scuttled by HMS Keith (Royal Navy).

== 20 May ==
List of shipwrecks: 20 May 1940
Ship	State	Description
Almeria	Italy	The cargo ship struck a rock on the north coast of Trinidad. She was a total loss.
Antverpia	Belgium	World War II: The cargo ship was bombed and severely damaged in the English Channel off Boulogne, Pas-de-Calais, France, in a Luftwaffe air raid. She was beached on 21 May, but bombed again on 23 May and set on fire.
Deneb	Norway	World War II: The cargo ship was bombed and set on fire at Harstad in a Luftwaffe air raid. She was scuttled the next day by a British destroyer. Two of her crew were killed; eleven survived.
Hercule	France	World War II: The tugstruck a mine and sank at Calais. There was only one survivor.
Mavis	United Kingdom	World War II: The coaster was bombed and damaged in the English Channel off Calais by Luftwaffe aircraft. Three crew and one gunner were killed. She was later abandoned.
Ophélie	France	World War II: The tanker was anchored off Boulogne, Pas-de-Calais and was bombed in the evening by the Luftwaffe. She was beached but burned for the next three days and was a total loss. There were six dead and 34 survivors.
Orkney, and Söstjernen	Denmark	World War II: The fishing vessels were intercepted in the North Sea at 55°00′N 3°30′E by HMS Spearfish (Royal Navy). The crews of both vessels (four and three men) were taken off and they were sunk by gunfire.
Pembroke Coast	United Kingdom	World War II: The cargo ship was bombed and set on fire off Harstad, Norway by Luftwaffe aircraft. Two of her crew were killed. She was scuttled the next day.
HMT Rifsness	Royal Navy	World War II: The auxiliary minesweeper was bombed and sunk in the North Sea off Ostend, West Flanders, Belgium by Luftwaffe aircraft. Two of her four crew were killed, one was captured and the other was rescued by HMT Lord Inchcape (Royal Navy).

== 21 May ==
List of shipwrecks: 21 May 1940
Ship	State	Description
Barfleur	France	World War II: The tug was scuttled at Boulogne, Pas-de-Calais.
Bawtry	United Kingdom	World War II: The coaster was bombed and sunk at Dunkerque, Nord France, by Luftwaffe aircraft. She was later salvaged by the Germans and entered service as Rival.
HMT Cape Passaro	Royal Navy	World War II: The naval trawler was bombed and sunk off Narvik, Norway by Luftwaffe aircraft with the loss of four of her crew.
Clairy	Panama	World War II: The tanker was bombed and damaged in the English Channel off Boulogne by Luftwaffe aircraft. She sank the next day. Her crew were rescued.
CH-9	French Navy	World War II: The CH-5-class submarine chaser was bombed and severely damaged in the North Sea off Dunkerque (51°30′N 00°24′E). She was beached to prevent her sinking but was declared a total loss. Eleven of her 23 crew were wounded; one of them died of his wounds.
Christiane Cecile	French Navy	World War II: The auxiliary minesweeper was scuttled at Boulogne.
HMS Corburn	Royal Navy	World War II: The auxiliary minesweeper was torpedoed and sunk in the English Channel off Le Havre, Seine-Inférieure, France, by motor torpedo boat S-32 (Kriegsmarine).
De Normandie	Belgium	World War II: The fishing boat struck a mine and sank off Dieppe, Seine-Inférieure, with the loss of thirteen lives.
Ernestine Gabrielle	Belgium	World War II: The fishing boat was bombed and sunk at Dieppe by Luftwaffe aircraft.
Firth Fisher	United Kingdom	World War II: The coaster struck a mine in the English Channel off Boulogne and sank with the loss of seven of the eleven people aboard. Survivors were rescued by Sparta (United Kingdom).
Freddy	Belgium	World War II: The Castle-class trawler was sunk at Ostend by Luftwaffe aircraft. She was raised, repaired, and put in German service as M 3230 Freddy.
Georgette Simone	Belgium	World War II: The fishing boat was bombed and sunk at Dieppe by Luftwaffe aircraft.
Hubbastone	United Kingdom	World War II: The coasterwas bombed and sunk at Dieppe by Luftwaffe aircraft. She was later salvaged by the Germans, repaired and entered service as Jurgensby.
Independence	Belgium	World War II: The fishing boat was bombed and sunk at Dieppe by Luftwaffe aircraft.
Jacques Coeur	French Navy	World War II: The auxiliary minesweeper was bombed and sunk at Dunkerque by Luftwaffe aircraft.
L'Adroit	French Navy	World War II: The L'Adroit-class destroyer was bombed and sunk in the North Sea off Dunkerque by a Heinkel He 111 aircraft of the Luftwaffe.
La Lorientaise	French Navy	The naval trawler was sunk on this date.
Leopold Soubler	French Navy	World War II: The auxiliary minesweeper was scuttled at Boulogne.
HMHS Maid of Kent	Royal Navy	World War II: The hospital ship was bombed and sunk at Dieppe by Luftwaffe aircraft with the loss of 37 lives.
HMT Melbourne	Royal Navy	World War II: The naval trawler was bombed and sunk off Narvik, Norway by Luftwaffe aircraft. There were no casualties.
Nelly Suzanne	Belgium	World War II: The fishing boat was bombed and sunk at Dieppe by Luftwaffe aircraft.
Niger	French Navy	World War II: The tanker was bombed and sunk off Gravelines, Nord, by Luftwaffe aircraft with the loss of three of her 114 crew. Survivors were rescued by Cyclone (French Navy).
Notre Dame de Lorette	French Navy	World War II: The auxiliary minesweeper was bombed and sunk at Dunkerque by Luftwaffe aircraft.
Orme	French Navy	World War II: The Crabe-class tug (340 GRT, 1918) was scuttled at Boulogne. She was raised, repaired and put into German service as FH 02.
Pavon	France	World War II: The cargo ship was bombed and sunk in the English Channel off Calais by Luftwaffe aircraft. Her crew were rescued by Cyclone, Mistral and Sirocco (all French Navy).
Rien Sans Peine	French Navy	World War II: The auxiliary minesweeper was bombed and sunk at Dunkerque by Luftwaffe aircraft.
Saint Benoit	French Navy	World War II: The auxiliary minesweeper was bombed and sunk at Dunkerque by Luftwaffe aircraft.
Saint Joachim	French Navy	World War II: The auxiliary minesweeper was bombed and sunk at Dunkerque by Luftwaffe aircraft.
Salome	France	World War II: The tanker was bombed and sunk at Calais by Luftwaffe aircraft. Her crew were rescued by Cyclone, Mistral and Sirocco (all French Navy).
Spinel	United Kingdom	World War II: The cargo ship was bombed and sunk at Dunkerque by Luftwaffe aircraft. She was salvaged by the Germans on 4 July, repaired and entered German service.
Tumulte	French Navy	World War II: The Clameur-class tug was bombed and sunk at Dunkerque by Luftwaffe aircraft.

== 22 May ==
List of shipwrecks: 22 May 1940
Ship	State	Description
Aloha	Belgian Navy	World War II: The motor yacht (258 GRT) struck a mine and sank in the North Sea off Ostend, West Flanders with the loss of all sixteen people aboard (15 crew and the wife of one crew).
Bjarkøy	Norway	World War II: The coaster was bombed and sunk by German aircraft at Gratangsbotn. Her crew were then ashore and there were no casualties. She was raised in 1944, repaired and returned to service as Bogøy.
Efford	United Kingdom	The coaster (393 GRT) collided with Tlemcen (France) in the North Sea off Gravelines, Nord France, and sank.
Helene	Germany	World War II: The cargo ship struck a mine and sank in the Wadden Sea between Schiermonnikoog, Friesland and Simonszand, Groningen, Netherlands.
Palena	Chile	The cargo liner came ashore in a storm at Valparaíso and was wrecked.
Portrieux	France	World War II: The cargo ship (2,450 GRT) was bombed and set on fire in the North Sea off Gravelines by Luftwaffe aircraft. Eight crew were killed and nineteen survived. She sank two days later. The wreck was raised and scrapped in 2003.
Teaser	United Kingdom	World War II: The fishing smack struck a mine and sank in the River Blackwater off Tollesbury, Essex. Both crew were rescued.

== 23 May ==
List of shipwrecks: 23 May 1940
Ship	State	Description
Franz Haniel	Germany	World War II: The cargo ship struck a mine and sank in the Baltic Sea off Kiel.
Galaxias	Greece	World War II: The cargo ship was bombed and sunk in the English Channel off Dieppe, Seine-Inférieure, France, by Luftwaffe aircraft. Her crew were rescued. She was refloated in 1949 or 1950 and scrapped.
Jaguar	French Navy	World War II: Operation Dynamo: The Chacal-class destroyer was torpedoed and damaged in the North Sea off Dunkerque, Nord, by motor torpedo boats S-21 and S-23 (both Kriegsmarine) and beached (51°03′N 02°22′E). She was then destroyed by bombing with the loss of thirteen of her crew.
Orage	French Navy	World War II: The Bourrasque-class destroyer was bombed and sunk off Boulogne, Pas-de-Calais, by Luftwaffe aircraft. Twenty-eight crew were killed.
Sigurd Faulbaum	Belgian Navy	World War II: The cargo ship (3,256 GRT), a German ship seized on 10 May at Bruges, was torpedoed and sunk in the North Sea off the Noord Hinder Lightship (Netherlands) (51°29′N 2°38′E) by U-9 (Kriegsmarine). Her whole crew was rescued by Graaf Visart (Belgium).
Terieven	Denmark	World War II: The fishing vessel was intercepted in the North Sea (56°55′N 6°50′E) by HMS Tetrarch (Royal Navy) and was scuttled by her.

== 24 May ==
List of shipwrecks: 24 May 1940
Ship	State	Description
Brighton	United Kingdom	World War II: The hospital ship was bombed and sunk in the North Sea off Dieppe, Seine-Inférieure, France, by Luftwaffe aircraft. She had been bombed and severely damaged on 21 May. There were no crew aboard her.
Chacal	French Navy	World War II: The Chacal-class destroyer was bombed and sunk off Boulogne, Pas-de-Calais, by Junkers Ju 87 aircraft of I and II Staffeln, Sturzkampfgeschwader 2, Luftwaffe. Thirty-one crew were killed. Survivors were rescued by CH-5 and CH-42 (both French Navy).
Etoile du Nord	French Navy	World War II: The auxiliary minesweeper struck a mine and sank in the North Sea off Dunkerque, Nord, with the loss of 27 of her 30 crew.
HNoMS Ingrid	Royal Norwegian Navy	World War II: Norwegian Campaign: The patrol boat was sunk by Luftwaffe bombers at Bodø with the loss of a crew member.
Kyma	Greece	World War II: The cargo ship was torpedoed and sunk in the Atlantic Ocean south west of Land's End, Cornwall, United Kingdom (48°30′N 9°30′W) by U-37 (Kriegsmarine) with the loss of seven of her 30 crew.
Matelot	French Navy	World War II: The auxiliary minesweeper was bombed and sunk in the North Sea off Dunkerque by Luftwaffe aircraft.
Skjerstad	Norway	World War II: The troopship was bombed and sunk in Langsetfjorden, Norway by Junkers Ju 87 aircraft of the Luftwaffe. There were no casualties. She was declared beyond economic repair in mid-1940.
HMS Wessex	Royal Navy	World War II: The W-class destroyer was bombed and sunk off Calais, France, by Junkers Ju 87 aircraft of I and II staffel, Sturzkampfgeschwader 2, Luftwaffe while conducting a naval gunfire support mission. Five crew were killed and one died of wounds. Six survivors were rescued by HMS John Cattling, the rest of the survivors by HMS Vimiera (both Royal Navy).

== 25 May ==
List of shipwrecks: 25 May 1940
Ship	State	Description
HMT Charles Boyes	Royal Navy	World War II: The Castle-class minesweeping naval trawler struck a mine in the North Sea off Caister-on-Sea, Norfolk and sank with the loss of fifteen crew, 3 rescued.
Dyck	France	World War II: The lightship was sunk off Calais, France by Luftwaffe aircraft. Her crew were rescued.
Florentino	United Kingdom	World War II: The cargo ship was sunk as a blockship at Zeebrugge, West Flanders, Belgium.
Joseph Seep	Panama	World War II: The tanker struck a mine and sank while at anchor in Le Havre Roads, Seine-Inférieure, France. All 37 crew survived.
La Jeannine	French Navy	World War II: The auxiliary minesweeper was bombed and sunk at Dunkerque, Nord, by Luftwaffe aircraft.
Marguerite Rose	French Navy	World War II: The 144.6-foot (44.1 m), 409-ton minesweeping naval trawler was bombed and sunk at Dunkirk.
HMS Mashobra	Royal Navy	World War II: Operation Alphabet: The Fleet Air Arm depot ship was bombed off Harstad, Norway by Luftwaffe aircraft and was beached. She was scuttled on 8 June to prevent her being captured by German forces.
Montan 25	Kriegsmarine	The river Sperrbrecher was sunk on this date.
ORP Orzeł	Polish Navy	World War II: Norwegian Campaign: The Orzeł-class submarine struck a mine and sank in the North Sea (57°00′N 3°40′E) with the loss of all 60 crew.
Spinel	United Kingdom	World War II: The coaster was bombed and sunk at Dunkerque by Luftwaffe bombing. All nine crew were rescued. She was salvaged by the Germans on 4 July and taken as a prize of war.
Tennessee	Norway	The cargo ship was in collision with Baron Fairlie in the North Sea and was beached north west of Copinsay, Orkney Islands, United Kingdom. Salvage attempts were abandoned and she was declared a total loss.
Transeas	United Kingdom	World War II: The cargo ship was sunk as a blockship at Zeebrugge.
Trombe II	French Navy	World War II: The auxiliary minesweeper was bombed and sunk at Dunkerque by Luftwaffe aircraft.

== 26 May ==
List of shipwrecks: 26 May 1940
Ship	State	Description
Ceres	France	World War II: The cargo ship was bombed and sunk in the English Channel by Luftwaffe aircraft whilst on a voyage from Rouen, Seine-Inférieure to Dunkerque, Nord.
HMS Curlew	Royal Navy	World War II: Norwegian Campaign: The C-class cruiser was bombed and sunk in Ofotfjord off Narvik, Norway by Junkers Ju 88 aircraft of the Luftwaffe.
Dijonnais	French Navy	World War II: The auxiliary minesweeper was bombed and sunk at Dunkerque by Luftwaffe aircraft.
Florabell	Norway	World War II: Norwegian Campaign: The fishing vessel was torched and burnt at the shipyard in Rognan by retreating Norwegian and British forces.
HMS Loch Shin	Royal Navy	World War II: Norwegian Campaign: The boom defence vessel was bombed and sunk at Harstad, Norway.
RFA Oleander	Royal Fleet Auxiliary	World War II: The tanker was bombed off Harstad by Luftwaffe aircraft and beached. She was scuttled on 8 June to prevent her capture by German forces. Her 39 crew survived.
Saint Camille	France	World War II: The cargo ship struck a mine and sank in the North Sea off Dunkerque.
Vansø	Norway	World War II: The coaster struck a mine laid by Rubis (French Navy) and sank near Stavanger. One or two crew members were killed.
Volkgracht IV	Belgium	World War II: The dredger struck a mine and sank in the Zeebrugge Canal.

== 27 May ==
List of shipwrecks: 27 May 1940
Ship	State	Description
Aden	France	World War II: The cargo ship was bombed and sunk at Dunkerque, Nord France, in a Luftwaffe air raid.
Atlantic Guide	United Kingdom	World War II: The cargo ship was sunk as a blockship at Zeebrugge, West Flanders Belgium.
Borodino	United Kingdom	World War II: The refrigerated cargo liner was sunk as a blockship at Zeebrugge.
Cap Tafelneh	France	World War II: The cargo ship (2,266 GRT) was bombed and sunk at Dunkerque in a Luftwaffe air raid. She was refloated on 13 May 1941, repaired and entered German service as Carl Arp.
La Majo	French Navy	World War II: The auxiliary minesweeper was bombed and sunk in the North Sea off Dunkerque by Luftwaffe aircraft.
HMS LCM 10, HMS LCM 11, HMS LCM 14, HMS LCM 15, HMS LCM 18, HMS LCM 19, and HMS LCM 20	Royal Navy	The Landing Craft Mechanized were lost on this date.
Ocean Reward	Royal Navy	World War II: Operation Dynamo: The 86-foot (26 m), 95-ton minesweeping/Examination naval drifter collided with Isle of Thanet (United Kingdom) in the English Channel off Dover, Kent, and sank with the loss of all 12 hands.
Sequacity	United Kingdom	World War II: The coaster was shelled and sunk in the English Channel off Calais, France, (52°04′20″N 1°38′36″E) by German shore batteries. All thirteen crew were rescued by Yewdale (United Kingdom).
Sheaf Mead	United Kingdom	World War II: Convoy OG 31F: The cargo ship straggled behind the convoy. She was torpedoed and sunk in the Bay of Biscay (43°48′N 12°38′W) by U-37 (Kriegsmarine) with the loss of 31 of her 38 crew. Survivors were rescued by Frangoula B. Goulandri (Greece).
Uruguay	Argentina	World War II: The cargo ship was sunk in the Atlantic Ocean 100 nautical miles (190 km) west of Cape Finisterre, Spain (43°40′N 12°16′W) by an explosive charge placed by U-37 (Kriegsmarine) with the loss of fifteen of her 28 crew. Survivors were rescued by the fishing trawler Ramoncin (Spain).
Worthtown	United Kingdom	World War II: The coaster was bombed and sunk in the North Sea off Dunkerque by Luftwaffe aircraft. She was later salvaged by the Germans, repaired and entered service as Ilse Schulte.

== 28 May ==
List of shipwrecks: 28 May 1940
Ship	State	Description
Abukir	United Kingdom	World War II: Operation Dynamo: The coaster was torpedoed and sunk in the North Sea (51°29′N 2°16′E) by motor torpedo boat S-34 (Kriegsmarine) with the loss of 205 of the 231 people aboard. Survivors were rescued by HMS Codrington, HMS Jaguar and HMS Javelin (all Royal Navy).
Blaamannen	Norway	World War II: The cargo ship (174 GRT) struck a mine and sank off Haugesund, Norway with the loss of six of her crew.
Boy Roy	United Kingdom	World War II: Operation Dynamo: The drifter was bombed and damaged at Dunkerque, Nord, France, by Luftwaffe aircraft. She was beached and abandoned.
Brazza	France	World War II: The passenger ship was sunk by torpedo in the Atlantic Ocean (100 nautical miles (190 km)) off Porto, Portugal (42°43′N 11°00′W) by U-37 (Kriegsmarine) with the loss of 378 of the 575 people aboard. Survivors were rescued by Enseigne Henry (French Navy), screened by HMS Cheshire (Royal Navy).
HMS Brighton Belle	Royal Navy	World War II: Operation Dynamo: The paddle minesweeper struck a submerged wreck off Dunkerque and sank. All aboard were rescued by HMS Medway Queen (Royal Navy).
Carare	United Kingdom	World War II: The cargo liner struck a mine and sank in the English Channel north of Foreland Point (51°17′30″N 3°44′00″W) with the loss of ten of the 126 people aboard. Survivors were rescued by HMT Cambridgeshire and HMY Rhodora (both Royal Navy).
Girl Pamela	United Kingdom	World War II: Operation Dynamo: The drifter collided with another vessel at Dunkerque and sank.
Julien	France	World War II: The fishing trawler was shelled and sunk in the Atlantic Ocean off Cape Finisterre, Spain (42°50′N 10°40′W) by U-37 (Kriegsmarine). All ten crew were rescued.
Marguerite Rose	French Navy	World War II: Operation Dynamo: The auxiliary minesweeper was bombed and sunk in the North Sea off Dunkerque by Luftwaffe aircraft.
HMT Ocean Reward	Royal Navy	The naval trawler collided with Isle of Thanet (United Kingdom) in the English Channel off Dover, Kent and sank with the loss of a crew member.
Oona Hall	United Kingdom	The 105.3-foot (32.1 m), 158-ton steam fishing trawler was run down and sunk in the Irish Sea in heavy seas and mist west north west of Calf of Man, Isle of Man 6 miles off Peel by Villa D'Alger (French Navy). Eleven of her crew died, one survivor rescued by Villa D'Algeir.
Paxton	United Kingdom	World War II: Operation Dynamo: The drifter was bombed and damaged at Dunkerque by Luftwaffe aircraft. She was beached and abandoned.
Queen of the Channel	United Kingdom	World War II: Operation Dynamo: The passenger ship was bombed and sunk in the North Sea off Dunkerque (51°15′N 2°40′E) by Luftwaffe aircraft. All 920-plus people aboard were rescued by Dorrien Rose (United Kingdom).
HMT Thomas Bartlett	Royal Navy	World War II: Operation Dynamo: The naval trawler struck a mine in the English Channel off Calais, France, and sank with the loss of eight crew.
HMT Thuringia	Royal Navy	World War II: Operation Dynamo: The naval trawler struck a mine in the North Sea off the Belgian coast and sank. Only four crew survived.
Torsten	Sweden	World War II: The cargo ship struck a mine and sank in the Kattegat (57°33′N 11°35′E). All sixteen crew were rescued.

== 29 May ==
List of shipwrecks: 29 May 1940
Ship	State	Description
HMS Bideford	Royal Navy	World War II: Operation Dynamo: The Shoreham-class sloop was bombed and severely damaged at Dunkerque, Nord, France. She was beached to prevent her sinking. Seventee crew were lost. Survivors were rescued by HMS Kellet (Royal Navy). She was later refloated and towed by HMS Locust (Royal Navy) which was later relieved by Gondia and Simla (both United Kingdom), arriving at Dover, Kent on 31 May. HMS Bideford was subsequently repaired and returned to service.
HMT Calvi	Royal Navy	World War II: Operation Dynamo: The naval trawler (363 GRT, 1930) was bombed and sunk at Dunkerque with the loss of three of her crew. Survivors were rescued by HMT John Cattling (Royal Navy).
Clan Macalister	United Kingdom	World War II: Operation Dynamo: The cargo ship was bombed and sunk 2 nautical miles (3.7 km) off De Panne, West Flanders, Belgium, by Junkers Ju 87 aircraft of the Luftwaffe with the loss of eighteen of the 79 people on board. Survivors were rescued by HMS Malcolm and HMS Pangbourne (both Royal Navy).
HMT Comfort	Royal Navy	World War II: The naval drifter was fired on by HMS Grafton and HMS Lydd (both Royal Navy), then rammed and sunk by HMS Lydd, which mistook her for an E-boat. Six of her eleven crew were killed.
HMS Crested Eagle	Royal Navy	HMS Crested Eagle, 2019 World War II: Operation Dynamo: The auxiliary anti-aircraft ship was bombed and sunk off Dunkerque by Luftwaffe aircraft. Survivors were rescued by HMS Pangbourne (Royal Navy).
Douaisien	France	World War II: Operation Dynamo: The cargo ship was bombed and severely damaged in the North Sea off Dunkerque. She was subsequently bombed and sunk on 1 June. Also reported to have struck a mine and sunk with the loss of 3 lives, with approximately 1,250 survivors.
HMS Gracie Fields	Royal Navy	World War II: Operation Dynamo: The paddle minesweeper was bombed and sunk in the North Sea off Dunkerque by Luftwaffe aircraft with the loss of a crew member. Survivors were rescued by HMS Pangbourne (Royal Navy).
HMS Grafton	Royal Navy	World War II: Operation Dynamo: The G-class destroyer was torpedoed and damaged in the North Sea off Nieuwpoort, West Flanders (51°22′N 2°45′E) by U-62 (Kriegsmarine) with the loss of four of her 146 crew. She was subsequently scuttled by HMS Ivanhoe (Royal Navy).
HMS Grenade	Royal Navy	World War II: Operation Dynamo: The G-class destroyer was bombed and sunk at Dunkerque by Junkers Ju 87 aircraft of the Luftwaffe with the loss of eighteen of her 146 crew.
Joseph Marie	French Navy	World War II: Operation Dynamo: The auxiliary minesweeper was bombed and sunk at Dunkerque by Luftwaffe aircraft.
HMS LCA 4, HMS LCA 16, and HMS LCA 18	Royal Navy	World War II: Operation Dynamo: The Landing Craft Assaults were lost when Clan Macalister (United Kingdom) was sunk.
Lorina	United Kingdom	World War II: Operation Dynamo: The passenger ship was bombed and sunk off Dunkerque by Luftwaffe aircraft with the loss of eight of her crew.
Marie José	France	World War II: The cargo ship was torpedoed, shelled and sunk in the Atlantic Ocean 40 nautical miles (74 km) north west of Vigo, Spain by U-37 (Kriegsmarine).
Mars	France	World War II: Operation Dynamo: The coaster was bombed and sunk at Dunkerque by Luftwaffe aircraft.
Mona's Queen	United Kingdom	Mona's Queen World War II: Operation Dynamo: The ferry was bombed and sunk off Dunkerque with the loss of 26 lives. Survivors were rescued by HMS Vanquisher (Royal Navy).
Monique Schiaffino	France	World War II: Operation Dynamo: The cargo ship was bombed and sunk at Dunkerque by Luftwaffe aircraft.
HMS Montrose	Royal Navy	The Scott-class destroyer collided with Sun V (United Kingdom) in the English Channel off Cap Griz Nez, Pas-de-Calais, France, and was severely damaged. She was beached to prevent her sinking. Later refloated and towed back to Dover by Lady Brassey and Simla (both United Kingdom).
Nautilus	United Kingdom	World War II: Operation Dynamo: The drifter was sunk in the North Sea off Dunkerque due to enemy action.
Perrakis L. Cambansis	Greece	World War II: The cargo ship was bombed and sunk at Dieppe, Seine-Inférieure, France by Luftwaffe aircraft. She was refloated, repaired and entered German service as Herta Engeline Fritzen.
HMT Polly Johnson	Royal Navy	World War II: Operation Dynamo: The naval trawler was bombed and severely damaged in the North Sea off Dunkerque by Luftwaffe aircraft with the loss of a crew member. She was later scuttled.
Samson	French Navy	World War II: The tug struck a mine in the Mediterranean Sea and sank off the coast of Gard.
Saint-Clair	France	World War II: The cargo ship was bombed and sunk in Tjeldsundet, Norway by Luftwaffe aircraft.
Saint Octave	France	Saint Octave World War II: The cargo ship was scuttled at Dunkerque. She was refloated on 18 August, repaired and entered German service as Ilse Fritzen.
Telena	United Kingdom	World War II: The tanker was shelled and set on fire in the Atlantic Ocean off Muros, Spain (42°25′N 9°08′W) by U-37 (Kriegsmarine). She was beached and abandoned by her crew. Her master and seventeen of her 36 crew were killed, the survivors were rescued by the fishing trawlers Buena Esperanza and Jose Ignacio de C. (both Spain). She was later seized by Spain and towed to Vigo, where her cargo was salvaged and then towed to Bilbao for repairs. She entered Spanish service in 1941 as Gerona.
Vulcain	Belgium	World War II: Operation Dynamo: The tug was bombed and sunk at Dunkerque by Luftwaffe aircraft.
HMS Wakeful	Royal Navy	World War II: Operation Dynamo: The W-class destroyer was torpedoed and sunk in the North Sea (51°20′N 2°45′E) by E-boat S 30 (Kriegsmarine) with the loss of 724 of the 750 people aboard. Survivors were rescued by the drifters Comfort and Nautilus (both United Kingdom), HMS Grafton and HMT Gossamer (both Royal Navy).
HMS Waverley	Royal Navy	World War II: Operation Dynamo: The paddle minesweeper was bombed and sunk at Dunkerque by Luftwaffe aircraft with the loss of about 360 people. Survivors were rescued by Cyclone (French Navy), HMS Golden Eagle (Royal Navy), two drifters and a tug.

== 30 May ==
List of shipwrecks: 30 May 1940
Ship	State	Description
Ambleve	United Kingdom	World War II: Operation Dynamo: The canal boat ran aground at Dunkerque, Nord, France, and was abandoned.
Bourrasque	French Navy	Bourrasque World War II: Operation Dynamo: The Bourrasque-class destroyer struck a mine off Nieuwpoort, West Flanders Belgium and was severely damaged. She was then sunk by German artillery fire. She was carrying 1000-1100 troops and about 500 lives were lost.
HMS Cambrian	Royal Navy	World War II: The boom defence vessel struck a mine in the Solent off Spithead, Hampshire, and sank with the loss of 24 of her 26 crew.
Correnie	United Kingdom	The fishing trawler was lost in the North Sea.
Edv. Nissen	United Kingdom	World War II: The cargo ship was sunk as a blockship at Dunkerque.
Fenella	United Kingdom	World War II: Operation Dynamo: The passenger ship sank due to bomb damage she suffered in an attack the previous day off Dunkerque, by Luftwaffe aircraft. Fifteen of her crew had been killed in the attack.
Finkenau	Germany	World War II: The cargo ship struck a mine and sank off Drogden, Denmark.
HMS King Orry	Royal Navy	World War II: Operation Dynamo: The armed boarding vessel was shelled and sunk off Dunkerque. Survivors were rescued by HMT Lord Grey, HMT Vivacious (both Royal Navy) and other small boats.
Mode	Sweden	World War II: The fishing boat was sunk by a mine off Hönö with the loss of two lives.
Normannia	United Kingdom	World War II: Operation Dynamo: The passenger ship was bombed and severely damaged in the North Sea 4 nautical miles (7.4 km) off Dunkerque by Heinkel aircraft of the Luftwaffe. She was beached and abandoned.
Stanhall	United Kingdom	World War II: The cargo ship was torpedoed and sunk in the English Channel south of The Lizard, Cornwall (48°59′N 5°17′W) by U-101 (Kriegsmarine) with the loss of one of her 37 crew. Survivors were rescued by Temple Moat (United Kingdom).
Thames	Belgium	World War II: Operation Dynamo: The tug was bombed and sunk at Dunkerque by Luftwaffe aircraft. She was subsequently salvaged by the Germans and repaired.
V 1109 Antares	Kriegsmarine	World War II: The vorpostenboot (291 GRT) struck a mine laid by HMS Narwhal (Royal Navy) and sank in the North Sea off Haugesund, Norway (62°58′N 6°48′E). Eighteen men were rescued (including five wounded) but seventeen were reported missing, including the Norwegian pilot.
Yser	United Kingdom	World War II: Operation Dynamo: The canal boat ran aground at Dunkerque and was abandoned.

== 31 May ==
List of shipwrecks: 31 May 1940
Ship	State	Description
Adjader	France	World War II: Operation Dynamo: The fishing trawler was bombed and sunk at Dunkerque, Nord, by Luftwaffe aircraft.
Aïn el Turk	France	World War II: Operation Dynamo: The cargo ship was sunk at Dunkerque by German artillery.
Costaud	France	World War II: Operation Dynamo: The fishing trawler was bombed and sunk at Dunkerque by Luftwaffe aircraft.
Côte d'Azur	France	World War II: Operation Dynamo: The cargo ship was bombed and sunk at Dunkerque by Luftwaffe aircraft. She was later salvaged by the Germans, repaired and entered service as Elsass.
HMS Devonia	Royal Navy	HMS Devonia, 2019 World War II: Operation Dynamo: The minesweeper was bombed and severely damaged off Dunkerque. She was beached and abandoned at La Panne, West Flanders, Belgium.
HMS Grive	Royal Navy	World War II: Operation Dynamo: The armed yacht was bombed and damaged at Dunkerque by Luftwaffe aircraft. She then struck a mine and sank with the loss of all hands.
Jadarland	Norway	World War II: The cargo liner struck a mine and sank off Slettå, Norway. with the loss of nineteen lives.
HMS LCA 8, and LCA 15	Royal Navy	World War II: Operation Dynamo: The Landing Craft Assaults were lost when HMS Devonia (Royal Navy) was sunk.
Orangemoor	United Kingdom	World War II: Convoy HGF 31: The cargo ship was torpedoed and sunk in the English Channel south of Start Point, Devon (49°53′N 3°23′W) by U-101 (Kriegsmarine) with the loss of eighteen of her 40 crew. Survivors were rescued by Brandenburg (United Kingdom).
Puissant	France	World War II: Operation Dynamo: The fishing trawler was bombed and sunk at Dunkerque by Luftwaffe aircraft.
Sirocco	French Navy	World War II: Operation Dynamo: The Bourrasque-class destroyer was torpedoed and severely damaged in the North Sea off the West Hinder sandbank (51°18′N 2°15′E) by S-23 and S-26 (both Kriegsmarine). She was then bombed and sunk by Junkers Ju 88 aircraft of the Luftwaffe with the loss of over 600 troops and 59 crewmen. Fifteen survivors were rescued by ORP Błyskawica (Polish Navy), 21 by HMT Stella Dorado, 50 by HMS Wolves, and 166 by HMS Widgeon (all Royal Navy).
HMT St. Achilleus	Royal Navy	World War II: Operation Dynamo: The naval trawler struck a mine and sank in the North Sea off Dunkerque with the loss of a crew member.(Look 01/06/1940)
U-13	Kriegsmarine	World War II: The Type IIB submarine as depth charged and sunk in the North Sea 14 nautical miles (26 km) south-east of Lowestoft, Suffolk, United Kingdom (52°27′N 2°02′E) by HMS Weston (Royal Navy). Her crew were rescued and made prisoners of war.
X 213, and X 149	Royal Navy	The X-class lighters were lost on this date.

== Unknown date ==
List of shipwrecks: Unknown date 1940
Ship	State	Description
Ruytingen Lightship	France	World War II: The lightship was bombed and sunk in the North Sea off Dunkerque.
