= French submarine Calypso (Q126) =

History

France
- Name: Calypso
- Namesake: Calypso, a nymph in Greek mythology
- Builder: Chantiers Schneider et Cie, Chalon-sur-Saône, France
- Laid down: 7 February 1924
- Launched: 15 or 28 January 1926
- Commissioned: 12 May 1928 or June 1929
- Fate: Seized by Germany 8 December 1942; Transferred to Italy 22 December 1942; Sunk 31 January 1943

General characteristics
- Class & type: Circé-class coastal submarine
- Displacement: 615 tons normal (surfaced); 776 ton (submerged)
- Length: 62.48 m (204.99 ft)
- Beam: 6.2 m (20.34 ft)
- Draught: 3.99 m (13.09 ft)
- Propulsion: Diesel/electric; 2 shafts; 1,200 bhp (895 kW) diesel (surfaced); 1,000 shp (746 kW) electric (submerged)
- Speed: 14 knots (26 km/h; 16 mph) (surfaced); 7.5 knots (13.9 km/h; 8.6 mph) (submerged)
- Range: 3,500 miles
- Capacity: 60t (oil)
- Complement: 41
- Armament: 7 × 550 mm (22 in) torpedo tubes; 1 × 75 mm (3 in) deck gun; 2 × 13.2 mm (0.52 in) machine guns

Calypso (Q126) was a Circé-class submarine in commission in the French Navy from the late 1920s until 1942. She saw service in World War II, first on the side of the Allies from September 1939 to June 1940, then in the forces of Vichy France. After being seized by Nazi Germany in December 1942 and transferred to Italy, she was sunk in January 1943.

== Construction and commissioning ==
Laid down by Chantiers Schneider et Cie at Chalon-sur-Saône, France, on 7 February 1924 with the pennant number Q126, Calypso was launched on either 15 or 28 January 1926, according to different sources. She was commissioned on either 12 May 1928 or in June 1929, according to different sources.

== Service history ==
=== French Navy ===
When World War II began with Nazi Germany′s invasion of Poland on 1 September 1939, Calypso was part of the 13th Submarine Division of the 5th Submarine Squadron in the 1st Flotilla of the 2nd Squadron along with her sister ships Circé, Doris, and Thétis at Toulon, France. France entered the war on 3 September 1939.

In 1940, the Allies made plans to intervene in Norway to prevent the shipment of iron ore from Sweden to Germany via Narvik on the Norwegian coast. Twelve French submarines were to participate in the operation, including the four submarines of the 13th Division, under the overall command of Royal Navy Vice Admiral Max Horton. Accordingly, Calypso and Thétis got underway from Bizerte, Tunisia, on 23 March 1940 and proceeded to Harwich, England, where the French Navy submarine tender Jules Verne was to support them as they patrolled the Heligoland Bight and the southern North Sea in support of the Norway operation.

The Allies′ plans for Norway took on greater urgency on 9 April 1940, when Germany began Operation Weserübung, its invasion of Norway and Denmark. Circé arrived at Harwich on 14 April and Doris on 20 April to join Calypso and Thétis in supporting Allied operations in Norway. The French submarines found limited facilities available to them at Harwich and had to rely largely on Jules Verne and spare parts sent from Cherbourg in France for repairs, some of which never were completed.

By 6 May 1940, the Allies had indications that a German invasion of the Netherlands was imminent, and that day Horton ordered all available submarines to put to sea. Four French submarines, including Calypso, received orders to join four British and two Polish submarines in forming a patrol line off the coast of the Netherlands to find and attack German submarines believed to be operating in the area. The Battle of France began when German ground forces advanced into France, the Netherlands, Belgium, and Luxembourg on 10 May 1940. Calypso was forced to take evasive action to avoid torpedoes fired by German submarines during her patrols in the area.

On 4 June 1940, Jules Verne and all the French submarines assigned to her at Harwich departed Harwich and proceeded to Brest, France. Italy declared war on France on 10 June 1940 and joined the invasion of France that day. As German ground forces approached Brest on 18 June 1940, all French ships received orders at 18:00 to evacuate the port, with those unable to get underway ordered to scuttle themselves. At 18:30, Jules Verne and 13 submarines, including Calypso, got underway from Brest bound for Casablanca, French Morocco, which they reached on 23 June 1940.

The Battle of France ended in France's defeat and armistice with Germany and Italy, which went into effect on 25 June 1940. On that day, Calypso, Circé, and Thétis were still part of the 13th Submarine Division, based at Toulon but assigned to overseas duty in "Africa and the Levant."

=== Vichy France ===
After the armistice went into effect, Calypso served in the naval forces of Vichy France. The attack on Mers-el-Kébir — in which a British Royal Navy squadron attacked a French Navy squadron moored at the naval base at Mers El Kébir near Oran on the coast of Algeria — took place on 3 July 1940, and in its aftermath the French began to maintain a standing submarine patrol off Casablanca. The submarines Casabianca, Poncelet, and Sfax conducted the patrols from 6 to 18 July 1940, when Calypso and the submarines Amphitrite, and Méduse relieved them.

By 1 November 1942, Calypso was at Bizerte with eight other French submarines, under guard in an unarmed and unfueled status in accordance with the terms of the 1940 armistice. On 8 November, Allied forces landed in French North Africa in Operation Torch. Fighting between the Allies and Vichy French forces in North Africa ended on 11 November, and French forces in Africa began to join the forces of Free France. On 14 November the French maritime prefect of the 4th Region at Algiers in Algeria ordered French naval forces at Bizerte to move to Algiers, but on 15 November Vichy French authorities countermanded the order and instructed French forces at Bizerte to obey only orders they issued. To avoid bombardment by American forces, the French submarines anchored at the Sidi Abdallah Arsenal at Ferryville, Tunisia.

On 8 December 1942, the Germans seized Calypso. They handed her over to the Italians on 22 December 1942. United States Army Air Forces B-17 Flying Fortress bombers of the Twelfth Air Force sank her at the North Pier at Ferryville on 31 January 1943.
