= French submarine Circé (Q125) =

History

France
- Name: Circé
- Namesake: Circe, an enchantress and minor goddess in Greek mythology
- Ordered: 30 June 1922
- Builder: Chantiers Schneider et Cie, Chalon-sur-Saône, France
- Laid down: 15 January 1924
- Launched: 29 October 1925
- Commissioned: 29 January 1927, 22 March 1929, or June 1929 (see text)
- Fate: Seized by Germany 8 December 1942; Transferred to Italy 22 December 1942

Italy
- Name: FR117
- Acquired: 22 December 1942
- Fate: Scuttled 6 May 1943

General characteristics
- Class & type: Circé-class coastal submarine
- Displacement: 615 tons normal (surfaced); 776 ton (submerged)
- Length: 62.48 m (204.99 ft)
- Beam: 6.2 m (20.34 ft)
- Draught: 3.99 m (13.09 ft)
- Propulsion: Diesel/electric; 2 shafts; 1,200 bhp (895 kW) diesel (surfaced); 1,000 shp (746 kW) electric (submerged)
- Speed: 14 knots (26 km/h; 16 mph) (surfaced); 7.5 knots (13.9 km/h; 8.6 mph) (submerged)
- Range: 3,500 miles
- Capacity: 60t (oil)
- Complement: 41
- Armament: 7 × 550 mm (22 in) torpedo tubes; 1 × 75 mm (3 in) deck gun; 2 × 13.2 mm (0.52 in) machine guns

Circé (Q125) was a Circé-class submarine in commission in the French Navy from the late 1920s until 1942. She saw service in World War II, first on the side of the Allies from September 1939 to June 1940, then in the forces of Vichy France. Nazi Germany seized her in December 1942 and transferred to Italy, who renamed her FR117. FR117 was scuttled in May 1943.

== Construction and commissioning ==
Ordered on 30 June 1922 and laid down by Chantiers Schneider et Cie at Chalon-sur-Saône, France, on 15 January 1924 with the pennant number Q125, Circé was launched on 29 October 1925. She was commissioned either on 29 January 1927, on 22 March 1929, or in June 1929, according to different sources.

== Service history ==
=== French Navy ===
==== Pre-World War II ====
The 20 June 1935 edition of Le Petit Marocain reported that Circé was a unit of the 5th Submarine Squadron and had arrived at Casablanca in French Morocco, joining the 3rd Submarine Squadron there.

==== World War II ====
When World War II began with Nazi Germany′s invasion of Poland on 1 September 1939, Circé was part of the 13th Submarine Division of the 5th Submarine Squadron in the 1st Flotilla of the 2nd Squadron along with her sister ships Calypso, Doris, and Thétis at Toulon, France. France entered the war on 3 September 1939.

In 1940, the Allies made plans to intervene in Norway to prevent the shipment of iron ore from Sweden to Germany via Narvik on the Norwegian coast. Twelve French submarines were to participate in the operation, including the four submarines of the 13th Submarine Division, under the overall command of Royal Navy Vice Admiral Max Horton. Accordingly, Calypso and Thétis got underway from Bizerte, Tunisia, on 23 March 1940 and proceeded to Harwich, England, where the French Navy submarine tender Jules Verne was to support them as they patrolled the Heligoland Bight and the southern North Sea in support of the Norway operation.

The Allies′ plans for Norway took on greater urgency on 9 April 1940, when Germany began Operation Weserübung, its invasion of Norway and Denmark. Circé arrived at Harwich on 14 April and Doris on 20 April to join Calypso and Thétis in supporting Allied operations in Norway. The French submarines found limited facilities available to them at Harwich and had to rely largely on Jules Verne and spare parts sent from Cherbourg in France for repairs, some of which never were completed.

By 6 May 1940, the Allies had indications that a German invasion of the Netherlands was imminent, and that day Horton ordered all available submarines to put to sea. Four French submarines, including Circé, received orders to join four British and two Polish submarines in forming a patrol line off the coast of the Netherlands to find and attack German submarines believed to be operating in the area. The Battle of France began when German ground forces advanced into France, the Netherlands, Belgium, and Luxembourg on 10 May 1940. On 17 May 1940, the French submarine Sibylle collided with Circé while submerging.

On 4 June 1940, Jules Verne and all the French submarines assigned to her at Harwich departed Harwich and proceeded to Brest, France. Italy declared war on France on 10 June 1940 and joined the invasion of France that day. As German ground forces approached Brest on 18 June 1940, all French ships received orders at 18:00 to evacuate the port, with those unable to get underway ordered to scuttle themselves. At 18:30, Jules Verne and 13 submarines, including Circé, got underway from Brest bound for Casablanca, which they reached on 23 June 1940.

The Battle of France ended in France's defeat and armistice with Germany and Italy, which went into effect on 25 June 1940. On that day, Circé, Calypso, and Thétis were still part of the 13th Submarine Division, based at Toulon but assigned to overseas duty in "Africa and the Levant."

=== Vichy France ===
After the armistice went into effect, Circé served in the naval forces of Vichy France. In December 1940, she was disarmed and placed under guard at Bizerte, Tunisia, in accordance with the terms of the 1940 armistice. On 1 November 1942, she was still at Bizerte with eight other French submarines, under guard in an unarmed and unfueled status.

On 8 November 1942, Allied forces landed in French North Africa in Operation Torch, and that day the French naval commander at Bizerte ordered the reactivation of Circé and three other submarines. Fighting between the Allies and Vichy French forces in North Africa ended on 11 November, and French forces in Africa began to join the forces of Free France. On 14 November the French maritime prefect of the 4th Region at Algiers in Algeria ordered French naval forces at Bizerte to move to Algiers, but on 15 November Vichy French authorities countermanded the order and instructed French forces at Bizerte to obey only orders they issued. To avoid bombardment by American forces, the French submarines anchored at the Sidi Abdallah Arsenal at Ferryville, Tunisia.

The Germans seized Circé on 8 December 1942. They handed her over to the Italians on 22 December 1942.

=== Italy ===
The Regia Marina (Italian Royal Navy) renamed the submarine FR117. United States Army Air Forces B-17 Flying Fortress bombers of the Twelfth Air Force damaged her at Ferryville on 31 January 1943. The Italians made plans to tow her to Italy, but she still was in Tunisia in May 1943 in the closing days of the Tunisian campaign. To prevent her capture by approaching Allied forces, the Italians scuttled FR117 in the channel at Bizerte on 6 May 1943.
