= French submarine Thétis =

French Navy submarine

History

France
- Name: Thétis
- Namesake: Thetis, a sea nymph in Greek mythology
- Builder: Chantiers Schneider et Cie, Bordeaux, France
- Laid down: 1 February 1924
- Launched: 30 June 1927
- Commissioned: June 1929
- Fate: Scuttled 27 November 1942; Seized by Germany; Transferred to Italy; Refloated 1 March 1943; Seized by Germany September 1943; Transferred to Vichy France 4 July 1944; Sank 6 August 1944; Refloated September 1945; Scrapped

General characteristics
- Class & type: Circé-class coastal submarine
- Displacement: 615 tons normal (surfaced); 776 ton (submerged)
- Length: 62.48 m (204.99 ft)
- Beam: 6.2 m (20.34 ft)
- Draught: 3.99 m (13.09 ft)
- Propulsion: Diesel/electric; 2 shafts; 1,200 bhp (895 kW) diesel (surfaced); 1,000 shp (746 kW) electric (submerged)
- Speed: 14 knots (26 km/h; 16 mph) (surfaced); 7.5 knots (13.9 km/h; 8.6 mph) (submerged)
- Range: 3,500 miles
- Capacity: 60t (oil)
- Complement: 41
- Armament: 7 × 550 mm (22 in) torpedo tubes; 1 × 75 mm (3 in) deck gun; 2 × 13.2 mm (0.52 in) machine guns

Thétis (Q134) was a Circé-class submarine in commission in the French Navy from 1929 until 1942. She saw service in World War II, first on the side of the Allies from September 1939 to June 1940, then in the forces of Vichy France until she was scuttled in November 1942.

== Construction and commissioning ==
Laid down by Chantiers Schneider et Cie at Bordeaux, France, on 1 February 1924 with the pennant number Q134, Thétis was launched on 30 June 1927. While she was fitting out at Toulon, France, a compressed air tank exploded aboard her on the afternoon of 7 March 1929, seriously injuring a crewman, who was hospitalized with one arm torn off and bruises over his entire body. She was commissioned in June 1929.

== Service history ==
=== French Navy ===
In 1937, Thétis sank the decommissioned armored cruiser Jules Michelet as a target.

When World War II began with Nazi Germany′s invasion of Poland on 1 September 1939, Thétis was part of the 13th Submarine Division of the 5th Submarine Squadron in the 1st Flotilla of the 2nd Squadron along with her sister ships Calypso, Circé, and Doris at Toulon. France entered the war on 3 September 1939.

In 1940, the Allies made plans to intervene in Norway to prevent the shipment of iron ore from Sweden to Germany via Narvik on the Norwegian coast. Twelve French submarines were to participate in the operation, including the four submarines of the 13th Division, under the overall command of Royal Navy Vice Admiral Max Horton. Accordingly, Thétis and Calypso got underway from Bizerte, Tunisia, on 23 March 1940 and proceeded to Harwich, England, where the French Navy submarine tender Jules Verne was to support them as they patrolled the Heligoland Bight and the southern North Sea in support of the Norway operation.

The Allies′ plans for Norway took on greater urgency on 9 April 1940, when Germany began Operation Weserübung, its invasion of Norway and Denmark. Circé arrived at Harwich on 14 April and Doris on 20 April to join Calypso and Thétis in supporting Allied operations in Norway. The French submarines found limited facilities available to them at Harwich and had to rely largely on Jules Verne and spare parts sent from Cherbourg in France for repairs, some of which never were completed.

By 6 May 1940, the Allies had indications that a German invasion of the Netherlands was imminent, and that day Horton ordered all available submarines to put to sea. Four French submarines, including Thétis, received orders to join four British and two Polish submarines in forming a patrol line off the coast of the Netherlands to find and attack German submarines believed to be operating in the area. The Battle of France began when German ground forces advanced into France, the Netherlands, Belgium, and Luxembourg on 10 May 1940.

On 4 June 1940, Jules Verne and all the French submarines assigned to her at Harwich departed Harwich and proceeded to Brest, France. Italy declared war on France on 10 June 1940 and joined the invasion of France that day. As German ground forces approached Brest on 18 June 1940, all French ships received orders at 18:00 to evacuate the port, with those unable to get underway ordered to scuttle themselves. At 18:30, Jules Verne and 13 submarines, including Thétis, got underway from Brest bound for Casablanca, French Morocco, which they reached on 23 June 1940.

The Battle of France ended in France's defeat and armistice with Germany and Italy, which went into effect on 25 June 1940. On that day, Thétis, Calypso, and Circé were still part of the 13th Submarine Division, based at Toulon but assigned to overseas duty at Casablanca.

=== Vichy France ===
After the armistice went into effect, Thétis served in the naval forces of Vichy France. By 1 November 1942, she was at Toulon, under guard in an unarmed and unfueled status in accordance with the terms of the 1940 armistice.

On 8 November 1942, Allied forces landed in French North Africa in Operation Torch. On 9 November, the Armistice Commission authorized the reactivation of Vichy French vessels at Toulon, including Thétis, to defend Toulon against any Allied attack there. Thétis was not yet able get underway when Germany and Italy occupied the Free Zone (French: Zone libre) of Vichy France on 27 November 1942, and she was among the French vessels scuttled at Toulon to prevent their seizure by Germany when German forces entered Toulon that day.

== Later disposition ==
The Germans seized Thétis and handed her over to the Italians, who refloated her on 1 March 1943, with the Mario Serra Company of Genoa carrying out the salvage operation. She was not repaired. The Germans seized her again when Italy surrendered to the Allies in September 1943. They handed her over to Vichy French authorities on 4 July 1944.

Thétis sank on 6 August 1944, either because of neglect or due to damage inflicted by bombs during an Allied air raid. She was refloated in September 1945 and subsequently scrapped.
