= HMS Cambrian =

Five ships of the Royal Navy have borne the name HMS Cambrian, after Cambria, the classical name for Wales:

- HMS Cambrian (1797) was a 40-gun fifth rate launched in 1797 and wrecked in 1828.
- HMS Cambrian (1841) was a 36-gun fifth rate launched in 1841. She was hulked in 1872, converted into a floating factory in 1880 and was sold in 1892.
- HMS Cambrian (1893) was an Astraea-class second class cruiser launched in 1893. She was used as a base ship from 1916, being renamed HMS Harlech. She was renamed HMS Vivid in 1921 and was sold in 1923.
- HMS Cambrian (1916) was a C-class light cruiser launched in 1916 and sold in 1934.
- HMS Cambrian (1939) was a fishing trawler launchedin 1924; requisitioned in 1939 as a boom defence vessel, she was sunk by a mine in 1940.
- HMS Cambrian (R85) was a C-class destroyer. She was laid down as HMS Spitfire, but was renamed before her launch in 1943. She was sold in 1971.
