= French submarine Sibylle (Q175) =

French Navy submarine

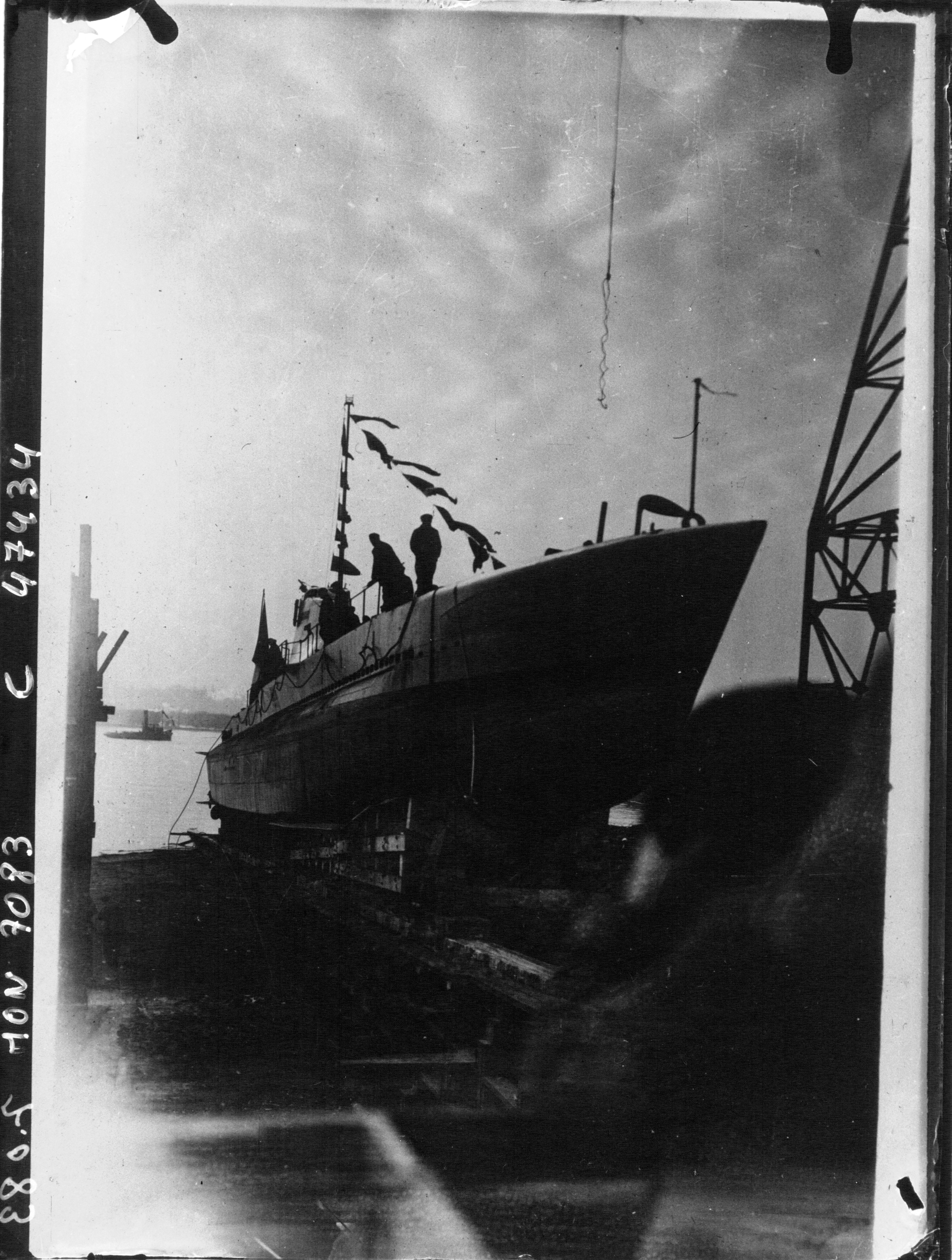
- La Sibylle being launched in January 1933 at Le Trait

History

France
- Name: Sibylle
- Namesake: Sibyl, a prophetess or oracle in Ancient Greece
- Builder: Chantiers Worms le Trait, Rouen, France
- Laid down: 10 January 1931
- Launched: 28 January 1933
- Commissioned: 22 December 1934
- Fate: Missing 8 November 1942

General characteristics
- Class & type: Diane-class submarine
- Displacement: 571 long tons (580 t) (surfaced); 809 long tons (822 t) (submerged)
- Length: 64.4 m (211 ft 3 in) overall
- Beam: 6.2 m (20 ft 4 in)
- Draft: 4.3 m (14 ft 1 in)
- Installed power: 1,400 bhp (1,000 kW) (diesel); 1,000 hp (746 kW) (electric motor)
- Propulsion: Diesel-electric; 1 × diesel engine; 1 × electric motor
- Speed: 14 knots (26 km/h; 16 mph) surfaced; 9 knots (17 km/h; 10 mph) submerged
- Range: 4,000 nmi (7,400 km; 4,600 mi) at 10 knots (19 km/h; 12 mph) surfaced; 82 nmi (152 km; 94 mi) at 5 knots (9.3 km/h; 5.8 mph) submerged
- Crew: 41
- Armament: 6 × 533 mm (21 in) torpedo tubes; 2 × 400 mm (15.7 in) torpedo tubes; 1 × 76 mm (3.0 in) deck gun

Sibylle (Q175) was a Diane-class submarine of the French Navy commissioned in 1934. During World War II, she operated on the Allied side until 1940, when she became part of the naval forces of Vichy France. She disappeared during Operation Torch, the Allied invasion of French North Africa, in November 1942.

French and other sources sometimes refer to the submarine by the formal name La Sibylle, either instead of or interchangeably with Sibyllé.

== Design and description ==
Sibylle was one of nine Diane-class submarines built for the French Navy during the 1930s.The Diane-class submarines were improved versions of the earlier Argonaute class. They displaced 661 tonnes (651 long tons) surfaced and 820 tonnes (807 long tons) submerged. The submarines were 64.4 meters (211 ft 3 in) long, had a beam of 6.2 meters (20 ft 4 in) and a draft of 4.3 meters (14 ft 1 in).

For surface running, the submarines were powered by two 700-brake-horsepower (522 kW) diesel engines, each driving one propeller shaft. When submerged each propeller was driven by a 500-horsepower (373 kW) electric motor. They could reach 14 knots (26 km/h; 16 mph) on the surface and 9 knots (17 km/h; 10 mph) underwater. On the surface, the Dianes had a range of 4,000 nautical miles (7,400 km; 4,600 mi) at 10 knots (19 km/h; 12 mph); submerged, they had a range of 82 nmi (152 km; 94 mi) at 5 knots (9.3 km/h; 5.8 mph).

The submarines were armed with six 53.3-centimeter (21.0 in) and a pair of 40-centimeter (15.7 in) torpedo tubes. Three of the former were mounted in the bow internally, two were external amidships, and one was external in the stern. The 40 cm tubes were aft and were also external; all of the external mounts could traverse. They carried a total of nine torpedoes. The Diane class also had a single 76-millimeter (3 in) deck gun.

== Construction and commissioning ==
Sybille was authorized in the 1929 naval program, and her keel was laid down at Chantiers Worms le Trait in Rouen, France, on 10 January 1931. She was launched on 28 January 1933 and commissioned at Cherbourg, France, on 22 December 1934.

== Service history ==
=== French Navy ===
When World War II began on 1 September 1939 with the German invasion of Poland, Sibylle was part of the 16th Submarine Division — along with her sister ships Amazone, Antiope, and Orphée — under the command of Maritime prefecture I and based at the Submarine Center at Cherbourg. France entered the war on the side of the Allies on 3 September 1939.

In 1940 the Allies made plans to intervene in Norway to prevent the shipment of iron ore from Sweden to Germany via Narvik on the Norwegian coast. Twelve French submarines were to participate in the operation, including the four submarines of the 16th Division, under the overall command of Royal Navy Vice Admiral Max Horton. Accordingly, all four submarines of the 16th Submarine Division got underway in company with the French Navy submarine tender Jules Verne and proceeded to Harwich, England, where they arrived on 22 March 1940. At Harwich, they formed the 10th Flotilla under Horton's command. The four submarines patrolled in the North Sea off the coast of the Netherlands until 7 April 1940 without success.

On 8 April 1940 German U-boats began operations in accordance with Operationsbefehl Hartmut ("Operation Order Hartmut") in support of Operation Weserübung, the German invasion of Norway and Denmark. Allied operations related to Norway became of greater urgency when the German invasion of both countries began on 9 April 1940. As they supported Allied operations in the Norwegian campaign, the French submarines found limited facilities available to them at Harwich and had to rely largely on Jules Verne and spare parts sent from Cherbourg in France for repairs, some of which never were completed. Jules Verne′s crew converted two of Sibylle′s water tanks into diesel fuel tanks in an attempt to increase her operating range and to avoid problems with possible leaks from her external fuel tanks, but this modification proved to be of little help in Sibylle′s operations.

By 6 May 1940 the Allies had indications that a German invasion of the Netherlands was imminent, and that day Horton ordered all available submarines to put to sea. The submarines of the 16th Submarine Division received orders to join four other French, four British, and two Polish Navy submarines in forming a patrol line in the North Sea off the coast of the Netherlands to find and attack German submarines believed to be operating in the area. The Battle of France began when German ground forces advanced into France, the Netherlands, Belgium, and Luxembourg on 10 May 1940. On 17 May 1940, Sibylle collided with the French submarine Circé while submerging. In a friendly fire incident on 20 May 1940, Antiope mistook Sybille for a U-boat and fired three torpedoes at her in the North Sea at 53°23′N 003°44′E at a range of 600 metres (660 yd); the torpedoes passed beneath Sybille.

On 25 May 1940, Jules Verne and the submarines of the 2nd, 13th, and 16th Submarine Divisions arrived in Dundee, Scotland. On 4 June 1940, Jules Verne and all the French submarines assigned to her departed Dundee and proceeded to Brest, France. Italy declared war on France on 10 June 1940 and joined the invasion. As German ground forces approached Brest on 18 June 1940, all French ships received orders at 18:00 to evacuate the port, with those unable to get underway ordered to scuttle themselves. At 18:30, Jules Verne and 13 submarines, including Sibylle, got underway from Brest bound for Casablanca, French Morocco, which they reached on 23 June 1940.

The Battle of France ended in France's defeat and armistices with Germany on 22 June 1940 and with Italy on 24 June. When the armistices both went into effect on 25 June 1940, Sibylle was at Casablanca.

=== Vichy France ===
After France's surrender, Sibylle served in the naval forces of Vichy France. On 11 and 12 September 1940, Sibylle, Antiope, Amazone, and their sister ship Amphitrite covered Force Y, a French Navy force consisting of three cruisers and three destroyers, as it arrived at Casablanca from Toulon, France, refueled, and then resumed its voyage to French West Africa.

On 23 September 1940, British and Free French forces began Operation Menace, an attack on Vichy French forces at Dakar in Senegal. On 24 September 1940, Sibylle, Amazone, Amphitrite, and Antiope received orders to deploy to French West Africa. Each of the submarines departed Casablanca as she became ready for the deployment. Operation Menace ended on 25 September 1940 in the withdrawal of the British and Free French forces from Dakar. In need of a cylinder head change, Sibylle arrived at Dakar on 1 October 1940 to reinforce its defenses.

As of 23 October 1940 Sibylle still was part of the 16th Submarine Division along with Amazone, Antiope, and Orphée, but now based in French Morocco. After arriving at Toulon, she was placed under guard in an unarmed and unfueled status in March 1941 in accordance with the June 1940 armistice.

Subsequently reactivated, Sibylle returned to Africa. As of 1 November 1942 she still was part of the 16th Submarine Division along with Amazone, Amphitrite, Antiope, and the submarine Perle and based at Casablanca. During the night of 7–8 November 1942, the French naval commander at Casablanca received indications that an Allied invasion of French North Africa was imminent and took action to resist it.

=== Loss ===
Operation Torch, the Allied amphibious landings in French Morocco and Algeria, began in the predawn hours of 8 November 1942. As the naval Battle of Casablanca began that morning between United States Navy and Vichy French forces, Sibylle departed Casablanca at 07:04 with orders to patrol in the Atlantic Ocean in Sector 5 off Fedala. She was never heard from again, and was lost with her entire crew of 41.

The circumstances of the loss of Sibylle remain a mystery. It is possible that U.S. aircraft sank her during the Naval Battle of Casablanca, which did not subside until 16 November 1942, although hostilities between Allied and French forces in French North Africa ceased on 11 November 1942. An unidentified submarine reportedly struck a mine in an Allied defensive minefield off Casablanca during the night of 16–17 November 1942 at 33°41′23″N 007°23′23″W, and this report could reflect the sinking of Sibylle if she still was operating off Casablanca that long after hostilities ended. Some sources have credited the German submarine U-173 with sinking Sibylle before U-173 was herself sunk by U.S. Navy destroyers on 16 November 1942, but this seems unlikely. American destroyer USS Bristol reported to have engaged an unidentified submarine with its main guns and with depth charges on 11 November 1942 off Fedala.

== Honors and awards ==
- Croix de Guerre 1939–1945 with palm

After her loss, Sibylle was awarded three citations. The first, on 17 December 1942, acknowledged that she disappeared "gloriously" during Operation Torch. The second, on 8 January 1943, again noted that she disappeared "gloriously" and credited her with conducting operations against Allied forces from 8 through 10 November 1942 and with sinking an Allied troop transport. The third, on 9 July 1943, was a citation à l'ordre de l'armée which awarded her and her crew the Croix de Guerre 1939–1945 with palm.
