= 600 Series submarines =

600 Series Submarine may refer to:

- French 600 Series submarines, a series of submarine classes built for the French Navy between 1923 and 1933
- Italian 600 Series submarines, a series of submarine classes built for the Regia Marina between 1932 and 1941
