= French submarine Doris (Q135) =

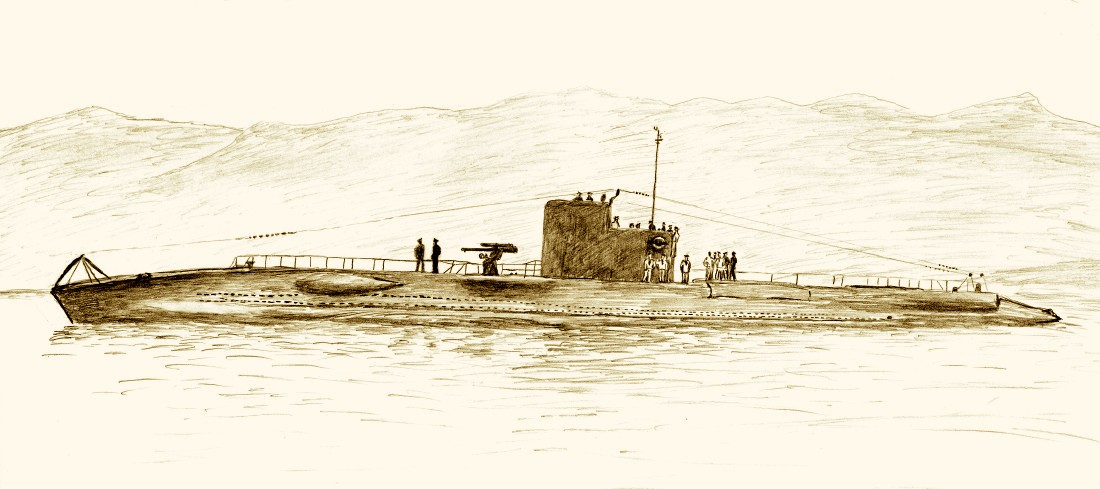

History

France
- Name: Doris
- Namesake: Doris, a sea goddess in Greek mythology
- Builder: Chantiers de la Gironde, Bordeaux, France
- Laid down: 1 February 1924
- Launched: 25 November 1927
- Commissioned: 26 May 1928 or 10 January 1930 (see text)
- Fate: Sunk 8 or 9 May 1940 (see text)

General characteristics
- Class & type: Circé-class coastal submarine
- Displacement: 615 tons normal (surfaced); 776 ton (submerged)
- Length: 62.48 m (204.99 ft)
- Beam: 6.2 m (20.34 ft)
- Draught: 3.99 m (13.09 ft)
- Propulsion: Diesel/electric; 2 shafts; 1,200 bhp (895 kW) diesel (surfaced); 1,000 shp (746 kW) electric (submerged); 60 t diesel oil
- Speed: 14 knots (26 km/h; 16 mph) (surfaced); 7.5 knots (13.9 km/h; 8.6 mph) (submerged)
- Range: 2,000 nmi (3,700 km; 2,300 mi) at 10 knots (19 km/h; 12 mph) (surface); 85 nmi (157 km; 98 mi) at 5 knots (9.3 km/h; 5.8 mph) (submerged)
- Complement: 41
- Armament: 7 × 550 mm (22 in) torpedo tubes; 1 × 75 mm (3 in) deck gun; 2 × 13.2 mm (0.52 in) machine guns

Doris was a Circé-class coastal submarine of the French Navy, in service from 1928 until May 1940, when she was sunk off the Dutch coast by the German coastal submarine U-9. The wreck was rediscovered by Dutch divers in 2003.

== Construction and commissioning ==
Doris was ordered as part of the 1923 naval program. Laid down by Chantiers de la Gironde at Bordeaux, France, on 1 February 1924 with the pennant number Q135, Doris was launched on either 25 or 26 November 1927, according to different sources. Sources disagree on her commissioning date, some claiming that she was commissioned on 26 May 1928 and one that she began her official acceptance tests that day and was not commissioned until 10 January 1930, when she was at Toulon, France.

== Service history ==
When World War II began with Nazi Germany′s invasion of Poland on 1 September 1939, Doris was part of the 13th Submarine Division of the 5th Submarine Squadron in the 1st Flotilla of the 2nd Squadron along with her sister ships Circé, Calypso, and Thétis at Toulon. France entered the war on 3 September 1939.

In 1940, the Allies made plans to intervene in Norway to prevent the shipment of iron ore from Sweden to Germany via Narvik on the Norwegian coast. Twelve French submarines, including the four submarines of the 13th Division, were to participate in the operation as the 10th Submarine Flotilla under the overall command of Royal Navy Vice Admiral Max Horton. Accordingly, Calypso and Thétis got underway from Bizerte, Tunisia, on 23 March 1940 and proceeded to Harwich, England, where the French Navy submarine tender Jules Verne was to support them as they patrolled the Heligoland Bight and the southern North Sea in support of the Norway operation. The Allies′ plans for Norway took on greater urgency on 9 April 1940, when Germany began Operation Weserübung, its invasion of Norway and Denmark. Circé arrived at Harwich on 14 April.

Sources provide differing accounts of Doris′s arrival to join the rest of her division at Harwich. According to one, she set out from Harwich on her first war patrol in the Heligoland Bight on 19 April 1940, while others claim that she did not arrive at Harwich from France until 20 April. Just after beginning her first patrol from Harwich, her port diesel engine seized. Her crew could not repair the engine at sea, and the loss of the engine made it impossible to operate the main air compressor that supplied compressed air to her ballast tanks, preventing her from surfacing again if she dived. She limped back to Harwich on one engine, but the technicians aboard Jules Verne also could not repair the engine. The French submarines had found limited facilities available to them at Harwich and had to rely largely on Jules Verne and spare parts sent from Cherbourg in France for repairs, some of which never were completed. In Doris′s case, repairs were not even possible in France, as no spare parts for her German-made engine were available in France.

Despite having only one functioning diesel engine — cutting her maximum surface speed in half — and no ability to resurface after diving, Doris received orders on 6 May 1940 to prepare to sortie for a patrol in the North Sea off the coast of the Netherlands north of the Frisian Islands in anticipation of a possible German invasion of the Netherlands. Her commanding officer, Capitaine de corvette Jean Favreul, gathered the crew that day and informed them that the patrol was important enough for them to attempt to carry it out, but told them that he did not expect Doris to survive it. They all nonetheless agreed to conduct the patrol, many of them writing farewell letters to their relatives that night. At 15:20 on 7 May 1940, Doris got underway in company with the French submarine Amazone and the British submarine HMS Shark to join ten other submarines — four French, four British, and two Polish — off the coast of the Netherlands in an area where the Allies believed that German submarines were operating. With numerous neutral vessels operating in the vicinity, and given the proximity of the Royal Netherlands Navy base at Den Helder in the still-neutral Netherlands, the Allied submarines had orders from Horton not to attack any vessel without firmly establishing its identity as enemy.

=== Loss ===
During the night of 8–9 May 1940, the German submarine U-9, under the command of Oberleutnant zur See Wolfgang Lüth, sighted what Lüth identified as a 1,000-ton submarine on the surface 30 nautical miles (56 km; 35 mi) from Den Helder at a range of 1 to 2 nautical miles (1.9 to 3.7 km; 1.2 to 2.3 mi). Lüth′s approach to an attack position was spoiled temporarily when the submarine changed course, but he eventually reached a firing position and fired two G7a torpedoes at the submarine at a range of 800 to 900 metres (870 to 980 yd). Fifty-two seconds later, U-9′s crew heard a loud explosion and observed a fireball that reached 100 metres (328 ft) in height. The submarine disappeared within a minute of the explosion. U-9 subsequently searched the area and found nothing but an oil slick. On 9 May 1940, a German communique announced Lüth′s sinking of an Allied submarine in the North Sea. Lüth reported that the submarine sank at 53°40′N 003°49′E.

Doris was expected to return to Harwich at 15:00 on 13 May 1940 but did not respond to messages asking her to confirm her expected time of arrival. On 15 May 1940, Horton announced that Doris presumably had been sunk by a German submarine with the loss of all 45 men on board — her entire 42-man crew and three Royal Navy liaison personnel. However, the possibility that Doris had been sunk by a mine was kept open until after the conclusion of World War II, when a postwar examination of German records confirmed that U-9 had sunk Doris.

Lüth claimed to have sighted Doris at 23:50 on 8 May and that his torpedoes hit her at 00:14 on 9 May, and many sources place the sinking of Doris on 9 May. However, the crew of Amazone, operating on the surface 10 nautical miles (19 km; 12 mi) away, observed and heard three explosions in the direction of Doris′s patrol area at 23:18 French time on 8 May 1940, and 8 May is the likely date of Doris′s loss.

== Discovery of wreck ==
In 2003, Dutch divers Hans van Leeuwen and Ton van der Sluijs put to sea to investigate an obstruction on the seabed in the North Sea. After anchoring their sloop to it, they began their dive and quickly identified the obstruction as the wreck of a submarine at a depth of 36 metres (118 ft). They measured its length at 65 metres (213 ft), only slightly longer than Doris′s actual length. Over the course of a number of dives, they surveyed the wreck, finding Doris′s hull missing from a point 7 metres (23 ft) aft of her conning tower. Her deck gun lay on the seabed 2 metres (6 ft 7 in) forward of her conning tower and to port of her hull. Her two external torpedo launchers were to starboard, one 3 metres (9.8 ft) from the hull and the other 7 metres (23 ft) from the bow. A deck winch that had been mounted above the engine room was on the seabed just forward of the bow, and a great deal of small debris was strewn around the wreck. Van Leeuwen and van der Sluijs recovered a number of objects from the debris field, including a copper plate with French wording on it and a 70-kilogram (154 lb) air valve housing marked with the name "Doris."

About two months after their first dive on the wreck, the men reported it to French authorities. Over a five-day period in November 2003, the French Navy minehunter Cassiopée determined the wreck's exact position as 52°47.36′N 3°49.16′E and used sonar to discover that the apparently missing after section of the hull is buried under 2 metres (6 ft 7 in) of sand. In a 15-hour operation complicated by the presence of a great number of buried fishing nets and lines in the vicinity, Cassiopée also recovered Doris′s deck gun from the sea floor to assist in confirming the wreck's identity. The wreck was formally identified as that of Doris on 3 December 2003.

== Commemoration ==
- On 16 July 2004, a memorial ceremony took place at sea above the wreck aboard the French Navy patrol boat Pluvier, accompanied by the Royal Netherlands Navy submarine HNLMS Dolfijn. Van Leeuwen and van der Sluijs and representatives of the French, Royal, and Royal Netherlands navies attended aboard Pluvier.
- On 27 November 2004, a memorial ceremony took place at the submarine base at Brest, France, in the presence of the families of the lost crewmen, with van Leeuwen and van der Sluijs again in attendance.
- Doris′s deck gun is on display at Brest as a memorial.
- A commemorative plaque is on display in the church of Berlancourt, France, in memory of Georges Rebouté, an enlisted member of Doris′s crew lost in the sinking.
