= Circé-class submarine (1925) =

Submarine class

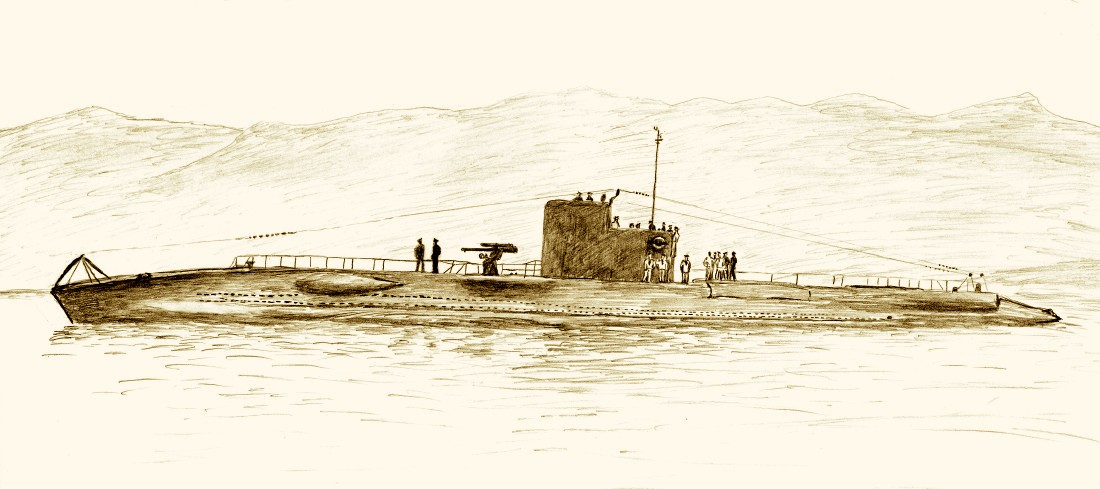
- Doris

Class overview
- Name: Circé class
- Operators: French Navy
- Built: 1925–1927
- In commission: 1927–1940
- Completed: 4
- Lost: 4

General characteristics
- Type: Submarine
- Displacement: 615 tonnes (605 long tons) surfaced; 776 tonnes (764 long tons) submerged
- Length: 64 m (210 ft)
- Propulsion: 2 × diesel engines, 1,200 bhp (895 kW); 2 × electric motors, 1,000 shp (746 kW); 2 shafts
- Speed: 14 knots (26 km/h; 16 mph) surfaced; 7.5 knots (13.9 km/h; 8.6 mph) submerged
- Range: 3,500 mi (5,600 km) at 7.5 kn (13.9 km/h; 8.6 mph)
- Complement: 41
- Armament: 7 × 550 mm (22 in) torpedo tubes; 1 × 75 mm (3 in) deck gun; 2 × 8 mm (0.31 in) machine guns

The Circé-class submarines were a sub-class of the 600 Series of submarines built for the French Navy prior to World War II. There were four vessels in the class, built to a Schneider-Laubeuf design. They were ordered in 1925 and completed by 1927.

The four boats of the Circé class saw action during the Second World War, from September 1939 until the French armistice in June 1940.

== General characteristics ==
The Circé class had a displacement of 615 tons surfaced and 776 tons submerged. They had an endurance of 3,500 miles at 7.5 knots (13.9 km/h; 8.6 mph), with a maximum surface speed of 14 knots (26 km/h; 16 mph), and a submerged speed of 7.5 knots (13.9 km/h; 8.6 mph). Their armament was seven torpedo tubes (three forward, two midships, and two aft) with an outfit of 13 torpedoes. As with all French submarines of this period, the midships torpedo tubes were fitted externally in trainable mounts. They had a single 75 mm (3 in) deck gun and two 8 mm (0.31 in) machine guns, and were manned by crews of 41 men.

== Ships ==
- Circé was at Bizerte in June 1940. She was seized in 1942 and became the Italian FR117. She was scuttled in 1943.
- Calypso was at Bizerte in June 1940. She was seized in 1942, but wrecked by Allied bombing in 1943.
- Thétis was at Toulon in June 1940. She was scuttled there in November 1942.
- Doris was sunk in the North Sea in May 1940 by the German submarine U-9.

== See also ==
- List of submarines of France
- French submarines of World War II
