= French ship Siroco =

At least four ships of the French Navy have borne the name Siroco:

- French torpedo boat Siroco was a Cyclone-class torpedo boat launched in 1901 and struck in 1925.
- French destroyer Siroco (1925) was a Bourrasque-class destroyer launched in 1925 and sunk in 1940
- French destroyer Siroco (1941) was a Le Hardi-class destroyer launched in 1939 as Le Corsaire and renamed Siroco in 1941. She was scuttled in 1942
- French ship Siroco (L9012) was a Foudre-class landing platform dock launched in 1996. She was sold to Brazil in 2015 and renamed Bahia
