= German submarine U-9 (1935) =

German World War II submarine

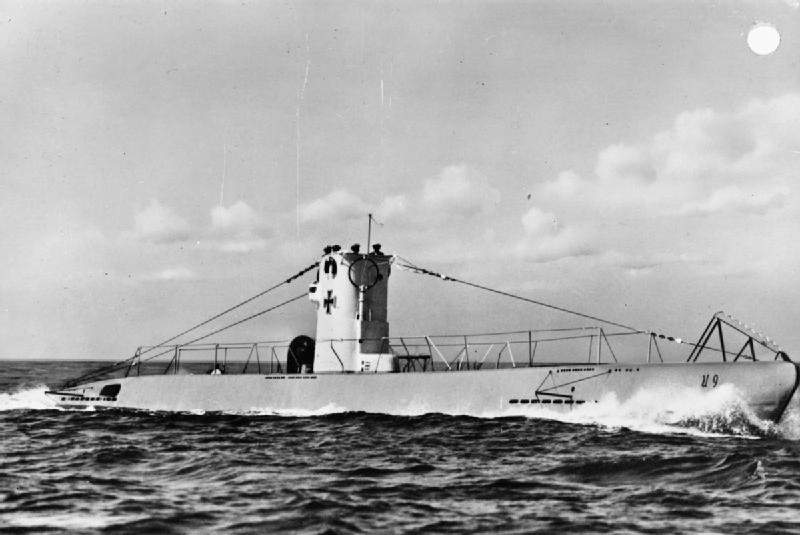
- U-9 in 1936, note the submarine's number on the hull which was painted out in wartime

History

Nazi Germany
- Name: U-9
- Ordered: 20 July 1934
- Builder: Germaniawerft, Kiel; Galați shipyard, Romania
- Yard number: 543
- Laid down: 8 April 1935
- Launched: 30 July 1935
- Commissioned: 21 August 1935
- Fate: Sunk 20 August 1944 at Constanța, Romania, in a Soviet air raid

Soviet Union
- Name: TS-16
- Acquired: 1945
- Fate: Broken up on 12 December 1946

General characteristics
- Class & type: Type IIB coastal submarine
- Displacement: 279 t (275 long tons) surfaced; 328 t (323 long tons) submerged
- Length: 42.70 m (140 ft 1 in) o/a; 27.80 m (91 ft 2 in) pressure hull
- Beam: 4.08 m (13 ft 5 in) (o/a); 4.00 m (13 ft 1 in) (pressure hull)
- Height: 8.60 m (28 ft 3 in)
- Draught: 3.90 m (12 ft 10 in)
- Installed power: 700 PS (510 kW; 690 bhp) (diesels); 410 PS (300 kW; 400 shp) (electric)
- Propulsion: 2 shafts; 2 × diesel engines; 2 × electric motors
- Speed: 13 knots (24 km/h; 15 mph) surfaced; 7 knots (13 km/h; 8.1 mph) submerged
- Range: 1,800 nmi (3,300 km; 2,100 mi) at 12 knots (22 km/h; 14 mph) surfaced; 35–43 nmi (65–80 km; 40–49 mi) at 4 knots (7.4 km/h; 4.6 mph) submerged
- Test depth: 80 m (260 ft)
- Complement: 3 officers, 22 men
- Armament: 3 × 53.3 cm (21 in) torpedo tubes; 5 × torpedoes or up to 12 TMA or 18 TMB mines; 1 × 2 cm (0.79 in) anti-aircraft gun

Service record
- Part of: 1st U-boat Flotilla; 1 September 1935 – 1 August 1939; 1 October 1939 – 30 June 1940; 24th U-boat Flotilla; 1 July – 31 October 1940; 21st U-boat Flotilla; 1 November 1940 – 18 April 1942; 30th U-boat Flotilla; 28 October 1942 – 20 August 1944
- Identification codes: M 13 068
- Commanders: Oblt.z.S. / Kptlt. Hans-Günther Looff; 21 August 1935 – 1936/37; Kptlt. Werner von Schmidt; 30 September 1935 – 1 October 1937; Kptlt. Ludwig Mathes; 1 October 1937 – 18 September 1939; Oblt.z.S. Max-Martin Schulte; 19 September – 29 December 1939; Oblt.z.S. Wolfgang Lüth; 30 December 1939 – 10 June 1940; Oblt.z.S. Wolfgang Kaufmann; 11 June – 20 October 1940; Oblt.z.S. / Kptlt. Joachim Deecke; 21 October 1940 – 8 June 1941; Oblt.z.S. / Kptlt. Hans-Joachim Schmidt-Weichert; 2 July 1941 – 18 April 1942; 28 October 1942 – 15 September 1943; Oblt.z.S. Heinrich Klapdor; 16 September 1943 – 31 March 1944; Oblt.z.S.d.R Martin Landt-Hayen; 5 – 6 April 1944; Kptlt. Klaus Petersen; 7 April – June 1944; Oblt.z.S. Heinrich Klapdor; June 1944 – 20 August 1944
- Operations: 19 patrols: 1st patrol: 25 August 1939 – 15 September 1939; 2nd patrol: 16 – 22 January 1940; 3rd patrol: a. 5 – 14 February 1940; b. 17 February 1940; 4th patrol: 14 – 20 March 1940; 5th patrol: 4 – 24 April 1940; 6th patrol: 5 – 15 May 1940; 7th patrol: 16 – 30 May 1940; 8th patrol: 11 November – 1 December 1942; 9th patrol: 19 December 1942 – 7 January 1943; 10th patrol: 3 February – 3 March 1943; 11th patrol: 17 April – 10 May 1943; 12th patrol: 20 May – 12 June 1943; 13th patrol: a. 26 August – 6 September 1943; b. 9 – 10 September 1943; 14th patrol: a. 2 – 23 October 1943; b. 24 October – 6 November 1943; 15th patrol: 28 November – 25 December 1943; 16th patrol: a. 21 – 25 February 1944; b. 26 – 28 February 1944; 17th patrol: a. 23 – 31 March 1944; b. 5 – 6 April 1944; 18th patrol: 26 April – 28 May 1944; 19th patrol: 15 July – 11 August 1944
- Victories: 7 merchant ships sunk (16,669 GRT); 1 warship sunk (552 tons); 1 warship damaged (412 tons)

German submarine U-9 was a Type IIB U-boat of Nazi Germany's Kriegsmarine. Her keel was laid down on 8 February 1935, by Germaniawerft in Kiel as yard number 543. She was launched on 30 July 1935 and commissioned on 21 August, with Korvettenkapitän Hans-Günther Looff in command.

U-9 conducted 19 patrols under a series of commanders, including U-boat ace Wolfgang Lüth, sinking eight ships totalling 17,221 gross register tons (GRT) and damaging another displacing 412 tons. This included the French Sirène class coastal submarine Doris.

She was sunk by Soviet bombs on 20 August 1944. Her wreck was later raised by the Soviets, repaired and recommissioned as TS-16 but was broken up in December 1946 because of her poor performance.

== Design ==
German Type IIB submarines were enlarged versions of the original Type IIs. U-9 had a displacement of 279 tonnes (275 long tons) when at the surface and 328 tonnes (323 long tons) while submerged. Officially, the standard tonnage was 250 long tons (254 t), however. The U-boat had a total length of 42.70 m (140 ft 1 in), a pressure hull length of 28.20 m (92 ft 6 in), a beam of 4.08 m (13 ft 5 in), a height of 8.60 m (28 ft 3 in), and a draught of 3.90 m (12 ft 10 in). The submarine was powered by two MWM RS 127 S four-stroke, six-cylinder diesel engines of 700 metric horsepower (510 kW; 690 shp) for cruising, two Siemens-Schuckert PG VV 322/36 double-acting electric motors producing a total of 460 metric horsepower (340 kW; 450 shp) for use while submerged. She had two shafts and two 0.85 m (3 ft) propellers. The boat was capable of operating at depths of up to 80–150 metres (260–490 ft).

The submarine had a maximum surface speed of 12 knots (22 km/h; 14 mph) and a maximum submerged speed of 7 knots (13 km/h; 8.1 mph). When submerged, the boat could operate for 35–42 nautical miles (65–78 km; 40–48 mi) at 4 knots (7.4 km/h; 4.6 mph); when surfaced, she could travel 3,800 nautical miles (7,000 km; 4,400 mi) at 8 knots (15 km/h; 9.2 mph). U-9 was fitted with three 53.3 cm (21 in) torpedo tubes at the bow, five torpedoes or up to twelve Type A torpedo mines, and a 2 cm (0.79 in) anti-aircraft gun. The boat had a complement of twenty.

== Service history ==
U-9 was ordered on 20 July 1934, i.e. in violation of the Versailles Treaty, which denied Germany possession of submarines. The U-boat was not laid down until 11 March 1935, and launched on 29 June 1935, within weeks of the Anglo-German Naval Agreement, which granted Germany parity with the British Empire in submarines. On 27 December 1942, at 16:20, off Sochi in the Black Sea, a Soviet minesweeper dropped eight depth charges on the boat, causing minor damage. On 31 Mar 1944 U-9 was lying in Feodosia to refuel when the harbor was attacked by 18 Il-2 ground attack aircraft. The boat was damaged by strafing and a bomb hit made a dent in the pressure hull on port side aft, also wounding the commander, who operated the 20mm AA gun himself, with splinters. The gunners claimed hits on two aircraft that were seen to crash. Eleven days later, again in the Black Sea, south of Yalta, depth charges from a Soviet escort caused minor damage.

== Fate ==
To serve in the 30th U-boat Flotilla, the submarine was transported in sections along the Danube to the Romanian port of Galați. She was then re-assembled by the Romanians at the Galați shipyard and sent to the Black Sea. At 10:30 on 20 August 1944, at Constanţa in Romania in position 44°12′N 28°41′E, U-9 was sunk by bombs from Soviet aircraft. The Soviets raised the boat and brought her into Mykolaiv in 1945. She was repaired and commissioned into the Soviet Navy as TS-16, but was struck from the Soviet Navy due to the impossibility of restoration and later broken up. U-9's Iron Cross is on display at the Black Sea Fleet Museum.

== Summary of raiding history ==
Date	Name	Nationality	Tonnage (Note: Merchant ship tonnages are in gross register tons. Military vessels are listed by tons displacement.)	Fate
18 January 1940	Flandria	Sweden	1,179	Sunk
19 January 1940	Patria	Sweden	1,188	Sunk
11 February 1940	Linda	Estonia	1,213	Sunk
4 May 1940	San Tiburcio	United Kingdom	5,995	Sunk (mine)
9 May 1940	Doris	French Navy	552	Sunk
11 May 1940	Tringa	United Kingdom	1,930	Sunk
11 May 1940	Viiu	Estonia	1,908	Sunk
23 May 1940	Sigurd Faulbaum	Belgium	3,256	Sunk
11 May 1944	Shtorm	Soviet Navy	412	Damaged

== Bibliography ==
- Busch, Rainer; Röll, Hans-Joachim (1999). German U-boat commanders of World War II : a biographical dictionary. Translated by Brooks, Geoffrey. London, Annapolis, Md: Greenhill Books, Naval Institute Press. ISBN 1-55750-186-6.
- Gröner, Eric; Jung, Dieter; Maass, Martin (1991). German Warships 1815-1945: U-boats and Mine Warfare Vessels. Vol. 2. Translated by Thomas, Keith; Magowan, Rachel. London: Conway Maritime Press. ISBN 0-85177-593-4.
- Neistlé, Axel (2014). German U-Boat Losses during World War II: Details of Destruction (2 ed.). Havertown: Frontline Books (published 30 June 2014).
- Sharpe, Peter (1998). U-Boat Fact File. Great Britain: Midland Publishing. ISBN 1-85780-072-9.
