= M-class minesweeper (Netherlands) =

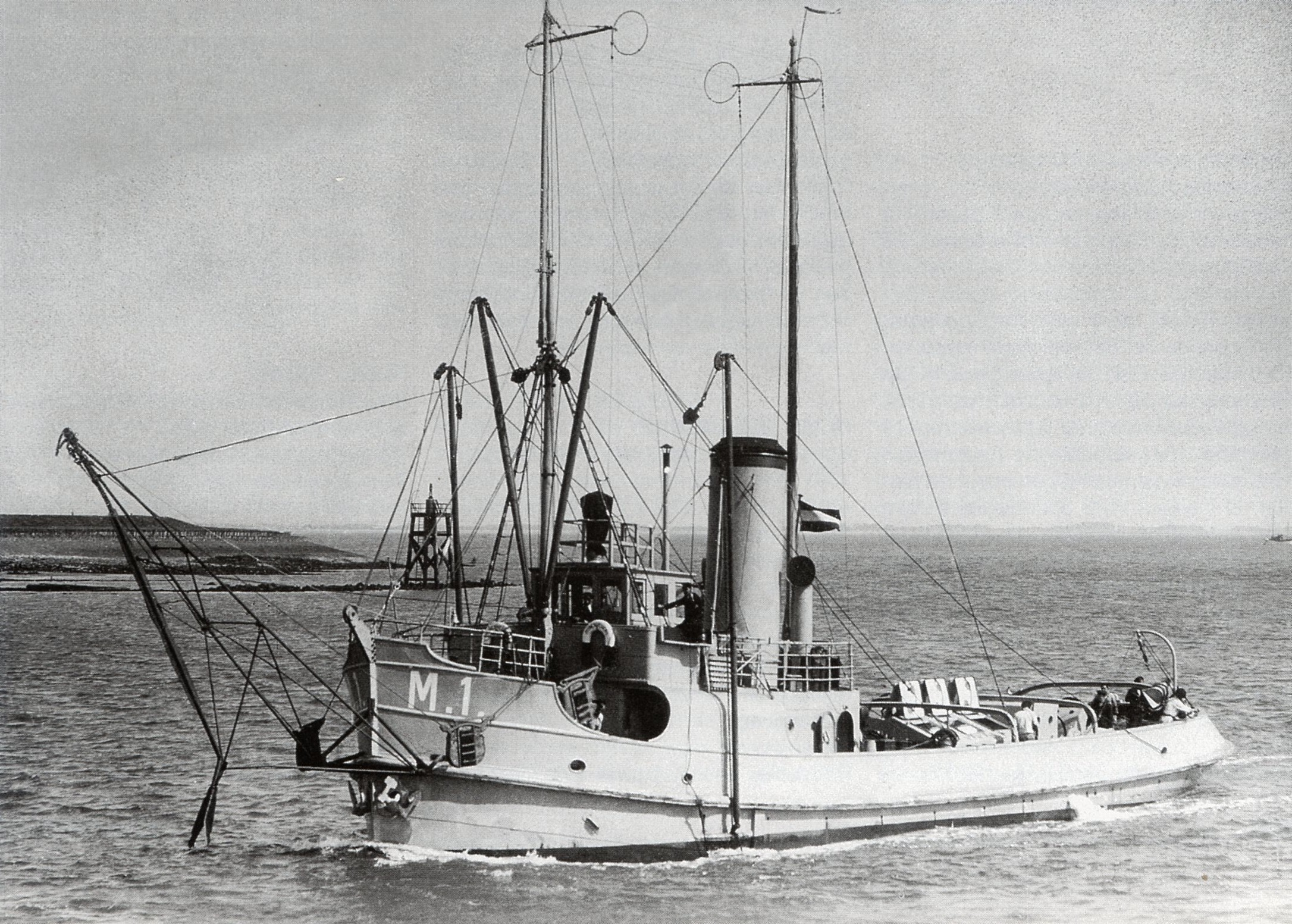
- HNLMS M 1

Class overview
- Builders: Van der Kuyk & van der Ree; Fa. Koopman; J & A van der Schuyt
- Operators: Royal Netherlands Navy; Kriegsmarine
- Succeeded by: A-class
- In commission: 1918-1992
- Completed: 4
- Lost: 1

General characteristics
- Type: Minesweeper
- Displacement: M1: 328 t (323 long tons); M2: 205 t (202 long tons); M3 & M4: 230 t (226 long tons)
- Length: 30 m (98 ft 5 in) (approx.)
- Propulsion: M1 & M2: 500 hp (373 kW) engine; M3 & M4: 450 hp (336 kW) engine
- Speed: M1: 9.5 knots (17.6 km/h; 10.9 mph); M2, M3 & M4: 10 knots (19 km/h; 12 mph)
- Complement: 16
- Armament: 2 x 12.7 mm machine guns

The M class were the first minesweepers of the Royal Netherlands Navy. The need for minesweepers for the Dutch marine came during the First World War when sea mines were laid in great numbers.

== Design and construction ==
The Navy converted four tugboats into minesweepers. These ships had been built by three different shipyards; Van der Kuyk & van der Ree in Rotterdam, Fa. Koopman in Dordrecht, and J & A van der Schuyt in Papendrecht.

== Service history ==
All M class minesweepers were still in service during the Second World War, but none of them was able to escape to the United Kingdom; three of the four ships fell in German hands (M 3 was scuttled). After the war M 1 and M 4 were returned to the Netherlands, and re-entered service as tugboats.

== Ships in class ==
M-class construction data
Ship	Builder	Commissioned	Decommissioned	Fate
M 1	Van der Kuyk & van der Ree	31 October 1918	1949	Sunk at Norderney during a storm
M 2	Koopman	31 October 1918	1940	Sunk at IJmuiden during a storm
M 3	J & A van der Schuyt	1 October 1918	1940	Scuttled at IJmuiden as blockship
M 4	J & A van der Schuyt	1 October 1918	1992	In 1994 turned into a restaurant in Zwolle

== See also ==
- List of minesweepers of the Royal Netherlands Navy
