= Bratland =

Bratland is a surname. Notable people with the surname include:

- Brita Bratland (1910–1975), Norwegian folk singer
- Erlend Bratland (born 1991), Norwegian singer
- Geir Bratland (born 1970), Norwegian keyboardist
- Ingebjørg Bratland (born 1990), Norwegian folk singer, kveder and artist
- Per Bratland (1907–1988), Norwegian newspaper editor
- Sondre Bratland (born 1938), Norwegian folk singer, song teacher and Government scholar
- Sverre Bratland (1917–2002), Norwegian military leader
