= HMS Cambrian (1939) =

WWII-era Royal Navy ship

History

United Kingdom
- Name: 1924-35: Lord Derby; 1935-1939: Ocean Knight; 1939: Stella Procyon; 1939-40: Cambrian
- Builder: Cochrane and Sons, Selby, Yorkshire
- Launched: 21 May 1924
- Acquired: September 1939
- Commissioned: September 1939
- Fate: Sank after striking a mine, 30 May 1940

General characteristics
- Type: Boom defence vessel
- Tonnage: 338 GRT
- Length: 138 feet 4 inches (42.16 m)
- Beam: 23 feet 7.5 inches (7.201 m)
- Depth: 13 feet 4 inches (4.06 m)
- Propulsion: 3-cylinder triple expansion steam engine and single screw

HMS Cambrian was a boom defence vessel of the Royal Navy in the Second World War. She was built by Cochrane and Sons of Selby, Yorkshire in 1924 as the fishing trawler Lord Derby. She operated on the Yorkshire coast fishery and was renamed Ocean Knight in 1935 and Stella Procyon in 1939. Shortly after the outbreak of the Second World War she was requisitioned by the Admiralty and commissioned into the Royal Navy as HMS Cambrian. Cambrian served on the defence booms around Portsmouth and was sunk there on 30 May 1940 after striking a naval mine, with the loss of 23 of her crew. Parts of the wreck remain in the Solent and are marked by a buoy.

== Civilian service ==
Lord Derby was built as a steam-powered trawler by Cochrane and Sons of Selby, Yorkshire, and launched on 21 May 1924. She had a gross register tonnage of 338 and a net register tonnage of 137. Lord Derby measured 138 feet 4 inches (42.16 m) in length on deck, 23 feet 7.5 inches (7.201 m) in breadth and 13 feet 4 inches (4.06 m) in depth. She had a single boiler, a 3-cylinder triple expansion steam engine and was propelled by a single screw. Lord Derby was originally owned and operated by the Pickering & Haldane Steam Trawling Company on the Yorkshire coast fishery, out of the port of Kingston upon Hull. In 1935 the vessel was renamed Ocean Knight and, in 1939 was renamed as Stella Procyon.

== Royal Navy service ==
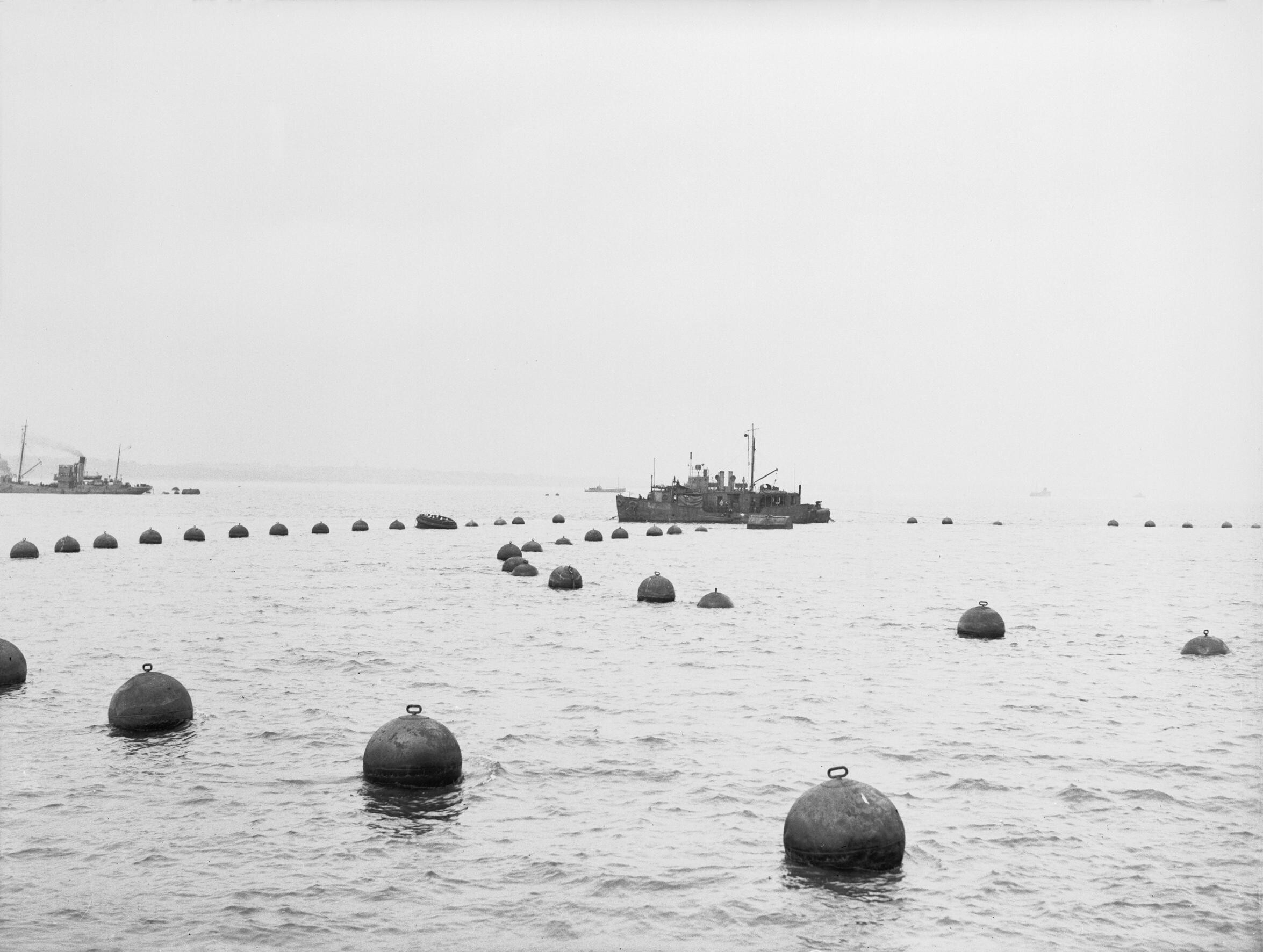
One of the Portsmouth defence booms during the war, with a gate manned by boom defence vessel Rogate

The Stella Procyon was requisitioned by the Admiralty in September 1939, shortly after the start of the Second World War and commissioned as HMS Cambrian. She was put into service as a boom defence vessel, manning the booms that protected the Royal Navy base at Portsmouth. On 30 May 1940 she was on duty at the boom across the Solent near Horse Sand Fort when she struck a mine and sank. Cambrian lost 23 of her crew in the sinking, the bodies of seven of whom were recovered and buried at the Commonwealth War Graves Commission cemetery at Haslar. Nine of the missing crew are named on the Portsmouth Naval Memorial and the remaining seven on the Chatham Naval Memorial for sailors with no known grave.

== Wreck ==
Cambrian was considered too badly damaged to salvage and was left on the sea bed. In September 1940 her wreck was noted to protrude around 8 feet (2.4 m) above low water level at a position 0.84 nautical miles (1.56 km; 0.97 mi) 130 degrees (approx south-east) from Horse Sand Fort. By 1950 her wreck was in three sections, the largest portion visible at low tide and the other sections submerged by 2–3 feet (0.61–0.91 m) of water, the location of the wreck had been marked by a buoy as a shipping hazard. The wreck was almost completely submerged by 1968, having started to break up. Later that year a private individual requested to purchase the wreck from the navy.

In 1976 the wreck was found to be more extensive than previously thought and lay within 0.9 metres (2 ft 11 in) of the surface at low tide. A survey found it lay in four pieces: the bow portion was 82 feet (25 m) long; the stern, which included the rudder and screw, was 48 feet (15 m) long; her mast had separated from the wreck and was 40 feet (12 m) long and her 15 feet (4.6 m) long boiler lay separately nearby. The wreck had moved over the preceding four years, presumed as a result of nearby dredging of material to construct the M27 motorway, and the highest point of her bow lay just 0.1 metres (3.9 in) below low water level. The wreck marker buoy was relocated to the new site and the decision taken to remove or reduce the wreck to avoid danger to shipping.

Demolition by explosives was in progress by 1978 and by the following year she had been reduced in height to 0.8 metres (2 ft 7 in) below low sea level. The wreck continued to move and break up and in 1986 was within 0.2 metres (7.9 in) of low sea level and was found to be in two main sections, the largest of which measured 30 metres (98 ft) in length. The wreck is now little more than a pile of plates and ribs and scatter debris. A binnacle and decklight have been recovered from the wreckage.

The wreck of Cambrian currently lies at 50°44′30.45″N 001°03′23.88″W in around 5 metres (16 ft) depth of water and is marked by a buoy. The wreck buoy is one of the marks of the limit of jurisdiction of Portsmouth International Port as competent harbour authority.
