= French submarine tender Jules Verne =

Submarine tender of the French Navy

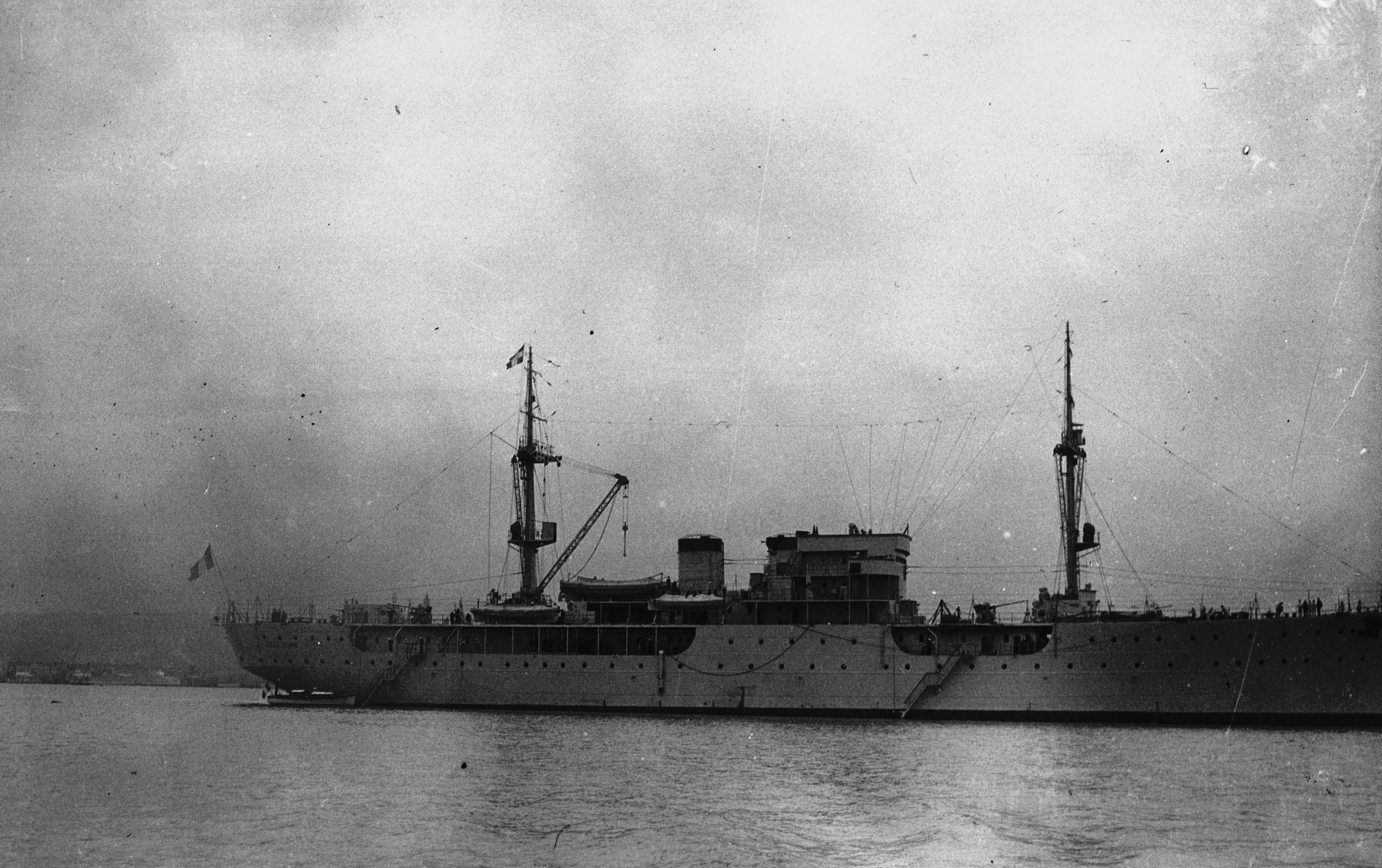
- Jules Verne at Cherbourg, France, ca. 6 July 1932.

History

France
- Name: Jules Verne
- Namesake: Jules Verne (1828–1905), French novelist, poet, and playwright, author of Twenty Thousand Leagues Under the Seas
- Builder: Lorient Arsenal, Lorient, France
- Laid down: 3 June 1929
- Launched: 3 February 1931
- Commissioned: 26 September 1932
- Decommissioned: 1959
- Identification: Pennant number A640
- Fate: Condemned 1 August 1961; Scrapped 1962
- Notes: Converted to repair ship August 1945; In reserve after 1 December 1955

General characteristics
- Class & type: Unique submarine tender
- Displacement: 4,350 tons; 6,340 tons full load
- Length: 122 m (400 ft 3 in)
- Beam: 17.2 m (56 ft 5 in)
- Draught: 6.75 m (22 ft 2 in)
- Propulsion: Two Sulzer diesel engines, 7,000 horsepower (5,220 kW), two shafts
- Speed: 16 knots (30 km/h; 18 mph); 17.2 knots (31.9 km/h; 19.8 mph) (trials)
- Range: 18,500 nmi (34,300 km; 21,300 mi) at 11 knots (20 km/h; 13 mph)
- Complement: 186, 286, or 292 (according to different sources)
- Armament: As built: 4 x 90 mm (3.5 in) Modèle 1926 guns; 4 x 37 mm Modèle 1925 guns; 9 x 8 mm machine guns; In 1944: 4 x 90 mm (3.5 in) Modèle 1926 guns; 7 x Bofors 40 mm guns; 7, 11, or 12 x Oerlilon 20 mm guns (according to different sources)

Jules Verne (A640) was a submarine tender of the French Navy commissioned in 1932. She saw service during World War II, first on the side of the Allies from 1939 to 1940, then in the forces of Vichy France until late in 1942, when she rejoined the Allies as a unit of the Free French Naval Forces. She operated in the North Sea early in the war, then in African waters. After World War II, she operated in French Indochina as a repair ship during the First Indochina War. She was retired in 1959.

== Construction and commissioning ==
Jules Verne was authorized by the naval law of 4 August 1926, and her keel was laid down by the Lorient Arsenal at Lorient, France, on 3 June 1929. Launched on 3 February 1931, she was armed for trials on 23 February 1931 and commissioned on 26 September 1932 with the pennant number A640. She was designed and equipped to support a flotilla of six submarines.

== Service history ==
=== French Navy ===
==== Pre-World War II ====
Based at Brest, France, Jules Verne operated in the Atlantic Ocean, English Channel, and North Sea. On 18 January 1934, she assisted the French cargo ship SS Saint Prosper, which had struck a rock in Alderney Race off Cap de la Hague on the Cotentin Peninsula. On 10 July 1935, she was the flagship of the 2nd Submarine Flotilla.

==== World War II ====
World War II began on 1 September 1939 with the German invasion of Poland, and France entered the war on the side of the Allies on 3 September 1939. Jules Verne was based at Oran in Algeria at the time, and later moved to Casablanca in French Morocco to support submarines based there. Later still, she returned to Brest.

In 1940 the Allies made plans to intervene in Norway to prevent the shipment of iron ore from Sweden to Germany via Narvik on the Norwegian coast. Twelve French submarines were to participate in the operation, supported by Jules Verne, under the overall command of Royal Navy Vice Admiral Max Horton. Accordingly, Jules Verne and the 16th Submarine Division got underway and proceeded to Harwich, England, where they arrived on 22 March 1940. At Harwich, Jules Verne and the submarines formed the 10th Flotilla under Horton's command. The French submarines patrolled in the North Sea off the coast of the Netherlands until 7 April 1940 without success.

On 8 April 1940 German U-boats began operations in accordance with Operationsbefehl Hartmut ("Operation Order Hartmut") in support of Operation Weserübung, the German invasion of Norway and Denmark. Allied operations related to Norway became of greater urgency when the German invasion of both countries began on 9 April 1940. During the Norwegian campaign, the French submarines found limited facilities available to them at Harwich and had to rely largely on Jules Verne and spare parts sent from Cherbourg in France for repairs, some of which never were completed even though Jules Verne′s crews worked 14-hour days. Among other work, Jules Verne′s crew converted two of the water tanks aboard each of the submarines Antiope and Sibylle into diesel fuel tanks in an attempt to increase their operating range and to avoid problems with possible leaks from their external fuel tanks, but this modification proved to be of little help in either submarine's operations.

By 6 May 1940 the Allies had indications that a German invasion of the Netherlands was imminent, and that day Horton ordered all available submarines to put to sea, and French submarines received orders to join British and Polish Navy submarines in forming a patrol line in the North Sea off the coast of the Netherlands to find and attack German submarines believed to be operating in the area. The Battle of France began when German ground forces advanced into France, the Netherlands, Belgium, and Luxembourg on 10 May 1940. On 25 May 1940, Jules Verne and the submarines of the 2nd, 13th, and 16th Submarine Divisions arrived in Dundee, Scotland. On 4 June 1940 Jules Verne and all the French submarines assigned to her departed Dundee and proceeded to Brest. Italy declared war on France on 10 June 1940 and joined the invasion. As German ground forces approached Brest on 18 June 1940, all French ships received orders at 18:00 to evacuate the port, with those unable to get underway ordered to scuttle themselves. At 18:30, Jules Verne and 13 submarines got underway from Brest bound for Casablanca, which they reached on 23 June 1940.

The Battle of France ended in France's defeat and armistices with Germany on 22 June 1940 and with Italy on 24 June. When both armistices went into effect on 25 June 1940, Jules Verne was at Casablanca.

=== Vichy France ===
After the surrender of France, Jules Verne served in the naval forces of Vichy France. She supported French submarines at Casablanca, then in November 1940 was placed under guard in an unarmed and unfueled state at Bizerte, Tunisia, in accordance with the terms of the June 1940 armistices. She underwent a refit at Bizerte, then was reactivated and got underway for Dakar in Senegal in French West Africa under escort by the submarine La Psyché. The two vessels reached Dakar on 23 March 1941, and from then until December 1942 Jules Verne was stationed at Dakar to support French submarine operations there. During her stay in Dakar, Allied forces invaded French North Africa in Operation Torch on 8 November 1942, and after hostilities between Allied and Vichy French forces in French North Africa ceased on 11 November 1942, French forces in Africa switched to the Allied side to fight in the forces of Free France.

=== Free France ===
As a unit of the Free French Naval Forces, Jules Verne completed her assignment at Dakar in December 1942, then served at Port Étienne in Mauritania from January to September 1943. By December 1943 she was back at Dakar, then she moved to Algiers in Algeria, where she operated until September 1944. In August 1945, the month in which World War II ended with the surrender of Japan, she was converted into a repair ship for duty in French Indochina.

=== Later service ===
Jules Verne served in French Indochina from March 1946 to July 1955, supporting French amphibious warfare forces fighting in the First Indochina War as a repair ship and also operating as a transport. She underwent two refits during her service in French Indochina, one at the beginning of 1948 at Toulon, France, and one in late 1952 and early 1953 at Uraga, Japan.

Concluding her service in French Indochina, Jules Verne returned to Toulon on 23 August 1955. Placed in reserve on 1 December 1955, she served at Saint-Mandrier-sur-Mer, France, as a barracks ship for the amphibious corps.

== Disposal ==
Jules Verne was retired from active service in 1959. She was condemned on 1 August 1961 and scrapped in 1962 at La Seyne-sur-Mer, France.
