= USS West Lianga =

Cargo ship for the United States Navy

Coordinates: 55°18′N 40°0′W

USS West Lianga (ID-2758)
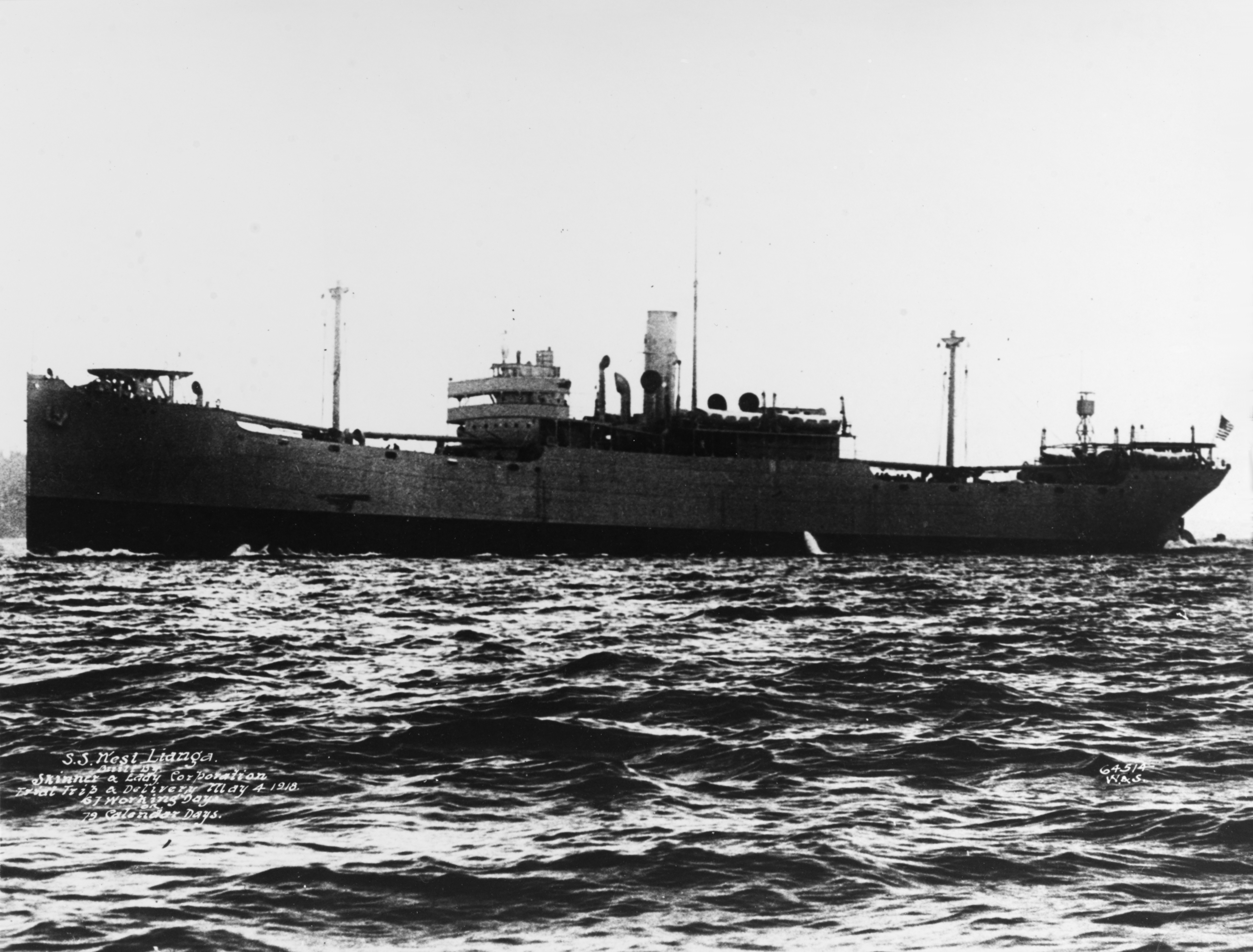
- West Lianga underway in May 1918

History
- Builder: Skinner & Eddy; Seattle, Washington
- Yard number: 21 (USSB number 1176)
- Laid down: 14 February 1918
- Launched: 20 April 1918
- Sponsored by: Mrs A. E. Knoff
- Completed: 4 May 1918
- Identification: US official number: 216274

History
- Name: USS West Lianga
- Acquired: 19 August 1918
- Commissioned: 19 August 1918
- Decommissioned: 24 June 1919
- Stricken: 24 June 1919
- Fate: returned to USSB
- Name: 1919: West Lianga; 1929: Helen Whittier; 1938: Kalani; 1940: Empire Cheetah; 1942: Hobbema
- Owner: 1919: US Shipping Board; 1929: Los Angeles SS Co; 1935: Matson Line; 1940: Ministry of War Transport; 1942: Netherlands Shipping & Trading Committee
- Operator: 1940: Sir Robert Ropner & Co; 1942: British & Continental Shipping Agency Ltd
- Port of registry: 1919: (United States) Seattle; 1929: (United States) Los Angeles; 1940: (United Kingdom) London; 1942: (Netherlands) The Hague
- Identification: US official number: 216274 (1919-40); UK official number 168041 (1940–42); Code letters LKQR (1919–35); Call sign KJAO (1935–40); Call sign GMJT (1940–42)
- Fate: sunk by torpedo, 1942

General characteristics
- Type: Design 1013 ship
- Tonnage: 5,673 GRT (as built); 5,507 GRT (as Kalani); 5,508 GRT (as Empire Cheetah); 8,800 LT DWT
- Displacement: 12,191 t
- Length: 409 ft 5 in (124.79 m) (LPP); 423 ft 9 in (129.16 m) (LOA)
- Beam: 54.2 ft (16.5 m)
- Draft: 24 ft 1.5 in (7.353 m) (mean)
- Depth: 27.1 ft (8.3 m)
- Depth of hold: 29 ft 9 in (9.07 m)
- Propulsion: 1 × steam turbine
- Speed: 11.5 knots (21 km/h)
- Complement: 113 (as USS West Lianga)
- Armament: World War I: 1 × 5" (12.7 mm)/51 caliber gun; 1 × QF 6 pdr (76 mm) gun (57 mm (2.2 in))

USS West Lianga (ID-2758) was a United States Navy cargo ship in World War I. She was later called Helen Whittier and Kalani in civilian service under US registry; as Empire Cheetah under UK registry; and as Hobbema under Dutch registry.

West Lianga was launched for the United States Shipping Board (USSB) in May 1918 as a part of the West boats, a series of steel-hulled cargo ships built on the West Coast of the United States for the World War I war effort. West Lianga briefly had the distinction of being the fastest-launched and fastest-completed ocean-going ship in the world. Pressed into cargo service for the US Navy, USS West Lianga was commissioned into the Naval Overseas Transportation Service (NOTS) and completed four round-trip voyages to France for the Navy. After decommissioning in mid 1919, she was briefly in cargo service out of Seattle before being laid up in late 1921.

West Lianga was sold to the Los Angeles Steamship Company (LASSCO) in early 1929, refurbished, and renamed Helen Whittier for intercoastal cargo service. When Matson Navigation Company purchased LASSCO in 1931, Helen Whittier frequently sailed on Matson's Hawaiian sugar routes. She was renamed Kalani in 1938 and continued in Hawaiian service until 1940 when she was sold to British interests to help fill the United Kingdom's urgent need for merchant ships.

After sailing to the UK as Kalani, the ship was renamed Empire Cheetah and sailed in transatlantic convoys, making three round trips between February 1941 and May 1942. At that time, Empire Cheetah was transferred to Dutch interests and renamed Hobbema. She successfully completed one transatlantic roundtrip under Dutch registry and was on the homeward leg of her second in Convoy SC 107, when that convoy was attacked by a wolf pack of German submarines. Shortly after midnight on 4 November 1942, Hobbema was struck in the engine room by a single torpedo fired by German submarine U-132. Of Hobbema's complement of 44 men and British gunners aboard, only 16 survived the attack. Hobbema was one of 19 Allied ships in the convoy sunk by German submarines. The sinking of Hobbema (or possibly Hatimura, also sunk by U-132 at the same time) resulted in one of the largest non-nuclear man-made explosions in history, with the German submarine also destroyed by the ensuing explosion.

== Design and construction ==
The West ships were cargo ships of similar size and design built by several shipyards on the West Coast of the United States for the USSB for emergency use in World War I. All were given names that began with the word West, like West Lianga, one of some 24 West ships built by Skinner & Eddy of Seattle, Washington. West Lianga (Skinner & Eddy No. 21; USSB No. 1176) was laid down on 14 February 1918. When she was launched on 20 April with an elapsed time of 55 working days—65 calendar days—from keel laying to launch, it was reported in the New York Times as a new world-record.

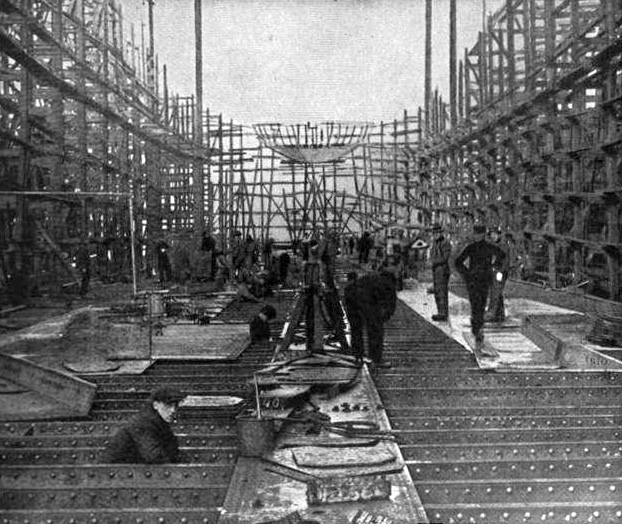
West Lianga under construction, c. February 1918

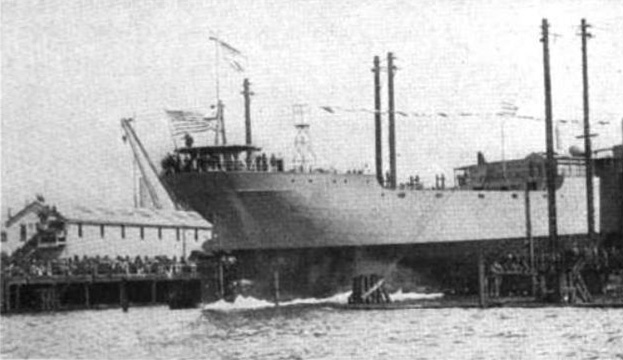
The launch of West Lianga on 4 May 1918

When all remaining post-launch work on West Lianga was completed and she was delivered on 4 May, 67 working days after her keel laying, it was another world record for ocean-going ships. By 1920, West Lianga still counted as the third-fastest delivery, behind two ships that were over one-third smaller than West Lianga. Shipbuilder Skinner & Eddy received a $71,600 bonus ($1.5 million today) for completing West Lianga early.

West Lianga was 5,673 gross register tons (GRT), and was 409 feet 5 inches (124.79 m) long (between perpendiculars) and 54 feet 2 inches (16.51 m) abeam. West Lianga had a steel hull and a deadweight tonnage of 8,800 DWT. A single steam turbine drove her single propeller, and gave her a speed of 11.5-knot (21 km/h).

== World War I ==
West Lianga's activities after her 4 May delivery to the USSB are not entirely clear. Many West ships, to avoid sailing empty to the East Coast, loaded grain products intended for the United Kingdom, France, and Italy and sailed to Europe without unloading or transferring their cargo, (Note: This practice avoided extra handling of the cargo and the USSB, by prior arrangement, then received an equivalent amount of cargo space in foreign ships for other American cargos.) but it is not known whether West Lianga did so or not. Whatever her early activities, West Lianga was handed over to the United States Navy at Brooklyn in August 1918 and assigned the identification number 2758. USS West Lianga was commissioned into the NOTS on 19 August.

At New York, West Lianga took on a load of 6,882 tons of materiel for the United States Army and a deck-load of 32 trucks and left for France in a convoy. After unloading her cargo at Bordeaux, she returned to New York on 16 October. After voyage repairs, she loaded another 6,685 tons of cargo for the Quartermaster Corps and left for Europe on 3 November. West Lianga was en route to France when the Armistice that ended fighting was signed on 11 November. West Lianga delivered her cargo to Saint-Nazaire and took on a load of 1,700 tons for delivery to the United States. After leaving France on 21 December, West Lianga arrived at New York on 4 January 1919.

After shifting to New Orleans and taking on a load of cargo there, West Lianga began her third voyage to France. After making her delivery at Brest, the cargo ship took on a load of steel rails and sand as ballast and sailed for Newport News, Virginia, where she arrived on 21 March. She loaded railroad supplies for the Quartermaster Corps and sailed on 4 April on what would be her final NOTS trip to France. After delivery at La Pallice, West Lianga returned to New York on 10 June. Two weeks later, she was decommissioned, struck from the Navy list, and returned to the USSB.

== Interwar career ==
After her return to the USSB in June 1919, West Lianga returned to Seattle and was based there for several years of operation. Her United States official number was 216274. On 7 September 1921, the ship was laid up in the reserve fleet at Norfolk. On 19 February 1929, the USSB sold West Lianga to the LASSCO for $100,000 on the basis of unrestricted operation. LASSCO, which announced plans for a $50,000 overhaul and reconditioning of the ship for operation on its Arrow Line intercoastal cargo service, paid ten percent in cash and signed a note for the balance to be paid over the next ten years.

On 12 March, LASSCO changed West Lianga's port of registry from Seattle to Los Angeles, and on 26 March, announced that the ship had been renamed Helen Whittier after the daughter of California oil pioneer Max Whittier. Her code letters were LKQR. LASSCO also announced that Helen Whittier, to be operated by Sudden and Christenson Steamship Company for LASSCO, was scheduled to sail from Baltimore on 25 April to begin her intercoastal service.

Helen Whittier's activities over the next two years were not recorded in contemporary newspaper accounts, but she was affected by the absorption of LASSCO into its former competitor, Matson Navigation Company, on 1 January 1931. In late August 1931, Helen Whittier was added to Matson's Hawaiian sugar service to Gulf Coast and North Atlantic ports.

Helen Whittier had returned to intercoastal service by early 1934 when The New York Times reported that she had sailed from San Francisco on 23 March and arrived at New York on 25 April. In June that same year, Helen Whittier was one of the Matson ships added to carry food cargo to Hawaii. Shipments of food from the mainland—which accounted for up to 90% of Hawaii's needs—had been curtailed as a coastwise strike had affected all ports except Los Angeles. Helen Whittier sailed on her first food delivery on 23 June with 2,500 tons of food from Los Angeles to Honolulu.

By 1935, her call sign was LKAO, and this had superseded her code letters. In February 1935, Helen Whittier was returned to the Hawaiian sugar service full-time. During her time on this service, Helen Whittier often called at New York. One typical voyage, as tracked in The New York Times, began when she left New York on 23 November for Honolulu, passed through the Panama Canal on 4 December, and arrived at Honolulu. Helen Whittier left there on 11 January 1936 and arrived at New York again on 16 February. Occasionally, Helen Whittier would make side trips to Baltimore for voyage repairs between her arrival at New York and her next departure for Hawaii. The cargo ship continued her Honolulu – New York service through September 1936.

In 1938, Matson renamed the ship Kalani, and continued using her in Hawaiian service through 1940. On 15 July 1940, Matson received the permission of the United States Maritime Commission (USMC), a successor to the USSB, to sell Kalani to Sir Robert Ropner & Co, Ltd, of West Hartlepool. Six days after the approval, Kalani, now under British registry, left Los Angeles for New York.

== World War II ==
Kalani, acquired to fill the United Kingdom's urgent need for merchant ships, was operated by Ropner under the authority of the Ministry of War Transport. After leaving Panama on 4 August, Kalani arrived at New York on 13 August. Kalani shuttled between New York, Albany, and Boston, ending up at Baltimore on 25 August. Sailing from there on 15 September with a load of pig iron, she arrived at Halifax five days later. She left Halifax for Liverpool as a part of convoy HX 78 on 4 October but had to turn back and put in at Sydney, Nova Scotia. Kalani set out again on 15 October as a part of Convoy SC 8, a Sydney – Liverpool convoy. Kalani left the convoy and arrived at Clyde on 31 October.

=== Empire Cheetah ===
Kalani was renamed Empire Cheetah on 12 November, two weeks into a three-and-a-half-month stay at Clyde. Her port of registry was London. Her United Kingdom official number was 168041, and her call sign was GMJT. Empire Cheetah left on her first transatlantic voyage under her new name when she sailed with convoy OB 288 on 18 February 1941. After the convoy came under attack by German bombers and the convoy escorts left, the convoy dispersed. Although nine convoy ships were sunk by six German and two Italian submarines on 23–24 February, Empire Cheetah safely reached her destination of Philadelphia on 10 March.

After taking on a load of steel, Empire Cheetah sailed for Halifax, and then on to Newport, Monmouthshire, as a part of convoy HX 122, arriving on 9 May. She sailed for Swansea on 27 May, and on to Milford Haven on 9 June. On 26 June, she sailed as a part of convoy OB 339 but put back into Milford Haven with defects. Empire Cheetah tried again as a part of convoy OB 343 on 6 July but had to return once again, putting in at Clyde on 9 July.

After a month at Clyde, Empire Cheetah set out a third time for North America in convoy ON 7 which, although dispersed mid-ocean, lost no ships to submarines. Empire Cheetah successfully reached her destination of Boston on 3 September. From there she made her way to Philadelphia on 3 October, and on to Sydney on 23 October. There she joined convoy SC 51 sailing for Holyhead and Manchester the same day with a cargo of grain, steel, and cotton. She arrived at Holyhead on 8 November, but left for Liverpool three days later. After returning to Holyhead later in the month, Empire Cheetah sailed in convoy BB 106 to Barry, where she arrived on 1 December.

Empire Cheetah spent two and a half months at Barry before sailing to Swansea on 14 February 1942. Heading to Milford Haven on 23 February, she sailed the next day as a part of convoy ON 70 headed to Portland, Maine, where she safely arrived on 20 March after an intermediate stop at Halifax from 15 to 18 March. Four days later, Empire Cheetah sailed for Boston. She left Boston on 12 April for Halifax and left there in convoy SC 80 five days later for Hull with a general cargo. Empire Cheetah arrived at Loch Ewe on 2 May and sailed the next day for Methil. After arriving at Methil on 6 May, she headed to her destination of Hull on 7 May.

=== Hobbema ===
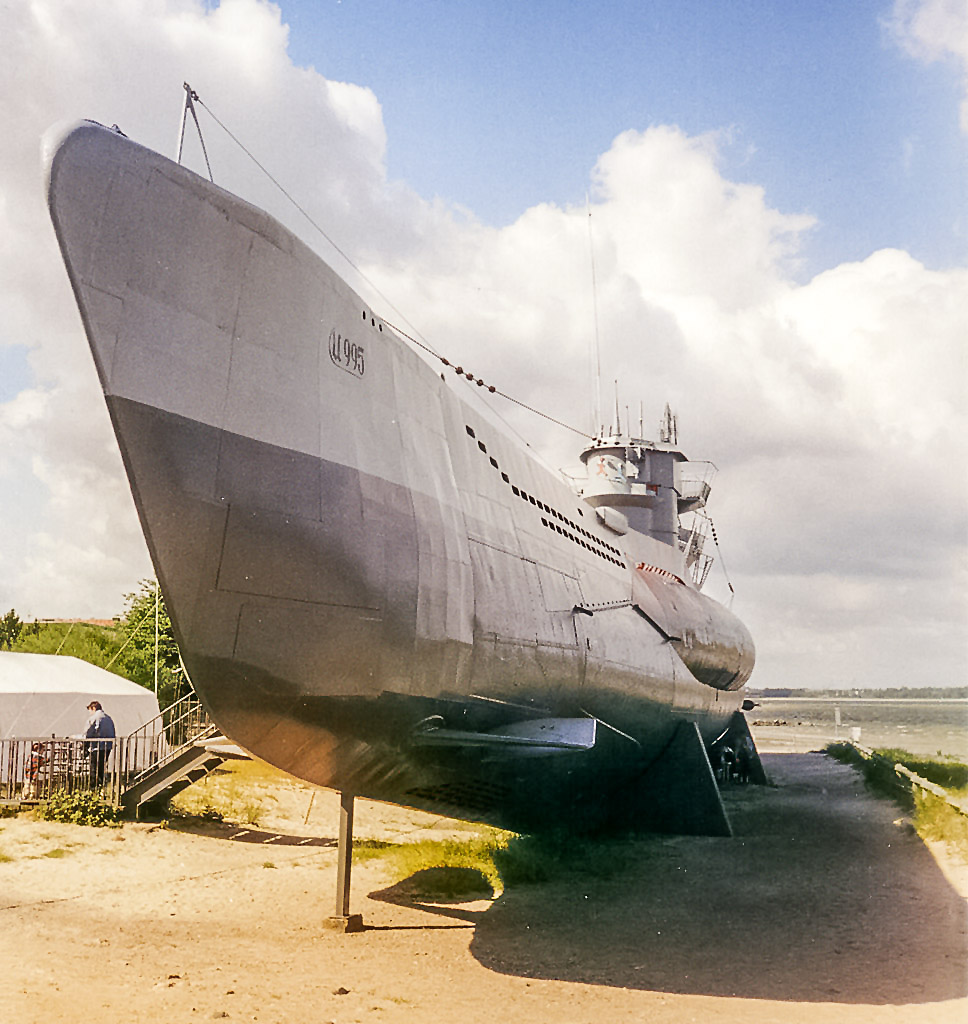
U-132, the submarine that sank Hobbema on 4 November 1942, was a Type VIIC U-boat similar to this one, German submarine U-995, a museum ship in Laboe seen here in 2001.

On 18 May at Hull, Empire Cheetah was transferred to the Dutch government and assigned to the Netherlands Shipping & Trading Committee. The ship's name was changed to Hobbema and the port of registry changed to The Hague, even though the Netherlands were under German occupation. Hobbema was placed under the management of the British & Continental Shipping Agency Ltd.

Hobbema left Hull on 23 May and called at Methil and Loch Ewe before sailing for New York as a part of convoy ON 100 on 2 June. After an intermediate stop at Halifax, Hobbema arrived at the Cape Cod Canal on 19 June and proceeded on to New York where she arrived the next day. After making two trips to Philadelphia and back, she left for Cape Cod Bay to form up with convoy BX 28 for Halifax, where she arrived on 11 July. Hobbema sailed from Halifax to Sydney, Nova Scotia, in convoy HS 28, and from there sailed on 17 July for Liverpool with convoy SC 92. After her arrival on 31 July, she spent nearly a month at Liverpool before joining convoy ON 126 for New York, arriving at that destination on 19 September.

Location of the sinking of Hobbema.

Hobbema sailed the next day for Newport News and took on 7,000 long tons (7,100 t) of general cargo and ammunition and returned to New York on 15 October. She sailed nine days later as a part of convoy SC 107 headed for Liverpool. On 30 October, German submarine German submarine U-522 sighted the eastbound convoy and relayed the convoy's position to the Wolfpack Veilchen of thirteen U-boats (Note: Wolfpack Veilchen (English: violet) consisted of submarines U-71, U-84, U-89, U-132, U-381, U-402, U-437, U-438, U-442, U-454, U-571, U-658, and U-704.) and to two other U-boats—U-522 and U-521—patrolling nearby. After getting into position and dodging convoy escorts over the next two days, the wolf pack attacked the convoy on the night of 1–2 November and sank seven ships. Another ship was sunk during the day on 2 November. On the night of 2–3 November the convoy sailed through thick fog that concealed its location and kept the U-boats at bay. At dawn the fog had lifted and another ship was sunk.

After dark, the wolf pack struck again. At 00:10 (Note: John Waters, who was with convoy SC 107 aboard Gemini reports these times as being an hour earlier. The Axis and Allies may have been using different time zones when reporting the sequence of events.) on 4 November U-132 closed in and torpedoed Hobbema, SS Empire Lynx and SS Hatimura. At 00:15, a single torpedo from U-132 hit Hobbema on the starboard side in the engine room, immediately knocking out power to the ship, and caused her to begin rapidly sinking. The lifeboats and several life rafts from the port side were launched with 16 men on board. The ship's master and 20 crewmen along with 7 British gunners died in the attack and sinking. US Navy tugs Uncas and Pessacus rescued Hobbema's survivors.

At 00:40 the entire convoy and nearby U-boats were jolted by a very heavy explosion thought to have been one of the largest prior to atomic bomb testing. The explosion stopped the engine of the tug Uncas rescuing survivors six miles astern of the convoy. SS Titus was rescuing survivors from Empire Lynx when the explosion lifted her bow so violently the crew believed Titus had been torpedoed. The crew abandoned ship before the master realized Titus was undamaged and reboarded to sail to England with a skeleton crew including some Empire Lynx and Hatimura survivors. Titus was drydocked upon arrival in England, but the only damage found was a small dent in her port side. U-132 is believed to have been destroyed by the explosion. The cause of the explosion is unknown, but it is assumed to have resulted from detonation of the ammunition cargo aboard either Hobbema or Hatimura. In all, 19 Allied ships were sunk from convoy SC 107.

== See also ==
- Operation CHASE for a description of experimental detonation of obsolete munition cargoes in sinking ships to simulate nuclear testing.

== Bibliography ==
- Crowell, Benedict; Robert Forrest Wilson (1921). The Road to France: The Transportation of Troops and Military Supplies, 1917–1918. How America Went to War: An Account From Official Sources of the Nation's War Activities, 1917–1920. New Haven: Yale University Press. OCLC 18696066.
- Hurley, Edward N. (1920). The New Merchant Marine. New York: Century. OCLC 751444.
- —— (1927). The Bridge to France. Philadelphia: J.B. Lippincott. OCLC 1348068.
- Silverstone, Paul H. (2006). The New Navy, 1883–1922. New York: Routledge. ISBN 978-0-415-97871-2. OCLC 63171106.
- United States House of Representatives, Select Committee on U. S. Shipping Board Operations (1920). Shipping Board Operations. Washington, D.C.: Government Printing Office. OCLC 64558341.
