= USS West Haven =

Cargo ship sunk in 1942

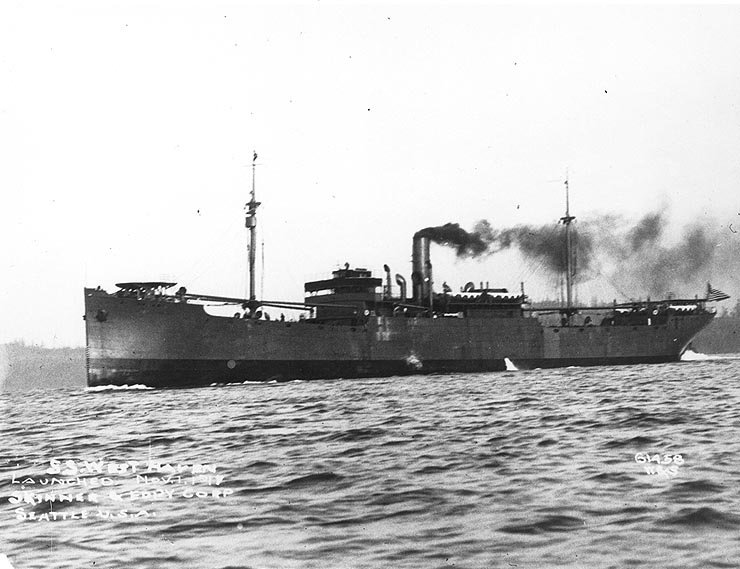
- USS West Haven under way, circa December 1917

History

United States
- Name: USS West Haven
- Owner: 1918: US Shipping Board; 1920: Atlantic, Gulf & Pacific SSC; 1922: US Shipping Board; 1929: LASSCO; 1937: Matson Line; 1940: Ministry of War Transport
- Builder: Skinner & Eddy, Seattle
- Yard number: 10
- Laid down: 13 August 1917
- Launched: 1 November 1917
- Acquired: 24 December 1917
- Commissioned: 18 June 1918 – 21 January 1920
- In service: 18 June 1918 – 2 November 1942
- Renamed: War Flame 17; USS West Haven 18; West Haven 19; Marian Otis Chandler 29; Onomea 38; Empire Leopard 40

General characteristics
- Type: Cargo ship
- Tonnage: 5,520 grt (5,600 nom.); 8,480 dwt (8,800 nom.)
- Displacement: 12,191 tons
- Length: 423 ft 9 in (129.16 m); 410 ft 5 in (125.10 m) bp
- Beam: 54 ft (16 m)
- Draft: 24 ft 2 in (7.37 m)
- Depth of hold: 29 ft 9 in (9.07 m)
- Installed power: 1 × 3-cylinder 2,800 IHP Puget Sound Machinery triple expansion
- Propulsion: Single screw
- Speed: 11 kn (20 km/h)
- Complement: (World War I): 86; (World War II): 42 (34 crew and 7 gunners)
- Armament: (World War I): 1 × 6", 1 × 6-pounder

USS West Haven (ID-2159) was a steel–hulled freighter that served the United States Navy in World War I, and later servedin convoys in the Battle of the Atlantic in World War II.

Originally named War Flame, West Haven completed two supply voyages for the Navy in World War I, and two relief missions in the immediate postwar period before being decommissioned. Between the wars, West Haven was in commercial service as West Haven and operated for several different companies. In 1929 her name was changed to Marian Otis Chandler and in 1938 to Onomea.

Following the outbreak of World War II, Onomea was acquired by the British Ministry of War Transport, renamed Empire Leopard and placed into convoy service on the North Atlantic, delivering vital supplies from the United States to Britain. In November 1942, while operating with Convoy SC 107, Empire Leopard was torpedoed and sunk by U-402, commanded by U-boat ace Siegfried von Forstner.

== Construction and design ==
West Haven was built as War Flame in Seattle, Washington in 1917 at Plant No. 1 of the Skinner & Eddy Corporation. A product of the United States Shipping Board's emergency wartime shipbuilding program, War Flame was laid down on 13 August 1917 and launched on 1 November 1917 in what was then apparently a new world keel-to-launch record of just 67 working days (81 calendar days). The ship was completed an additional 43 working (54 calendar) days later on 24 December 1917—a keel-to-delivery time of 110 working days (135 calendar days), establishing a new company record.

When completed, War Flame had a deadweight tonnage of 8,480 tons (8,800 nominal) and a gross register tonnage of 5,520 tons (5,600 nominal). The ship had an overall length of 423 feet 9 inches, a beam of 54 feet and a draft of 24 feet 2 inches. War Flame was powered by a three-cylinder triple expansion steam engine supplied by the Puget Sound Machinery Depot of Seattle, with cylinders of 25, 42 and 72 inches respectively and a stroke of 48 inches, which drove a single screw propeller and delivered a service speed of 11 knots.

== Service history ==
=== U.S. Navy service, 1918–1919 ===
After completion, War Flame was handed over on 24 December 1917 to the U.S. Navy, who named the ship West Haven. On 18 June 1918, the vessel was commissioned into service at New Orleans as USS West Haven (ID-2159) for operation with the Naval Overseas Transportation Service (NOTS).

Laden with general Army supplies, West Haven departed New Orleans on 3 July and steamed to Norfolk, Virginia, where she joined a convoy sailing for Europe. She arrived at Bordeaux, France, on 12 August 1918 and unloaded her cargo over the ensuing days. Departing Bordeaux on the 21st, West Haven arrived at New York on 5 September. After shifting to Philadelphia the same day, the vessel there took on board 5,125 tons of general Army supplies before departing on 17 September and steaming to Norfolk, whence she got underway on 23 September in a convoy bound for France.

After discharging her cargo at Brest, West Haven departed that French port on 3 November. While the vessel was steaming home, the armistice was signed on 11 November 1918 ending World War I. However, the return of peace did not change the ship's duties, as there remained the postwar task of reconstructing Europe which had been devastated by the war.

Following a brief layover in New York, West Haven loaded 7,075 tons of general Army cargo at Baltimore and sailed on 5 December, bound for France. The ship made La Pallice on 2 January 1919, discharged her cargo over the ensuing days, picked up a return Army cargo, and sailed for Norfolk on the 26th. En route home, she ran low on fuel and was forced to reduce her speed to three and one-half knots. She finally reached Bermuda on 28 February.

After topping up her bunkers, West Haven arrived at Norfolk on 4 March to load 673 tons of cargo for her fourth and final voyage for NOTS. Departing 28 March, she arrived at La Pallice on 12 April where she discharged her cargo. Moving on to Brest, West Haven loaded 2,306 tons of captured German ordnance, aviation supplies and 375 tons of steel rail ballast for the return journey. Departing for New York on 17 May, West Haven made an intermediate stop on 23 May at Ponta Delgada, Azores, probably to refuel, before continuing on to her destination.

Some days later, West Haven came across the stricken British steamer Beechleaf. The 10,000-ton cargo carrier had been in transit from Baton Rouge to Ireland with a cargo of fuel oil when her engines and steering gear were disabled by a fire which killed one crewman and severely burned another. West Haven took the disabled vessel in tow to Ambrose Light, arriving 7 June, before continuing on to New York where she berthed the following day.

Soon after arriving at New York on 8 June, West Haven was placed in line for demobilization. She was accordingly decommissioned on 21 January 1920, simultaneously struck from the Navy List and returned to the USSB.

=== Atlantic, Gulf and Pacific Steamship service, early 1920s ===
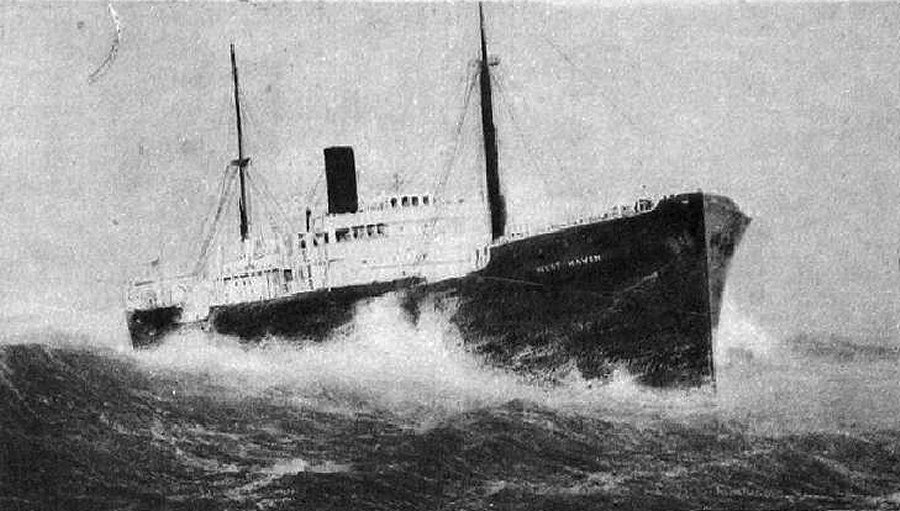
West Haven at sea, early 1920s

After decommissioning from the Navy, West Haven was returned to the USSB and sold in 1920 to the Atlantic, Gulf and Pacific Steamship Corporation, which appears to have put the vessel into service as a coastal freighter, operating between the west and east coasts of the U.S.

In November 1921, West Haven sailed from the east coast to Los Angeles with the unusual deck cargo of a fifty-ton Lawler racing yacht, Idalia, owned by C. B. Eyer of the Golden State Woolen Mills. At Los Angeles Harbor, the yacht was lifted from West Haven's deck by slings suspended from shear legs at the docks of the Los Angeles Shipbuilding and Drydock Company, after which West Haven was moved away and the yacht lowered into the water. Idalia's arrival in this unusual manner was hailed as an innovation likely to give "great stimulus to the yachting spirit" of Los Angeles.

In September 1922, West Haven was repossessed by the USSB after the Atlantic, Gulf and Pacific Steamship Corporation went bankrupt. No further records of the ship's movements appear until 1929, indicating that the USSB may have laid the vessel up through the 1920s because of the postwar oversupply of shipping.

=== LASSCO and Matson Line service, late 1920s–1930s ===
In February 1929, West Haven was sold by the USSB to the Los Angeles Steamship Company (LASSCO), who at this time were in the process of expanding their line from four ships to ten. LASSCO renamed the ship Marian Otis Chandler after the wife of LASSCO's founder, Harry Chandler, and placed the vessel into service once again as a coastal freighter.

In a repeat performance of West Haven's rescue of the stricken freighter Beechleaf in June 1919, Marian Otis Chandler participated in the rescue of another vessel on the high seas, the USSB freighter West Hardaway, in December 1929. After battling gales for three weeks in the North Atlantic, West Hardaway had run out of fuel and was drifting helpless when Marian Otis Chandler arrived on the scene to tow the vessel 500 miles to Halifax, Nova Scotia. West Hardaway, which had been on a voyage from Grangemouth, Scotland to Norfolk, Virginia, sustained some damage in the episode.

In June 1930, Marian Otis Chandler was placed into service between Los Angeles and Hawaii after the LASSCO liner City of Honolulu was badly damaged in a fire. Marian Otis Chandler continued making runs to Hawaii until early 1931, when she resumed coastal service. Over the next few years she operated from Los Angeles to west coast ports such as Seattle and Aberdeen, Washington; Portland and St. Helens, Oregon; and to east coast ports including Richmond, Virginia and Philadelphia.

By about 1934, Marian Otis Chandler appears to have been shifted back to making regular runs to Hawaii. In 1937, the Los Angeles Steamship Company was wound up and its assets sold to the parent company, the Matson Line. The Matson Line continued to operate Marian Otis Chandler in the Hawaiian trade into the late 1930s. In 1938, Matson renamed the ship Onomea.

=== World War II ===
In 1940, Onomea was acquired by the British Ministry of War Transport (MoWT) in order to help alleviate the shipping shortage caused by losses to German U-boats. Renamed Empire Leopard, the ship spent the next two years in convoy service between the United States and Britain, in the Battle of the Atlantic. Between February 1941 and August 1942, Empire Leopard completed five round trips across the Atlantic, carrying vital supplies of steel, sulphur and other goods from the United States to the British industrial cities of Liverpool and Hull.

After crossing from Liverpool to the United States in February–March 1941, Empire Leopard picked up a cargo of steel at Baltimore and joined Convoy HX 130 at Halifax, Nova Scotia bound for Liverpool and Hull, arriving at the latter destination in late June. Returning to Hampton Roads, Virginia in July, Empire Leopard loaded a cargo of sulphur and completed her second round trip to Britain with Convoy SC 50, arriving at Hull on 8 November.

Empire Leopard's third round trip was completed from New York with Convoy SC 67 in February 1942, this time with a cargo of general goods bound for the Tyne, England. The fourth was made from Philadelphia to Hull with Convoy SC 82 in April–May 1942 with a cargo of steel and general supplies. Empire Leopard's fifth and final successful round trip between Britain and the United States was completed from Cape Cod, Massachusetts to Hull in August 1942, sailing in Convoy SC 95 with a cargo of steel and general goods. Two ships in this latter convoy were sunk by U-boats during the crossing.

==== Final voyages ====
Following the discharge of her cargoes at Hull, Empire Leopard made her final voyage to North America via Methil and Loch Ewe, Scotland to Botwood, Newfoundland via St. John's in September–October 1942. At Botwood, the ship took on a cargo of 7,410 tons of zinc concentrates and munitions and sailed for St. John's on 24 October, arriving 26 October. At St. John's, Empire Leopard joined another 44 merchant ships and a small number of escorts preparing to sail for Liverpool as Convoy SC 107. The convoy departed for Liverpool on 30 October.

On 2 November 1942, Convoy SC 107 was intercepted by the German wolf pack Veilchen ("Violet"). U-boat ace Siegfried von Forstner commanding U-402 was the first to score a kill. At around 4:10 am, U-402 fired two torpedoes, sinking the cargo ships Dalcroy and Rinos. U-402 struck again a few hours later, firing two torpedoes at 8:03 am, one of which hit and sank Empire Antelope and the other hitting Empire Leopard, which caused the ship to explode. All the crew on board Empire Antelope were rescued, but of the 34 crew and seven gunners aboard Empire Leopard, only three crew members survived. The survivors from both vessels were picked up by the British rescue ship Stockport and transferred to Reykjavík, arriving there on 8 November. Wolf pack Vielchen sank more than a dozen ships from Convoy SC 107 (including, coincidentally, Hobbema, a sister ship of Empire Leopard) before being driven off by Liberator aircraft from No. 120 Squadron RAF a few days later.

== Bibliography ==
- Jordan, Roger H. (2006): The World's Merchant Fleets, 1939: The Particulars And Wartime Fates of 6,000 Ships, Naval Institute Press, ISBN 978-1-59114-959-0.
- Pacific Ports Inc. (1919): Pacific Ports Annual, Fifth Edition, 1919, pp. 64–65, 402–405, Pacific Ports Inc.
- Turner, John Frayn (2002): Fight for the Sea: Naval Adventures from World War II, p. 148, Naval Institute Press, ISBN 978-1-55750-884-3.
