= Convoy SC 107 =

Convoy during naval battles of the Second World War

- Part of Battle of the St. Lawrence, Battle of the Atlantic
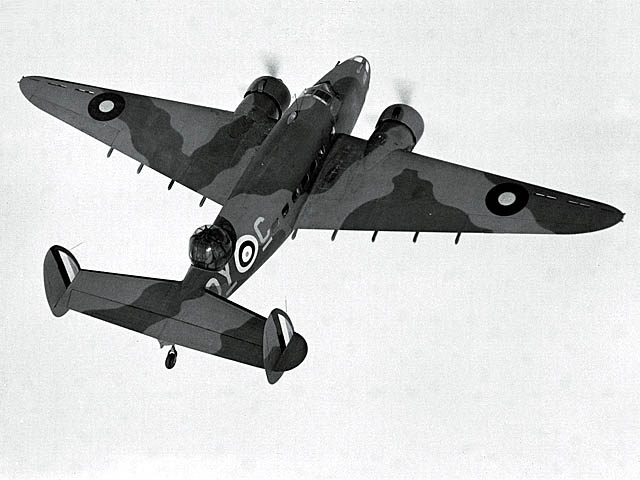
- RCAF Lockheed Hudson, like the one that sank U-658
Date	29 October–4 November 1942
Location	North Atlantic
Result	German victory

Belligerents
United Kingdom; Canada	Germany

Commanders and leaders
VADM B C Watson; LCDR D.W. Piers RCN	Admiral Karl Dönitz

Strength
39 freighters 2 destroyers 6 corvettes	17 submarines

Casualties and losses
15 freighters sunk (83,790GRT); 150 killed/drowned	2 submarines sunk 100 killed/drowned (3 sunk, if counting U-520 before the subs attacked)

Convoy SC 107 was the 107th of the numbered series of World War II slow convoys of merchant ships from Sydney, Cape Breton Island to Liverpool. The ships departed New York City on 24 October 1942 and were found and engaged by a wolfpack of U-boats which sank fifteen ships. It was the heaviest loss of ships from any trans-Atlantic convoy through the winter of 1942–43. The attack included one of the largest non-nuclear man-made explosions in history, when U-132 torpedoed ammunition ships SS Hobbema and SS Hatimura - both were sunk, one exploded, with the German submarine also being destroyed in the explosion.

== Background ==
As western Atlantic coastal convoys brought an end to the "Second Happy Time", Admiral Karl Dönitz, the Befehlshaber der U-Boote (BdU) or commander in chief of U-Boats, shifted focus to the mid-Atlantic to avoid aircraft patrols. Although convoy routing was less predictable in the mid-ocean, Dönitz anticipated that the increased numbers of U-boats being produced would be able to effectively search for convoys with the advantage of intelligence gained through B-Dienst decryption of British Naval Cypher Number 3. However, only 20 percent of the 180 trans-Atlantic convoys sailing from the end of July 1942 until the end of April 1943 lost ships to U-boat attack.

== Discovery ==
B-Dienst decrypted message traffic detailing routing and composition of convoy SC 107, and fifteen U-boats of wolfpack Veilchen (violet) were deployed to intercept it. The convoy was found and reported by U-522, patrolling the same general area as wolfpack Veilchen, on 29 October as the Western Local Escort Force turned the convoy over to Escort Group C-4, supported by the convoy rescue ship Stockport. River-class destroyer HMCS Restigouche obtained a HF/DF bearing when U-522 sent the first convoy contact report at 16:24, and the convoy made a course change after dark in the hope of evading the shadowing U-boat. Soon after, a No. 10 Squadron RCAF Digby bomber sunk U-520, patrolling in the area of the convoy. As the boats of Veilchen were sailing towards their assembly point, wolfpack boat U-658 was sunk by a RCAF Lockheed Hudson. Wolfpack boat U-438 found the convoy and released U-522 to sail off for other prey.

== First attack on 1/2 November ==
Stockport and Restigouche located 25 HF/DF transmissions from the eight U-boats in contact with the convoy on the afternoon of 1 November, but the single destroyer was unable to investigate all of them. At sunset Flower-class corvette HMS Celandine was sent to investigate the closest HF/DF fix eight miles off the port quarter; and Restigouche made a sweep astern. After sunset, a clearing sky revealed the flickering aurora borealis to port silhouetting the convoy and its three remaining escorts. As Restgouche engaged an ASDIC contact six miles behind the convoy with depth charges and star shells, nervous merchant sailors revealed the convoy location by firing snowflake pyrotechnic mortars.

While Restigouche pursued another U-boat, Kapitänleutnant Siegfried von Forstner's U-402 passed the destroyer at 22:40 while overtaking the silhouetted convoy from astern. When corvette HMCS Arvida had a radar malfunction, U-402 went undetected as it penetrated the starboard side on the convoy screen about midnight to torpedo the British freighter Empire Sunrise. Empire Sunrise fired two flares and most of the ships in convoy fired snowflake mortars. U-402 dived to avoid the rapidly approaching Restigouche whose depth charges were comfortably distant. Restigouche narrowly avoided torpedoes launched a short time later by U-381 as the convoy changed course 40 degrees to port to confuse the U-boats.

While Celandine dropped astern to screen Stockport rescuing survivors from Empire Sunrise, U-402 twice more penetrated the convoy screen where Celadine had been and torpedoed the Greek freighter Rinos and British freighters Dalcroy, Empire Antelope, and Empire Leopard. U-402 was lightly damaged by machine-gun fire from corvette HMCS Amherst and by a 3-inch (76 mm) projectile from a merchant ship. Kapitänleutnant von Forstner would receive the Knight's Cross of the Iron Cross for his work in U-402 during this convoy and in Convoy SC 118 on the next patrol. U-522 torpedoed the Greek freighter Mount Pelion and British freighters Hartington and Maratima. During the melee, merchant ships avoided two torpedoes launched by U-84, three from U-521, and four from U-442 ; while Arvida avoided damage from machine-gun fire by several merchant ships who thought she might be a U-boat.

== 2 November ==
Rain and misty weather caused the U-boats to lose contact after U-522 torpedoed Greek freighter Parthenon in a daylight attack. Escort Group C-4 was reinforced by the V-class destroyer Vanessa from convoy HX 213 before nine U-boats regained contact when visibility improved on 3 November.

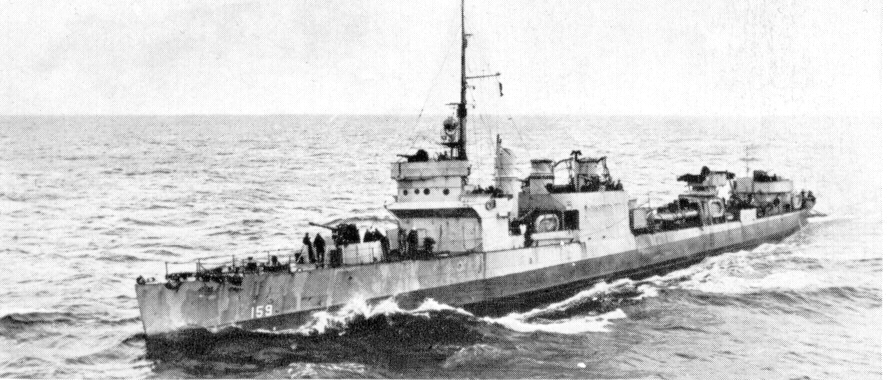
USS Schenck at sea

== Second attack on 3/4 November ==
Celandine, Amherst and Vanessa attacked the gathering U-boats unsuccessfully while the convoy reassembled after losing cohesion in the fog. One of the straggling merchant ships avoided two torpedoes launched by U-438. U-521 torpedoed the American tanker Hahira shortly after dawn on 3 November. Stockport was carrying 350 survivors by the time she picked up those from Hahira. Harbor tugs USS Uncas and Pessacus had been attached to the convoy for passage to Iceland, and were detailed to act as rescue ships because Stockport was carrying three times her intended capacity. The little tugs were ordered to keep their running lights on in their assigned rescue positions astern of the convoy to minimize chances they might be mistaken for U-boats. U-89 torpedoed the convoy commodore's freighter Jeypore after sunset on 3 November; but snowflake illumination was minimal because most ships had exhausted their supply of pyrotechnics during the earlier attacks. Corvettes HMCS Algoma and HMCS Moosejaw made unsuccessful counterattacks before U-132 torpedoed the Dutch freighter SS Hobbema and British freighters Empire Lynx and Hatimura at 23:10. The entire convoy and nearby U-boats were shaken thirty minutes later by a heavy explosion believed to have been one of the largest prior to atomic bomb testing. The magnitude of the explosion temporarily stopped the engine of the rescue tug six miles astern of the convoy and caused several ships to believe they had been torpedoed. Titus was abandoned before the captain realized she was undamaged and returned with a skeleton crew including survivors from other ships. U-boats submerged at a depth of 200 feet reported being severely jolted, and U-132 is believed to have been destroyed by the detonation. The cause of the explosion was undetermined, but assumed to have resulted from detonation of the ammunition cargo of either Hobbema or Hatimura while they were sinking.

On 4 November, Arvida and Celandine were detached to Iceland with Stockport and the two tugs overcrowded with a total of 590 survivors. U-89 torpedoed the British freighter Daleby shortly before the convoy escort was reinforced by the United States Coast Guard Treasury-class cutter Ingham and the Wickes-class destroyers Leary and Schenck from Iceland. No. 120 Squadron RAF B-24 Liberators scrambled from Iceland drove off the remaining U-boats, and the convoy reached Liverpool on 10 November.

== Ships in convoy ==
Name	Flag	Dead	Tonnage gross register tons (GRT)	Cargo	Notes
Agios Georgios (1911)	Greece		4,248	Grain & general cargo	Survived this convoy and convoy ONS 5
Ann Skakel (1920)	United States		4,949		Detached to Iceland 7 Nov; survived this convoy and convoy SC 118
Benedick (1928)	United Kingdom		6,978	Furnace fuel oil	Survived this convoy, convoy SC 122 and convoy SC 130
Berkel (1930)	Netherlands		2,130	Lumber	Survived this convoy, convoy ON 154 and convoy ONS 5
Bruarfoss (1927)	Iceland		1,580		Detached to Iceland 7 Nov
Carrier (1921)	Norway		3,036	Grain	
Dalcroy (1930)	United Kingdom	0	4,558	1,809 tons steel & lumber	Sunk by U-402
Daleby (1929)	United Kingdom	0	4,640	8,500 tons grain	Veteran of convoy SC 26; sunk by U-89
Empire Antelope (1919)	United Kingdom	0	4,945	5,560 tons general cargo	Veteran of convoy SC 94; sunk by U-402
Empire Leopard (1917)	United Kingdom	37	5,676	7,410 tons zinc concentrates	Sunk by U-402
Empire Lynx (1917)	United Kingdom	0	6,379	7,850 tons general cargo	Sunk by U-132
Empire Shackleton (1941)	United Kingdom		7,068	Steel & lumber	CAM ship; survived to be sunk the following month in convoy ON 154
Empire Sunrise (1941)	United Kingdom	0	7,459	10,000 tons steel & lumber	Sunk by U-402 & U-84
Empire Union (1924)	United Kingdom		5,952	General cargo	Survived to be sunk the following month in convoy ON 154
Fairwater (1928)	United Kingdom		4,108	Steel & lumber	
Geisha (1921)	Norway		5,113	General cargo	Ship's master was convoy vice-commodore
Granfoss (1913)	Norway		1,461	Flour	
Hahira (1920)	United States	3	6,855	8,985 tons furnace fuel oil	Sunk by U-521
Hartington (1932)	United Kingdom	24	5,496	Tanks & 8,000 tons wheat	Sunk by U-522, U-438 & U-521
Hatimura (1918)	United Kingdom	4	6,690	Food, steel, ammunition & explosives	Sunk by U-132
Hobbema (1918)	Netherlands	28	5,507	7,000 tons explosives & general cargo	Sunk by U-132
Janeta (1929)	United Kingdom		4,312	Steel & lumber	Survived this convoy and convoy ON 154
Jeypore (1920)	United Kingdom	1	5,318	6,200 tons explosives & general cargo	Carried convoy commodore VADM B C Watson CB DSO; sunk by U-89
L V Stanford (1921)	United States		7,138	Fuel oil	Survived this convoy and convoy SC 121
Maratima (1912)	United Kingdom	32	5,804	7,167 tons explosives & general cargo	Sunk by U-522
Marsa (1928)	United Kingdom		4,405	Steel & lumber	
Mount Pelion (1917)	Greece	7	6,625	7,452 tons general cargo & trucks	Veteran of convoy SC 94; sunk by U-522
New York City (1917)	United Kingdom		2,710	General cargo	Survived this convoy and convoy SC 118
Olney (1928)	United States		7,294	Diesel	Survived this convoy and convoy ON 154
Oropos (1913)	Greece		4,474	Grain	
PLM 17 (1922)	United Kingdom		4,008	Phosphates	Survived damaged by depth charge explosions
Pacific (1914)	Sweden		4,978	General cargo	
Parthenon (1908)	Greece	6	3,189	Paper	Sunk by U-522
USS Pleiades (1939)	United States		3,600		Veteran of convoy ON 67; detached to Iceland
Rinos (1919)	Greece	8	4,649	6,151 tons general cargo & trucks	Sunk by U-402
Stockport (1911)	United Kingdom		1,583		convoy rescue ship
Tidewater (1930)	United States		8,886	Furnace fuel oil	
Titus (1930)	Netherlands		1,712	Flour	Veteran of convoy SC 42
Vest (1920)	Norway		5,074	Grain & lumber	Survived this convoy and convoy ON 154

=== German losses ===
RCAF bombers, patrolling the area of Convoy SC 107, sunk the free-patrolling U-520 on 30 October and wolfpack Veilchen member U-658 on 5 November. Wolfpack Veilchen boat U-132 sunk herself through the explosion caused by her torpedoing of Hobbema (or Hatimura) on 4 November.

== See also ==
- Convoy Battles of World War II
- Operation CHASE for a description of experimental detonation of obsolete munition cargoes in sinking ships to simulate nuclear testing.
