= Cythera =

Cythera may refer to:

Places

- Cythera (island), an island of Greece, also written Kythira, Kythera, Kithira
  - Cytherean: pertaining to the island Cythera
- Cythera (ancient town), an ancient town on the island of Cythera

Ships

- USS Cythera, the name of two United States Navy ships
- Cythera (yacht), a steel ketch, designed and built by Peter A. Fenton, launched in 1962
- Cythera, a yacht lost with all aboard during the Great Blizzard of 1888

Other

- Cythera (video game) a computer game by Ambrosia Software
- Cythera (novel), a 1998 novel by Richard Calder
- In Cythera, a 2012 song by Killing Joke

== See also ==
- Cytherea (disambiguation)
- The Embarkation for Cythera, a painting by French painter Jean-Antoine Watteau
