= Hobbema =

Hobbema may refer to:

- Maskwacis, Alberta, Canada, an unincorporated community formerly named Hobbema
- Meindert Hobbema (1638–1709), a Dutch landscape painter
- SS Hobbema, Dutch cargo ship sunk in World War II
