= German submarine U-132 (1941) =

German World War II submarine

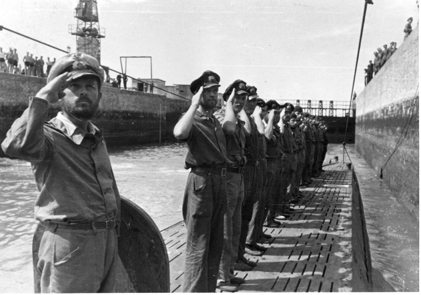
- U-132 returns to La Pallice

History

Nazi Germany
- Name: U-132
- Ordered: 7 August 1939
- Builder: Vegesacker Werft GmbH, Bremen-Vegesack
- Yard number: 11
- Laid down: 10 August 1940
- Launched: 10 April 1941
- Commissioned: 29 May 1941
- Fate: Sunk, 4 November 1942

General characteristics
- Class & type: Type VIIC submarine
- Displacement: 769 tonnes (757 long tons) surfaced; 871 t (857 long tons) submerged
- Length: 67.10 m (220 ft 2 in) o/a; 50.50 m (165 ft 8 in) pressure hull
- Beam: 6.20 m (20 ft 4 in) o/a; 4.70 m (15 ft 5 in) pressure hull
- Height: 9.60 m (31 ft 6 in)
- Draught: 4.74 m (15 ft 7 in)
- Installed power: 2,800–3,200 PS (2,100–2,400 kW; 2,800–3,200 bhp) (diesels); 750 PS (550 kW; 740 shp) (electric)
- Propulsion: 2 shafts; 2 × diesel engines; 2 × electric motors
- Speed: 17.7 knots (32.8 km/h; 20.4 mph) surfaced; 7.6 knots (14.1 km/h; 8.7 mph) submerged
- Range: 8,500 nmi (15,700 km; 9,800 mi) at 10 knots (19 km/h; 12 mph) surfaced; 80 nmi (150 km; 92 mi) at 4 knots (7.4 km/h; 4.6 mph) submerged
- Test depth: 230 m (750 ft); Crush depth: 250–295 m (820–968 ft)
- Complement: 4 officers, 40–56 enlisted
- Armament: 5 × 53.3 cm (21 in) torpedo tubes (four bow, one stern); 14 × torpedoes or 26 TMA mines; 1 × 8.8 cm (3.46 in) deck gun (220 rounds); 1 x 2 cm (0.79 in) C/30 AA gun

Service record
- Part of: 3rd U-boat Flotilla; 29 May 1941 – 4 November 1942
- Identification codes: M 41 284
- Commanders: Kptlt. Ernst Vogelsang; 29 May 1941 – 4 November 1942
- Operations: 4 patrols: 1st patrol: a. 7 September – 21 October 1941; b. 25 – 30 October 1941; 2nd patrol: 15 January – 8 February 1942; 3rd patrol: 10 June – 16 August 1942; 4th patrol: 6 October – 4 November 1942
- Victories: 7 merchant ships sunk (32,356 GRT); 1 warship sunk (2,216 tons); 1 auxiliary warship sunk (557 GRT); 1 merchant ship total loss (4,367 GRT); 1 merchant ship damaged (6,690 GRT)

German submarine U-132 was a Type VIIC U-boat built for Nazi Germany's Kriegsmarine for service during World War II. She was laid down on 10 August 1940 by Vegesacker Werft, Bremen-Vegesack as yard number 11, launched on 10 April 1941 and commissioned on 29 May that year under Kapitänleutnant Ernst Vogelsang.

In four patrols, U-132 sank ten ships for a total of 37,280 gross register tons (GRT) and 2,216 tons. She was a member of three wolfpacks. The submarine was lost after an attack on Convoy SC 107 in November 1942.

== Design ==
German Type VIIC submarines were preceded by the shorter Type VIIB submarines. U-132 had a displacement of 769 tonnes (757 long tons) when at the surface and 871 tonnes (857 long tons) while submerged. She had a total length of 67.10 m (220 ft 2 in), a pressure hull length of 50.50 m (165 ft 8 in), a beam of 6.20 m (20 ft 4 in), a height of 9.60 m (31 ft 6 in), and a draught of 4.74 m (15 ft 7 in). The submarine was powered by two MAN 6-cylinder 4-stroke M 6 V 40/46 four-stroke, six-cylinder supercharged diesel engines producing a total of 2,800 to 3,200 metric horsepower (2,060 to 2,350 kW; 2,760 to 3,160 shp) for use while surfaced, two Brown, Boveri & Cie GG UB 720/8 double-acting electric motors producing a total of 750 metric horsepower (550 kW; 740 shp) for use while submerged. She had two shafts and two 1.23 m (4 ft) propellers. The boat was capable of operating at depths of up to 230 metres (750 ft).

The submarine had a maximum surface speed of 17.7 knots (32.8 km/h; 20.4 mph) and a maximum submerged speed of 7.6 knots (14.1 km/h; 8.7 mph). When submerged, the boat could operate for 80 nautical miles (150 km; 92 mi) at 4 knots (7.4 km/h; 4.6 mph); when surfaced, she could travel 8,500 nautical miles (15,700 km; 9,800 mi) at 10 knots (19 km/h; 12 mph). U-132 was fitted with five 53.3 cm (21 in) torpedo tubes (four fitted at the bow and one at the stern), fourteen torpedoes, one 8.8 cm (3.46 in) SK C/35 naval gun, 220 rounds, and a 2 cm (0.79 in) C/30 anti-aircraft gun. The boat had a complement of between forty-four and sixty.

== Service history ==
=== First patrol ===
U-132 departed on her first patrol when she left Trondheim in Norway on 7 September 1941. Rounding the North Cape, she criss-crossed that part of the Barents Sea northwest of Murmansk before heading further east. She sank two Soviet ships, Argun and SKR-11 Ural on 18 October.

The boat docked in Kirkenes, also in Norway, on 21 October.

=== Second patrol ===
Having moved from Kirkenes back to Trondheim in late October 1941, U-132 commenced her second foray on 15 January 1942. Her route took her due west through the gap between Iceland and the Faroe Islands to a point 10 nmi (19 km; 12 mi) west of Reykjavík. Here she sank USCGC Alexander Hamilton on the 29th.

She then moved to the port of La Pallice in occupied France, arriving on 8 February.

=== Third patrol ===
The boat's third patrol began when she left La Pallice on 10 June 1942. Having crossed the Atlantic Ocean, she attacked shipping in the Gulf of St Lawrence as part of the Battle of the St. Lawrence.

On 6 July U-132 sank three ships from Convoy QS-15, Anastasios Pateras, Hainaut, and Dinaric, all southeast of Cap Chat, Quebec. The convoy escort, the Canadian minesweeper HMCS Drummondville, retaliated with a depth charge attack, which damaged the U-boat's ballast pumps and resulted in the loss of 4 m³ of fuel.

Fourteen days later, on 20 July, the submarine attacked Frederika Lensen in convoy QS-19 near Anticosti Island. The ship was towed to Grand Valée Bay and beached, but with her back broken, she was declared a total loss.

On 29 July the U-132 sightes convoy ON 113 and the next day sank one ship from it.

The boat returned to La Pallice on 16 August.

=== Fourth patrol and loss ===
U-132 left La Pallice for the last time on 6 October 1942. Operating southeast of Cape Farewell (Greenland), she sank Hobbema and Empire Lynx, but was sunk, probably by falling debris from the ammunition ship Hatimura when that vessel exploded following an attack by U-132 and U-442 on 4 November. All 47 crew members died.

=== Wolfpacks ===
U-132 took part in three wolfpacks, namely:

- Endrass (12 – 17 June 1942)
- Panther (13 – 19 October 1942)
- Veilchen (20 October - 3 November 1942)

=== Previously recorded fate ===
U-132 had originally been recorded as sunk the next day, 5 November 1942, by British aircraft of No. 120 Squadron RAF. The 120 Squadron attack, in the same area southeast of Cape Farewell where U-132 inadvertently sank herself, had actually been on U-89 operating nearby, causing severe damage but not sinking her.

== Summary of raiding history ==
Date	Ship Name	Nationality	Tonnage	Fate	Position	Deaths
18 October 1941	Argun	Soviet Union	3,487	Sunk	67°41′N 41°03′E	Unknown
18 October 1941	SKR-11 Ural	Soviet Navy	557	Sunk	67°33′N 41°08′E	40
29 January 1942	USCGC Alexander Hamilton	United States Coast Guard	2,216	Sunk	64°10′N 22°56′W	32
6 July 1942	Anastassios Pateras	Greece	3,382	Sunk	49°30′N 66°30′W	3
6 July 1942	Dinaric	United Kingdom	2,555	Sunk	49°30′N 66°30′W	4
6 July 1942	Hainaut	Belgium	4,312	Sunk	49°13′N 66°49′W	1
20 July 1942	Frederika Lensen	United Kingdom	4,367	Total loss	49°22′N 65°12′W	4
30 July 1942	Pacific Pioneer	United Kingdom	6,734	Sunk	43°30′N 60°35′W	0
4 November 1942	Empire Lynx	United Kingdom	6,379	Sunk	55°20′N 40°01′W	0
4 November 1942	Hatimura*	United Kingdom	6,690	Damaged	55°30′N 40°00′W	28
4 November 1942	Hobbema	Netherlands	5,507	Sunk	55°28′N 39°52′W	4

*Credit for sinking this vessel belongs to U-442

== Bibliography ==
- Busch, Rainer; Röll, Hans-Joachim (1999). German U-boat commanders of World War II : a biographical dictionary. Translated by Brooks, Geoffrey. London, Annapolis, Md: Greenhill Books, Naval Institute Press. ISBN 1-55750-186-6.
- Rohwer, J.; Hummelchen, G. (1992). Chronology of the War at Sea 1939–1945. Naval Institute Press. ISBN 1-55750-105-X.
- Busch, Rainer; Röll, Hans-Joachim (1999). Deutsche U-Boot-Verluste von September 1939 bis Mai 1945 [German U-boat losses from September 1939 to May 1945]. Der U-Boot-Krieg (in German). Vol. IV. Hamburg, Berlin, Bonn: Mittler. ISBN 3-8132-0514-2.
- Gröner, Erich; Jung, Dieter; Maass, Martin (1991). U-boats and Mine Warfare Vessels. German Warships 1815–1945. Vol. 2. Translated by Thomas, Keith; Magowan, Rachel. London: Conway Maritime Press. ISBN 0-85177-593-4.
