= Cytherea =

Cytherea refer to:

- Cytherea, or Aphrodite, a goddess in Greek mythology

== Arts and entertainment ==
- Cytherea (actress) (born 1981), an American pornographic film actress
- Cytherea (film), a 1924 lost silent film based on the Joseph Hergesheimer novel
- Cytherea, Goddess of Love, a 1922 novel by Joseph Hergesheimer

== Biology ==
- Cytherea (fly), a genus of bee flies (Bombyliidae)
- Cytherea chione, or Callista chione, the smooth clam
- Cytherea multistriata, or Notocallista multistriata, a marine bivalve mollusc
- Acropora cytherea, a species of coral
- Cytherea, a synonym for the orchid genus Calypso

== See also ==
- Cythera (disambiguation)
- "Cytherean", a term referring to Cythera or Venus
- Saizeriya
