= USS Cythera =

USS Cythera may refer to the following ships of the United States Navy:

- USS Cythera (PY-26), a patrol yacht launched on 20 September 1906 which served in World War I as USS Cythera (SP-575) and in World War II as USS Cythera (PY-26) until torpedoed and sunk by a German submarine in 1942.
- USS Cythera (PY-31), a patrol yacht that the Navy purchased on 14 July 1942 and placed out of service on 14 March 1946.
