= German submarine U-402 =

German World War II submarine

History

Nazi Germany
- Name: U-402
- Ordered: 23 September 1939
- Builder: Danziger Werft, Danzig
- Yard number: 103
- Laid down: 22 April 1940
- Launched: 28 December 1940
- Commissioned: 21 May 1941
- Fate: Sunk on 13 October 1943 by Mark 24 FIDO Torpedo from Grumman TBF Avenger aircraft of USS Card

General characteristics
- Class & type: Type VIIC submarine
- Displacement: 769 tonnes (757 long tons) surfaced; 871 t (857 long tons) submerged
- Length: 67.10 m (220 ft 2 in) o/a; 50.50 m (165 ft 8 in) pressure hull
- Beam: 6.20 m (20 ft 4 in) o/a; 4.70 m (15 ft 5 in) pressure hull
- Height: 9.60 m (31 ft 6 in)
- Draught: 4.74 m (15 ft 7 in)
- Installed power: 2,800–3,200 PS (2,100–2,400 kW; 2,800–3,200 bhp) (diesels); 750 PS (550 kW; 740 shp) (electric)
- Propulsion: 2 shafts; 2 × diesel engines; 2 × electric motors
- Speed: 17.7 knots (32.8 km/h; 20.4 mph) surfaced; 7.6 knots (14.1 km/h; 8.7 mph) submerged
- Range: 8,500 nmi (15,700 km; 9,800 mi) at 10 knots (19 km/h; 12 mph) surfaced; 80 nmi (150 km; 92 mi) at 4 knots (7.4 km/h; 4.6 mph) submerged
- Test depth: 230 m (750 ft); Crush depth: 250–295 m (820–968 ft)
- Complement: 4 officers, 40–56 enlisted
- Armament: 5 × 53.3 cm (21 in) torpedo tubes (four bow, one stern); 14 × torpedoes or 26 TMA mines; 1 × 8.8 cm (3.46 in) deck gun (220 rounds); 1 x 2 cm (0.79 in) C/30 AA gun

Service record
- Part of: 3rd U-boat Flotilla; 21 May 1941 – 13 October 1943
- Identification codes: M 43 571
- Commanders: K.Kapt. Siegfried Freiherr von Forstner; 21 May 1941 – 13 October 1943
- Operations: 8 patrols: 1st patrol: 26 October – 9 December 1941; 2nd patrol: 11 January – 11 February 1942; 3rd patrol: 26 March – 20 May 1942; 4th patrol: 16 June – 5 August 1942; 5th patrol: 4 October – 20 November 1942; 6th patrol: 14 January – 23 February 1943; 7th patrol: 21 April – 26 May 1943; 8th patrol: 4 September – 13 October 1943
- Victories: 14 merchant ships sunk (70,434 GRT); 1 auxiliary warship sunk (602 GRT); 3 merchant ships damaged (28,682 GRT)

German submarine U-402 was a Type VIIC U-boat built for Nazi Germany's Kriegsmarine for service during World War II.

She was laid down at the Danziger Werft in the city of the same name on 22 April 1940 as yard number 103, launched on 28 December 1940 and was commissioned on 21 May 1941, with Kapitänleutnant Siegfried Freiherr von Forstner in command.

The boat commenced her career with the 3rd U-boat Flotilla on 21 May 1941 carrying out training before moving on to operations on 1 October 1941. U-402 carried out eight combat patrols, sinking 14 merchantmen and one auxiliary warship for a total of 71,036 gross register tons (GRT) during the Second World War. She also damaged three other ships. The submarine was a member of twelve wolfpacks.

For his numerous successes, von Forstner received the Knight's Cross.

== Design ==
German Type VIIC submarines were preceded by the shorter Type VIIB submarines. U-402 had a displacement of 769 tonnes (757 long tons) when at the surface and 871 tonnes (857 long tons) while submerged. She had a total length of 67.10 m (220 ft 2 in), a pressure hull length of 50.50 m (165 ft 8 in), a beam of 6.20 m (20 ft 4 in), a height of 9.60 m (31 ft 6 in), and a draught of 4.74 m (15 ft 7 in). The submarine was powered by two Germaniawerft F46 four-stroke, six-cylinder supercharged diesel engines producing a total of 2,800 to 3,200 metric horsepower (2,060 to 2,350 kW; 2,760 to 3,160 shp) for use while surfaced, two Siemens-Schuckert GU 343/38–8 double-acting electric motors producing a total of 750 metric horsepower (550 kW; 740 shp) for use while submerged. She had two shafts and two 1.23 m (4 ft) propellers. The boat was capable of operating at depths of up to 230 metres (750 ft).

The submarine had a maximum surface speed of 17.7 knots (32.8 km/h; 20.4 mph) and a maximum submerged speed of 7.6 knots (14.1 km/h; 8.7 mph). When submerged, the boat could operate for 80 nautical miles (150 km; 92 mi) at 4 knots (7.4 km/h; 4.6 mph); when surfaced, she could travel 8,500 nautical miles (15,700 km; 9,800 mi) at 10 knots (19 km/h; 12 mph). U-402 was fitted with five 53.3 cm (21 in) torpedo tubes (four fitted at the bow and one at the stern), fourteen torpedoes, one 8.8 cm (3.46 in) SK C/35 naval gun, 220 rounds, and a 2 cm (0.79 in) C/30 anti-aircraft gun. The boat had a complement of between forty-four and sixty.

== Service history ==
=== First and second patrols ===
No ships were sunk during the first patrol which lasted from 26 October to 9 December 1941. U-402 followed the Norwegian coast from Kiel before heading west towards the Atlantic. The submarine sailed into St. Nazaire in France, after 45 uneventful days.

On her second patrol, U-402 damaged the 11,951 GRT troopship Llangibby Castle off the Bay of Biscay on 16 January 1942, but the troopship was able to make repairs in the Azores. U-402 returned to St. Nazaire on 11 February 1942.

=== Third and fourth patrols ===
For her third sortie, U-402 headed for the US east coast, sinking a total of three ships, two of which were the 5,284 GRT Soviet freighter Ashkhabad and her escort, the 602 GRT converted yacht USS Cythera off Cape Hatteras on 2 May 1942. The U-boat had been unsuccessfully attacked by a US Navy PBY Catalina in mid-Atlantic on 29 April 1942.

The boat returned to the US eastern seaboard for her fourth patrol, but success eluded her. She returned to France, having been depth charged by patrol bombers off Cape Hatteras in mid-July and suffering a battery explosion. U-402 limped back to France, but this time to La Pallice, on 5 August 1942.

=== Fifth and sixth patrols ===
It was a different story on her fifth patrol; the boat attacked over 20,000 GRT of shipping, including the torpedoing of five ships from convoy SC 107 which involved the sinking of the British 4,945 GRT Empire Antelope on 2 November 1942 and a sister, Empire Sunrise, a few hours earlier.

She also had plenty of success when she attacked seven ships from convoy SC 118 on her sixth patrol. including the USS Henry R. Mallory.

=== Seventh and eighth patrols ===
Her seventh outing saw her sinking two ships from convoy SC 129. Retribution was swift; one of the escorts, HMS Gentian depth charged the boat causing severe damage, which included a tear 3 metres long in a ballast tank, which forced it to return to La Pallice on 26 May.

Her eighth and final patrol was marked with a paucity of targets and an ever-increasing frequency of air attacks; one of which involved a Wellington of 612 Squadron, RAF on 8 September. U-402 was not hit. The aircraft was damaged and reached RAF Portreath on one engine.

=== Loss ===
U-402 had departed La Pallice on 4 September 1943. On the 13 October she was sunk by a Mark 24 FIDO Torpedo dropped by Grumman TBF Avenger aircraft from the escort carrier USS Card.

=== Wolfpacks ===
U-402 took part in twelve wolfpacks, namely:

- Störtebecker (17 – 19 November 1941)
- Benecke (19 – 25 November 1941)
- Letzte Ritter (25 November – 4 December 1941)
- Panther (10 – 20 October 1942)
- Veilchen (20 October – 5 November 1942)
- Landsknecht (19 – 28 January 1943)
- Pfeil (1 – 8 February 1943)
- Amsel 1 (3 – 6 May 1943)
- Elbe (7 – 10 May 1943)
- Elbe 2 (10 – 12 May 1943)
- Leuthen (15 – 24 September 1943)
- Rossbach (24 September – 6 October 1943)

== Summary of raiding history ==
Date	Ship Name	Nationality	Tonnage (Note: Merchant ship tonnages are in gross register tons. Military vessels are listed by tons displacement.)	Fate
16 May 1941	Llangibby Castle	United Kingdom	11,951	Damaged
13 April 1942	Empire Progress	United Kingdom	5,249	Sunk
30 April 1942	Ashkhabad	Soviet Union	5,284	Sunk
2 May 1942	USS Cythera	United States Navy	602	Sunk
2 November 1942	Dalcroy	United Kingdom	4,558	Sunk
2 November 1942	Empire Antelope	United Kingdom	4,945	Sunk
2 November 1942	Empire Leopard	United Kingdom	5,676	Sunk
2 November 1942	Empire Sunrise	United Kingdom	7,459	Damaged
2 November 1942	Rinos	Greece	4,649	Sunk
7 February 1943	Afrika	United Kingdom	8,597	Sunk
7 February 1943	Daghild	Norway	9,272	Damaged
7 February 1943	USS Henry R. Mallory	United States Navy	6,063	Sunk
7 February 1943	Kalliopi	Greece	4,965	Sunk
7 February 1943	Robert E. Hopkins	United States	6,625	Sunk
7 February 1943	Toward	United Kingdom	1,571	Sunk
8 February 1943	Newton Ash	United Kingdom	4,625	Sunk
11 May 1943	Antigone	United Kingdom	4,545	Sunk
11 May 1943	Grado	Norway	3,082	Sunk

== Bibliography ==
- Blair, Clay (1996). Hitler's U-Boat War – The Hunted 1942–1945. New York: Random House. ISBN 0-394-58839-8.
- Blair, Clay (1998). Hitler's U-Boat War – The Hunted 1942–1945. New York: Random House. ISBN 0-679-45742-9.
- Busch, Rainer; Röll, Hans-Joachim (1999). German U-boat commanders of World War II: a biographical dictionary. Translated by Brooks, Geoffrey. London, Annapolis, MD: Greenhill Books, Naval Institute Press. ISBN 1-55750-186-6.
- Busch, Rainer; Röll, Hans-Joachim (1999). Deutsche U-Boot-Verluste von September 1939 bis Mai 1945 [German U-boat losses from September 1939 to May 1945]. Der U-Boot-Krieg (in German). Vol. IV. Hamburg, Berlin, Bonn: Mittler. ISBN 3-8132-0514-2.
- Edwards, Bernard (1996). Dönitz and the Wolf Packs – The U-boats at War. Cassell Military Classics. pp. 144, 147, 149, 206, 211. ISBN 0-304-35203-9.
- Gröner, Erich; Jung, Dieter; Maass, Martin (1991). U-boats and Mine Warfare Vessels. German Warships 1815–1945. Vol. 2. Translated by Thomas, Keith; Magowan, Rachel. London: Conway Maritime Press. ISBN 0-85177-593-4.
- Hague, Arnold (2000). The Allied Convoy System 1939–1945. Annapolis, MD: Naval Institute Press. ISBN 1-55750-019-3.
- Kemp, Paul (1999). U-Boats Destroyed – German Submarine Losses in the World Wars. London: Arms & Armour. ISBN 1-85409-515-3.
- Lenton, HT (1976). German Warships of the Second World War. Arco Publishing Company. ISBN 0-668-04037-8.
- Waters, John M Jr (December 1966). "Stay Tough". Proceedings. United States Naval Institute.
