= Wolfpack Veilchen =

- Active: 20 October 1942 - 7 November 1942
- Country: Nazi Germany
- Branch: Kriegsmarine
- Size: 13 submarines
- Engagements: Convoy SC 107

Commanders
- Notable commanders: Siegfried von Forstner; Helmut Möhlmann

Veilchen (Violet) was a wolfpack of German U-boats that operated during the World War II Battle of the Atlantic from 20 October 1942 to 7 November 1942.

== Service ==
The group was responsible for sinking eight merchant ships 43,935 gross register tons (GRT) and damaging a further two merchant ships 12,955 gross register tons (GRT).

=== Raiding History ===
Date	U-boat	Name of ship	Nationality	Tons	Convoy	Fate
2 November 1942	U-402	Dalcroy	United Kingdom	4,558	SC 107	Sunk
2 November 1942	U-402	Empire Antelope	United Kingdom	4,945	SC 107	Sunk
2 November 1942	U-402	Empire Leopard	United Kingdom	5,676	SC 107	Sunk
2 November 1942	U-402	Empire Sunrise	United Kingdom	7,459	SC 107	Damaged
2 November 1942	U-84	Empire Sunrise	United Kingdom	7,459	SC 107	Sunk
2 November 1942	U-438	Hartington	United Kingdom	5,496	SC 107	Damaged
2 November 1942	U-402	Rinos	Greece	4,649	SC 107	Sunk
3 November 1942	U-89	Jeypore	United Kingdom	5,318	SC 107	Sunk
4 November 1942	U-89	Daleby	United Kingdom	4,640	SC 107	Sunk
4 November 1942	U-442	Hatimura	United Kingdom	6,690	SC 107	Sunk
Total:				56,890		

=== U-boats ===
U-boat	Commander	From	To
U-71	Hardo Rodler von Roithberg	20 October 1942	7 November 1942
U-84	Horst Uphoff	20 October 1942	5 November 1942
U-89	Dietrich Lohmann	20 October 1942	5 November 1942
U-132	Ernst Vogelsang	20 October 1942	3 November 1942
U-381	Wilhelm-Heinrich Graf Pückler und Limpurg	20 October 1942	5 November 1942
U-402	Siegfried von Forstner	20 October 1942	5 November 1942
U-437	Werner-Karl Schulz	27 October 1942	4 November 1942
U-438	Rudolf Franzius	20 October 1942	5 November 1942
U-442	Hans-Joachim Hesse	27 October 1942	4 November 1942
U-454	Burckhard Hackländer	20 October 1942	7 November 1942
U-571	Helmut Möhlmann	20 October 1942	7 November 1942
U-658	Hans Senkel	20 October 1942	30 October 1942
U-704	Horst Wilhelm Kessler	20 October 1942	7 November 1942

== Bibliography ==
- Edwards, Bernard (1996). Dönitz and the Wolf Packs - The U-boats at War. Cassell Military Classics. p. 144. ISBN 0-304-35203-9.
