= SS Empire Antelope =

Cargo ship sunk during World War II

History
- Name: Ophis (1919-28); Bangu (1928–41); Empire Antelope (1941–42)
- Owner: United States Shipping Board (1919-37); United States Maritime Corporation (1937–41); Ministry of War Transport (1941–42)
- Operator: Owner operated except:-; Moss Hutchinson Line Ltd (1941–42)
- Port of registry: (United States) Tacoma (1919–37); (United States) New York (1937–41); (United Kingdom) London (1941–42)
- Builder: Todd Dry Dock and Construction Company, Tacoma, Washington
- Yard number: 9
- Launched: 30 July 1919
- Completed: 5 August 1919
- In service: 30 September 1919
- Identification: US official Number 219009 (1919-41); Code letters LTDP (1919–41); UK Official Number 168205 (1941–42); Code letters BCGT (1941–42)
- Fate: Sunk 2 November 1942

General characteristics
- Tonnage: 4,782 GRT
- Length: 380 ft 5 in (115.95 m)
- Beam: 53 ft 1 in (16.18 m)
- Depth: 27 ft (8.23 m)
- Propulsion: 1 x triple expansion steam engine (Todd Dry Dock & Construction Co, Tacoma) 339 hp (253 kW)
- Speed: 10 knots (19 km/h)
- Complement: 42 crew (plus 8 DEMS gunners)

Location of the sinking of Empire Antelope

Empire Antelope was a 4,782-ton cargo ship which was built as Ophis in 1919. She was renamed Bangu in 1928. In 1941 she was renamed Empire Antelope. She was sunk by the German submarine U-402 on 2 November 1942.

== History ==
Ophis was built by Todd Dry Dock and Construction Company, Tacoma as yard number 9. She was allocated United States Shipping Board hull number 2630. She was launched on 30 July 1919 and completed on 5 August 1919. Delivery was on 30 September 1919. Ophis was powered by a triple expansion steam engine and could make 10 knots.

She was owned by the United States Shipping Board. In March 1920, Maritime Salvors Ltd, London reported that they had been involved in the salvage of Ophis. On 29 November 1920, Ophis came to the rescue of the Norwegian 3-masted barque Hebe, which had been dismasted off the Azores, Portugal. Hebe was towed in to Fayal. In 1928, she was renamed Bangu On 26 January 1931, she lost her propeller 200 nautical miles (370 km) south of Bahía Blanca, Argentina. She was passed to the United States Maritime Commission in 1937, and laid up as part of the reserve fleet. In 1941, Bangu passed to the Ministry of War Transport and was renamed Empire Antelope.

=== War Service ===
Empire Antelope was a member of a number of convoys during World War II.

ON 37

Convoy ON 37 sailed from Liverpool on 15 November 1941 and dispersed during the night of November 23/34. Empire Antelope sailed from Aultbea.

SC 77

Convoy SC 77 departed Halifax, Nova Scotia on 30 March 1942 and arrived at Liverpool on 16 April. Empire Antelope was carrying a cargo of steel and other general cargo, destined for Garston.

SC 94

Convoy SC 94 departed Sydney, Nova Scotia on 31 July 1942. Five ships from the convoy were torpedoed by simultaneous attacks of U-176 and U-379 at 13:25Z on 8 August. Detonations of the five sinking ships caused hasty abandonment of three additional ships (including Empire Antelope) whose crews believed they had been torpedoed. Empire Antelope's crewmen reboarded their slightly damaged ship and arrived at Liverpool on 13 August.

SC 107

Empire Antelope departed New York City on 24 October 1942 with 5,560 tons of general cargo as a member of Convoy SC 107. At 08:04 hrs (CET) on 2 November 1942, the German submarine U-402, captained by Baron Siegfried von Forstner, fired torpedoed and sank Empire Antelope at 52°26′N 45°22′W. All fifty crew members were saved by the convoy rescue ship SS Stockport and landed at Reykjavík, Iceland, on 8 November 1942.

== Official number and code letters ==
Official Numbers were a forerunner to IMO Numbers.

Bangu used the US Official Number 219009 and the Code Letters LTDP. Empire Antelope used the UK Official Number 168205 and the Code Letters BCGT.
