= Cythera (ancient town) =

Ancient town on Kythira island, Greece

Coordinates: 36°13′46″N 23°01′45″E

Cythera or Kythera (Ancient Greek: Κύθηρα) was the name of a town on the island of the same name. In antiquity it was part of Laconia.

== History ==
In 424 BCE, during the Peloponnesian War, the Athenians made an expedition against the island of Cythera, with sixty ships. When they reached the island they first took Scandeia and then they went against Cythera town, which was then far from the sea. Its inhabitants resisted a time but then they agreed to submit to the Athenians, who afterwards established a garrison there. Some inhabitants of Cythera were moved for security reasons and the rest of the inhabitants had to pay a tribute of four talents. In the Peace of Nicias of the year 421 BCE it was stipulated that the Athenians should return Cythera to the Spartans; however, in the expedition to Sicily year 415 BCE, the Cythereans fought beside the Athenians.

In the year 393 BCE, an expedition under the command of Pharnabazus II occupied Cythera and its inhabitants were sent to Laconia. Pharnabazus had the walls repaired and left a garrison under the command of the Athenian Nicophemus.

In Strabo's time, Cythera was occupied as private property by the Spartan Gaius Julius Eurycles.

Pausanias located the city of Cythera at ten stadia from Scandeia and mentions that the townsfolk worshiped Aphrodite Urania and that the origin of this cult was Phoenician.

Its site is located at Paleokastro.
