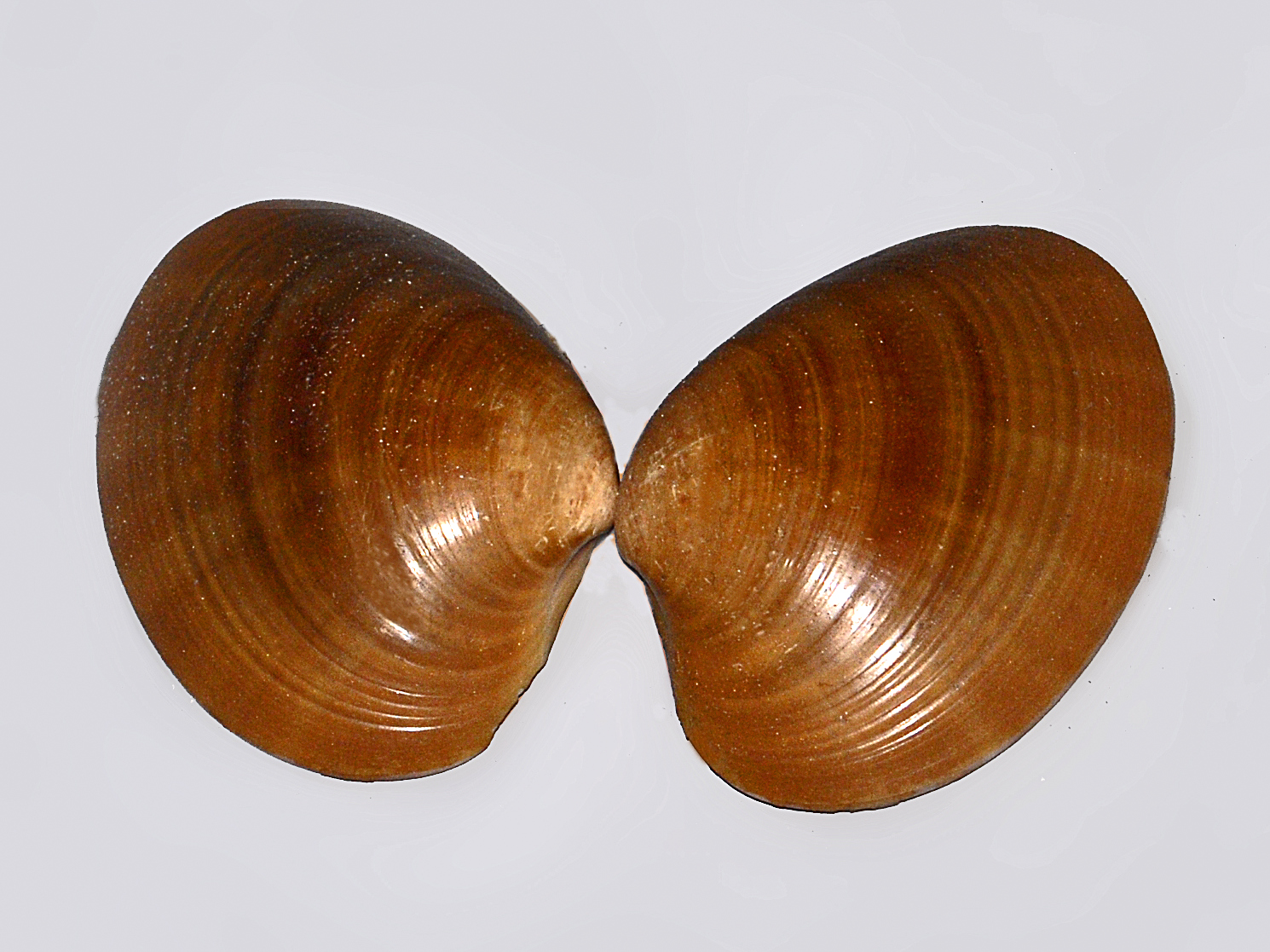
- A shell of Callista chione

Scientific classification
- Kingdom: Animalia
- Phylum: Mollusca
- Class: Bivalvia
- Order: Venerida
- Family: Veneridae
- Genus: Callista; Poli, 1791

Species
- See text

= Callista (bivalve) =

Genus of bivalves

Callista is a genus of saltwater clams, marine, bivalve molluscs in the family Veneridae, the venus clams.

== Species ==
Species within the genus Callista include:

- Callista bardwelli Clench & Mclean, 1936
- Callista brevisiphonata Carpenter, 1865
- Callista chinensis Holten, 1802
- Callista chione (Linnaeus, 1758)
- Callista costata Dillwyn, 1817
- Callista erycina Linnaeus, 1758
- Callista eucymata Dall, 1890
- Callista florida Lamarck, 1818
- Callista grata Deshayes, 1853
- Callista impar Lamarck, 1818
- Callista maculata (Linnaeus, 1758)
- Callista multiradiata Sowerby, 1851
- Callista phasianella Deshayes, 1854
- Callista pilsbryi Habe, 1960
- Callista planatella Lamarck, 1818
- Callista politissima Kuroda, 1945
- Callista roscida Gould, 1861
- Callista semisulcata Sowerby, 1851
- Callista squalida Sowerby, 1835

Extinct species

- †Callista elegans Lamarck 1806 - Age range: 48.6 to 40.4 Ma, found only at Falunière de Grignon (Eocene of France)
