= German submarine U-89 (1941) =

German World War II submarine

History

Nazi Germany
- Name: U-89
- Ordered: 25 January 1939
- Builder: Flender Werke, Lübeck
- Yard number: 293
- Laid down: 20 August 1940
- Launched: 20 September 1941
- Commissioned: 19 November 1941
- Fate: Sunk 12 May 1943

General characteristics
- Class & type: Type VIIC submarine
- Displacement: 769 tonnes (757 long tons) surfaced; 871 t (857 long tons) submerged
- Length: 67.10 m (220 ft 2 in) o/a; 50.50 m (165 ft 8 in) pressure hull
- Beam: 6.20 m (20 ft 4 in) o/a; 4.70 m (15 ft 5 in) pressure hull
- Height: 9.60 m (31 ft 6 in)
- Draught: 4.74 m (15 ft 7 in)
- Installed power: 2,800–3,200 PS (2,100–2,400 kW; 2,800–3,200 bhp) (diesels); 750 PS (550 kW; 740 shp) (electric)
- Propulsion: 2 shafts; 2 × diesel engines; 2 × electric motors
- Speed: 17.7 knots (32.8 km/h; 20.4 mph) surfaced; 7.6 knots (14.1 km/h; 8.7 mph) submerged
- Range: 8,500 nmi (15,700 km; 9,800 mi) at 10 knots (19 km/h; 12 mph) surfaced; 80 nmi (150 km; 92 mi) at 4 knots (7.4 km/h; 4.6 mph) submerged
- Test depth: 230 m (750 ft); Crush depth: 250–295 m (820–968 ft)
- Complement: 4 officers, 40–56 enlisted
- Armament: 5 × 53.3 cm (21 in) torpedo tubes (four bow, one stern); 14 × torpedoes; 1 × 8.8 cm (3.46 in) deck gun (220 rounds); 1 x 2 cm (0.79 in) C/30 AA gun

Service record
- Part of: 8th U-boat Flotilla; 19 November 1941 – 30 April 1942; 9th U-boat Flotilla; 1 May 1942 – 12 May 1943
- Identification codes: M 41 005
- Commanders: Kptlt. / K.Kapt. Dietrich Lohmann; 19 November 1941 – 12 May 1943
- Operations: 5 patrols: 1st patrol: 14 – 27 May 1942; 2nd patrol: 6 June – 21 August 1942; 3rd patrol: 4 October – 19 November 1942; 4th patrol: 24 January – 28 March 1943; 5th patrol: 25 April – 12 May 1943
- Victories: 4 merchant ships sunk (13,815 GRT)

German submarine U-89 was a Type VIIC U-boat of Nazi Germany's Kriegsmarine during World War II.

She was laid down at the Flender Werke in Lübeck as yard number 293, launched on 20 September 1941 and commissioned on 19 November with Kapitänleutnant Dietrich Lohmann in command.

She was a fairly successful boat, sinking over 13,815 GRT of Allied shipping in a career lasting just one year and five patrols. She was a member of ten wolfpacks. After training with the 8th U-boat Flotilla, U-89 was assigned to the 9th flotilla on 1 May 1942 for operations.

== Design ==
German Type VIIC submarines were preceded by the shorter Type VIIB submarines. U-89 had a displacement of 769 tonnes (757 long tons) when at the surface and 871 tonnes (857 long tons) while submerged. She had a total length of 67.10 m (220 ft 2 in), a pressure hull length of 50.50 m (165 ft 8 in), a beam of 6.20 m (20 ft 4 in), a height of 9.60 m (31 ft 6 in), and a draught of 4.74 m (15 ft 7 in). The submarine was powered by two Germaniawerft F46 four-stroke, six-cylinder supercharged diesel engines producing a total of 2,800 to 3,200 metric horsepower (2,060 to 2,350 kW; 2,760 to 3,160 shp) for use while surfaced, two AEG GU 460/8–27 double-acting electric motors producing a total of 750 metric horsepower (550 kW; 740 shp) for use while submerged. She had two shafts and two 1.23 m (4 ft) propellers. The boat was capable of operating at depths of up to 230 metres (750 ft).

The submarine had a maximum surface speed of 17.7 knots (32.8 km/h; 20.4 mph) and a maximum submerged speed of 7.6 knots (14.1 km/h; 8.7 mph). When submerged, the boat could operate for 80 nautical miles (150 km; 92 mi) at 4 knots (7.4 km/h; 4.6 mph); when surfaced, she could travel 8,500 nautical miles (15,700 km; 9,800 mi) at 10 knots (19 km/h; 12 mph). U-89 was fitted with five 53.3 cm (21 in) torpedo tubes (four fitted at the bow and one at the stern), fourteen torpedoes, one 8.8 cm (3.46 in) SK C/35 naval gun, 220 rounds, and a 2 cm (0.79 in) C/30 anti-aircraft gun. The boat had a complement of between forty-four and sixty.

== Service history ==
=== First patrol ===
U-89 departed Kiel for her first patrol on 14 May 1942. She docked in Brest, on the French Atlantic coast, on the 27th.

=== Second patrol ===
The boat's second foray started from Brest on 6 June 1942 and finishing there on 21 August. Using her deck gun she sank a Canadian fishing boat, the Lucille M., with 20 incendiary and 15 high explosive rounds off Cape Sable on 25 July

=== Third patrol ===
U-89 sank the British ship, the Jeypore on 3 November 1942 and the Daleby also British, both east of Cape Farewell (Greenland), the following day. On the fifth, she was attacked by a B-24 Liberator of No. 120 Squadron RAF. Originally thought to have sunk U-132, U-89 was severely damaged.

=== Fourth patrol ===
Sortie number four began from Brest on 24 January 1943; it was relatively uneventful but terminated in La Pallice on 28 March.

=== Fifth patrol and loss ===
U-89 left France for the last time on 25 April 1943. On 7 May she sank the Greek Laconikis northeast of the Azores but was herself sunk by a combination of a Fairey Swordfish of 811 Naval Air Squadron from the escort carrier HMS Biter, the destroyer HMS Broadway and the frigate HMS Lagan. U-89 was sunk at position 46°30′N 25°40′W.

48 men died with the U-boat; there were no survivors.

=== Wolfpacks ===
U-89 took part in ten wolfpacks, namely:

- Endrass (12 – 17 June 1942)
- Tümmler (4 – 7 October 1942)
- Panther (10 – 20 October 1942)
- Veilchen (20 October – 5 November 1942)
- Pfeil (1 – 9 February 1943)
- Neptun (20 – 28 February 1943)
- Wildfang (28 February – 5 March 1943)
- Burggraf (5 March 1943)
- Raubgraf (7 – 15 March 1943)
- Drossel (29 April – 12 May 1943)

== Summary of raiding history ==
Date	Ship	Nationality	Tonnage	Fate
25 July 1942	Lucille M	Canada	54	Sunk
3 November 1942	Jeypore	United Kingdom	5,318	Sunk
4 November 1942	Daleby	United Kingdom	4,640	Sunk
7 May 1943	Laconikos	Greece	3,803	Sunk

== Bibliography ==
- Busch, Rainer; Röll, Hans-Joachim (1999). German U-boat commanders of World War II : a biographical dictionary. Translated by Brooks, Geoffrey. London, Annapolis, Md: Greenhill Books, Naval Institute Press. ISBN 1-55750-186-6.
- Busch, Rainer; Röll, Hans-Joachim (1999). Der U-Boot-Krieg, 1939-1945: Deutsche U-Boot-Verluste von September 1939 bis Mai 1945 [German U-boat losses from September 1939 to May 1945] (in German). Vol. IV. Hamburg, Berlin, Bonn: Mittler. ISBN 3-8132-0514-2.
- Edwards, Bernard (1996). Dönitz and the Wolf Packs - The U-boats at War. Cassell. pp. 210–211. ISBN 0-304-35203-9.
- Gröner, Eric; Jung, Dieter; Maass, Martin (1991). German Warships 1815-1945: U-boats and Mine Warfare Vessels. Vol. 2. Translated by Thomas, Keith; Magowan, Rachel. London: Conway Maritime Press. ISBN 0-85177-593-4.
- Kemp, Paul (1999). U-Boats Destroyed - German Submarine Losses in the World Wars. London: Arms & Armour. ISBN 1-85409-515-3.
