= German submarine U-520 =

German World War II submarine

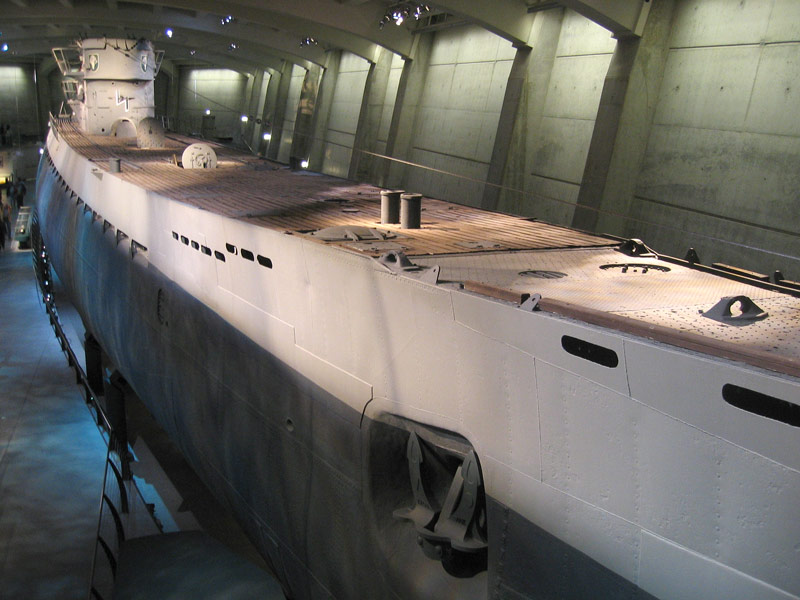
- U-505, a typical Type IXC boat

History

Nazi Germany
- Name: U-520
- Ordered: 14 February 1940
- Builder: Deutsche Werft, Hamburg
- Yard number: 335
- Laid down: 1 July 1941
- Launched: 2 March 1942
- Commissioned: 19 May 1942
- Fate: Sunk on 30 October 1942

General characteristics
- Class & type: Type IXC submarine
- Displacement: 1,120 t (1,100 long tons) surfaced; 1,232 t (1,213 long tons) submerged
- Length: 76.76 m (251 ft 10 in) o/a; 58.75 m (192 ft 9 in) pressure hull
- Beam: 6.76 m (22 ft 2 in) o/a; 4.40 m (14 ft 5 in) pressure hull
- Height: 9.60 m (31 ft 6 in)
- Draught: 4.70 m (15 ft 5 in)
- Installed power: 4,400 PS (3,200 kW; 4,300 bhp) (diesels); 1,000 PS (740 kW; 990 shp) (electric)
- Propulsion: 2 shafts; 2 × diesel engines; 2 × electric motors
- Speed: 18.3 knots (33.9 km/h; 21.1 mph) surfaced; 7.3 knots (13.5 km/h; 8.4 mph) submerged
- Range: 13,450 nmi (24,910 km; 15,480 mi) at 10 knots (19 km/h; 12 mph) surfaced; 64 nmi (119 km; 74 mi) at 4 knots (7.4 km/h; 4.6 mph) submerged
- Test depth: 230 m (750 ft)
- Complement: 4 officers, 44 enlisted
- Armament: 6 × torpedo tubes (4 bow, 2 stern); 22 × 53.3 cm (21 in) torpedoes; 1 × 10.5 cm (4.1 in) SK C/32 deck gun (180 rounds); 1 × 3.7 cm (1.5 in) SK C/30 AA gun; 1 × 2 cm FlaK 38 AA guns

Service record
- Part of: 4th U-boat Flotilla; 19 May – 30 September 1942; 2nd U-boat Flotilla; 1 – 30 October 1942
- Identification codes: M 46 364
- Commanders: Kptlt. Volkmar Schwartzkopff; 19 May – 30 October 1942
- Operations: 1 patrol: 3 – 30 October 1942
- Victories: None

German submarine U-520 was a Type IXC U-boat of Nazi Germany's Kriegsmarine during World War II. The U-boat was laid down on 1 July 1941 at the Deutsche Werft yard in Hamburg as yard number 335, launched on 2 March 1942 and commissioned on 19 May 1942 under the command of Kapitänleutnant Volkmar Schwartzkopff. After training with the 4th U-boat Flotilla, she was transferred to the 2nd flotilla for front-line service on 1 October 1942. She was sunk on 30 October 1942 off Newfoundland.

== Design ==
German Type IXC submarines were slightly larger than the original Type IXBs. U-520 had a displacement of 1,120 tonnes (1,100 long tons) when at the surface and 1,232 tonnes (1,213 long tons) while submerged. The U-boat had a total length of 76.76 m (251 ft 10 in), a pressure hull length of 58.75 m (192 ft 9 in), a beam of 6.76 m (22 ft 2 in), a height of 9.60 m (31 ft 6 in), and a draught of 4.70 m (15 ft 5 in). The submarine was powered by two MAN M 9 V 40/46 supercharged four-stroke, nine-cylinder diesel engines producing a total of 4,400 metric horsepower (3,240 kW; 4,340 shp) for use while surfaced, two Siemens-Schuckert 2 GU 345/34 double-acting electric motors producing a total of 1,000 shaft horsepower (1,010 PS; 750 kW) for use while submerged. She had two shafts and two 1.92 m (6 ft) propellers. The boat was capable of operating at depths of up to 230 metres (750 ft).

The submarine had a maximum surface speed of 18.3 knots (33.9 km/h; 21.1 mph) and a maximum submerged speed of 7.3 knots (13.5 km/h; 8.4 mph). When submerged, the boat could operate for 63 nautical miles (117 km; 72 mi) at 4 knots (7.4 km/h; 4.6 mph); when surfaced, she could travel 13,450 nautical miles (24,910 km; 15,480 mi) at 10 knots (19 km/h; 12 mph). U-520 was fitted with six 53.3 cm (21 in) torpedo tubes (four fitted at the bow and two at the stern), 22 torpedoes, one 10.5 cm (4.13 in) SK C/32 naval gun, 180 rounds, and a 3.7 cm (1.5 in) SK C/30 as well as a 2 cm (0.79 in) C/30 anti-aircraft gun. The boat had a complement of forty-eight.

== Service history ==
U-520 sailed from Kiel on 3 October 1942, negotiated the gap between the Faeroe and Shetland Islands and then turned west toward Cape Farewell, (the southern tip of Greenland). After a brief journey in the direction of Iceland, she headed southwest, then south, before being sunk east of Newfoundland in position 47°47′N 49°50′W by depth charges from a Canadian Douglas Digby light bomber of No. 10 Squadron RCAF on 30 October 1942. None of her 53 crew members survived the sinking.

In January 2006 an article in the Edmonton Journal reported that a team of divers planned to search for U-520 and another U-boat, U-190.

== Bibliography ==
- Busch, Rainer; Röll, Hans-Joachim (1999). German U-boat commanders of World War II : a biographical dictionary. Translated by Brooks, Geoffrey. London, Annapolis, Md: Greenhill Books, Naval Institute Press. ISBN 1-55750-186-6.
- Busch, Rainer; Röll, Hans-Joachim (1999). Deutsche U-Boot-Verluste von September 1939 bis Mai 1945 [German U-boat losses from September 1939 to May 1945]. Der U-Boot-Krieg (in German). Vol. IV. Hamburg, Berlin, Bonn: Mittler. ISBN 3-8132-0514-2.
- Gröner, Erich; Jung, Dieter; Maass, Martin (1991). U-boats and Mine Warfare Vessels. German Warships 1815–1945. Vol. 2. Translated by Thomas, Keith; Magowan, Rachel. London: Conway Maritime Press. ISBN 0-85177-593-4.
- Kemp, Paul (1999). U-Boats Destroyed – German Submarine Losses in the World Wars. London: Arms & Armour. ISBN 1-85409-515-3.
