= USS Uncas (YT-242) =

United States Navy tugboat in commission from 1942 to 1946

History

United States
- Name: USS Uncas
- Namesake: Uncas (ca. 1588-ca. 1683), a Mohegan chief
- Builder: Levingston Shipbuilding Company, Orange, Texas
- Acquired: 21 March 1942
- Decommissioned: March 1946
- Stricken: January 1947
- Honors and awards: One battle star for World War II service
- Fate: Sold 16 May 1947; returned to commercial service
- Notes: In commercial service as Susan Moran and Southwind prior to 1942

General characteristics
- Type: Tug
- Length: 100 ft (30 m)
- Beam: 25 ft (7.6 m)
- Draft: 10 ft (3.0 m) (mean)
- Speed: 12 knots

The fourth USS Uncas (YT-242) was United States Navy tug in commission from 1942 to 1946.

== Career ==
=== World War II ===
Uncas was built by the Levingston Shipbuilding Company at Orange, Texas. She was in civilian service under the names Susan Moran and Southwind before the U.S. Navy acquired her on 21 March 1942 for use during World War II as USS Uncas (YT-242). She was named for Uncas, a chief of the Mohegan tribe in Connecticut during the 17th Century.

Uncas operated actively as part of the Service Force, United States Atlantic Fleet, for the duration of the war.

Her most memorable service came in early November 1942, when she helped to defend Convoy SC 107 against German submarines as it crossed the North Atlantic Ocean from Halifax, Nova Scotia, Canada, to the United Kingdom. She was awarded a battle star for this service.

=== Postwar career ===
Uncas was placed in an inactive status at Boston, Massachusetts, in March 1946. She was stricken from the Navy List in January 1947 and sold to private ownership on 16 May 1947.

== Awards ==
- American Campaign Medal with one battle star
- European-African-Middle Eastern Campaign Medal
- World War II Victory Medal
