= Scandeia =

Coordinates: 36°13′18″N 23°03′28″E

Scandeia or Skandeia (Ancient Greek: Σκάνδεια) was a town on the island of Cythera, at times considered part of ancient Laconia. Scandeia was located on the coast and is mentioned by Homer in the Iliad. Thucydides, in his account of the conquest of Cythera by Nicias, mentions Scandeia. Nicias sailed against the island with 60 triremes. Ten of them took Scandeia upon the coast (ἡ ἐπὶ θαλάσσῃ πόλις, Σκάνδεια καλουμένη).

Its site is located near the modern Palaiopoli.
