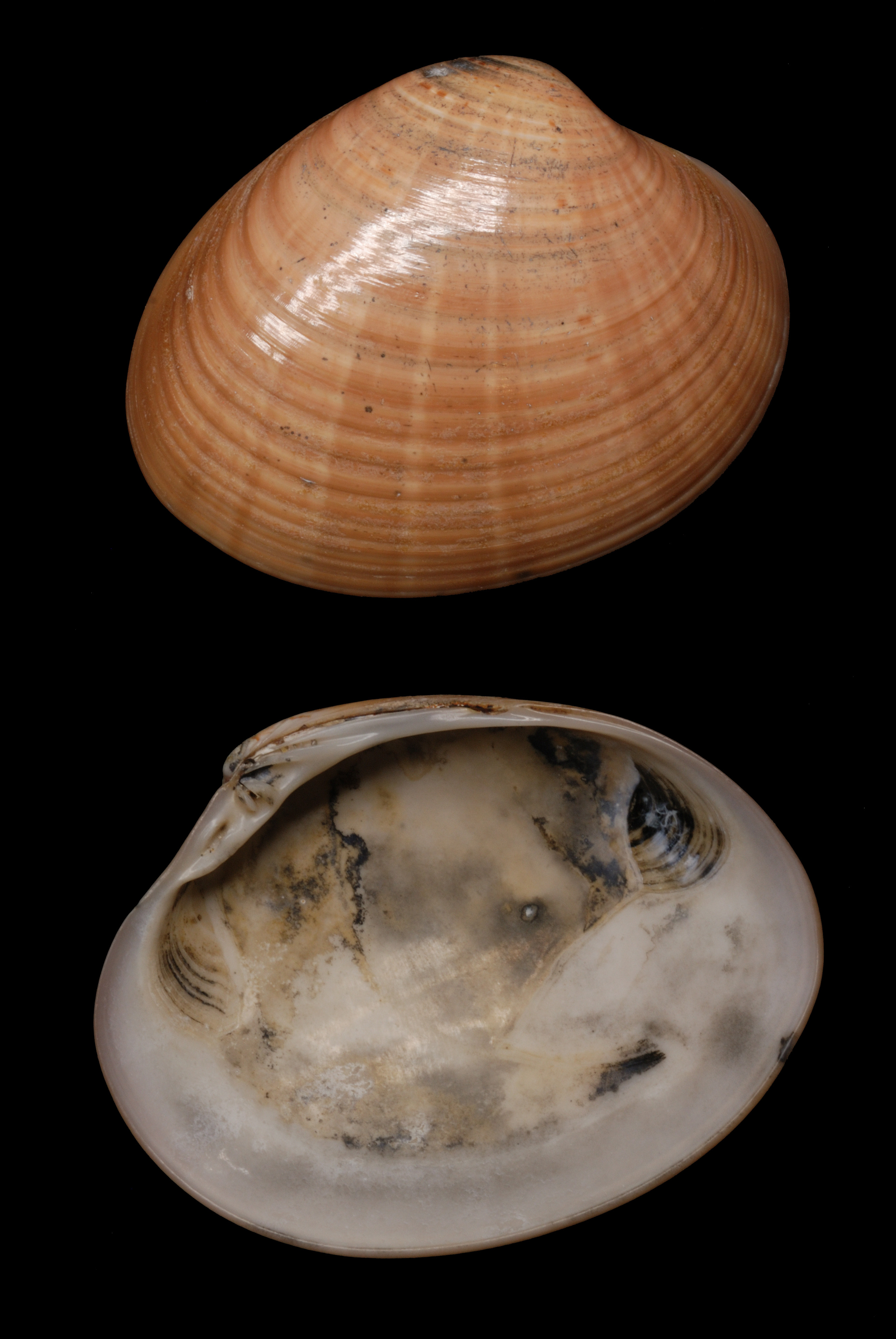

Scientific classification
- Kingdom: Animalia
- Phylum: Mollusca
- Class: Bivalvia
- Order: Venerida
- Family: Veneridae
- Genus: Callista
- Species: C. chione

Binomial name
- Callista chione (Linnaeus, 1758)

Synonyms
- Cytherea chione; Meretrix chione

= Callista chione =

Smooth clam

Species of bivalve

Callista chione, the smooth clam, is a rather large, temperate, marine, bivalve mollusc that inhabits sandy bottoms or with small pebbles in clean waters down to about 200 m from the British Isles to the Mediterranean. (Note: Details about the species and its fisheries) The shell can reach up to about 110 mm Ø, its outer side is smooth and ranges from light greenish creamy colour to medium brown, probably varies to match the background; the interior is white to soft pink. The concentric and radial growth lines are easily seen. Callista chione is edible, different dishes are prepared throughout the Mediterranean in Spain, Italy, France, the Balkan and the Maghreb countries.

It has been found that, as is the case with many bivalve molluscs, which are filter-feeders, (they feed by filtering food particles from the water), that Callista chione, common in fish markets in the Mediterranean, concentrates toxins from dinoflagellates blooms associated with pollution events such as red tides, (Note: See for instance R.A. Vollenweider, A. Rinaldi, R. Viviani and E. Todini. 1996. Assessment of the state of eutrophication in the Mediterranean sea. MAP Technical Reports Series No. 106. UNEP, Athens.) sewage water, old sediment dredging, ship ballast water dumping, etc. These toxins cannot be eliminated by the traditional cleansing of shellfish in clean water or by cooking, and can be responsible for complex human health problems: respiratory ailments, skin rashes, even paralysis, etc., such as it is known now to have occurred in New Orleans, associated with the contact or ingestion of severely contaminated water, left by Hurricane Katrina. The commonest of these dangers is known as PSP or paralytic shellfish poisoning.

Right and left valve of the same specimen:

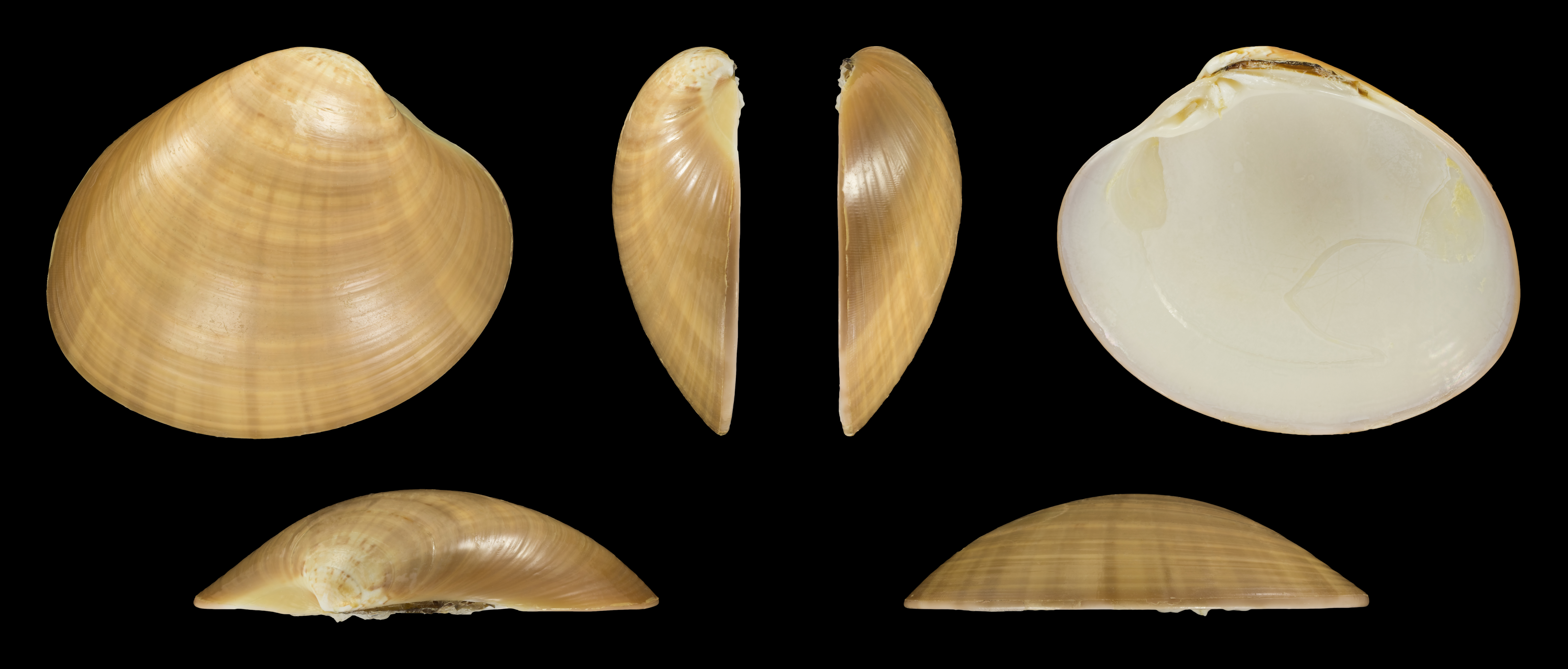
Right valve

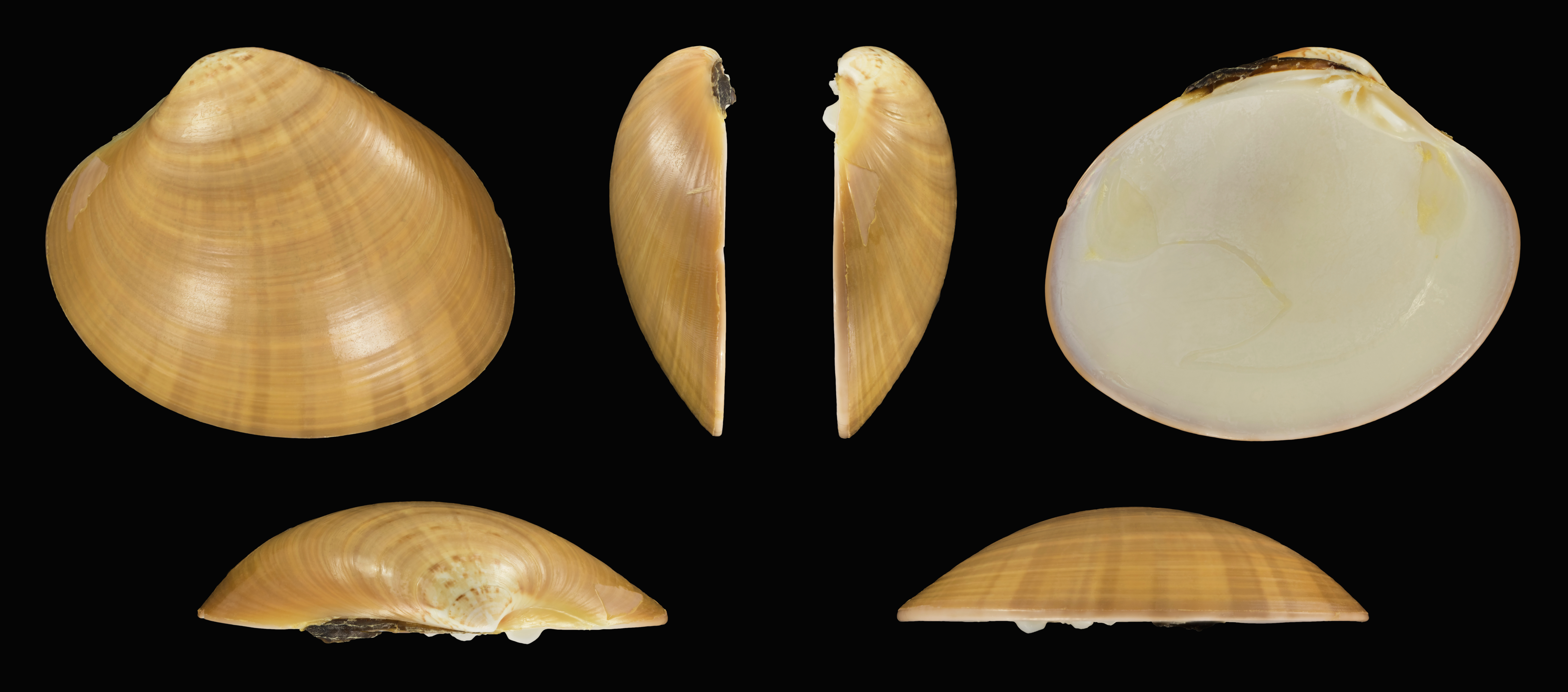
Left valve
