= USS Cythera (PY-26) =

United States Navy patrol vessel

Coordinates: 33°30′N 75°40′W

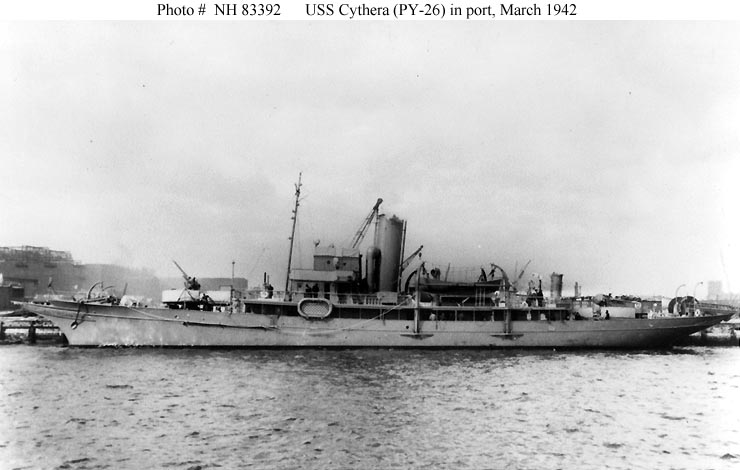

United States
- Name: Agawa
- Operator: William L. Harkness
- Builder: Ramage and Ferguson, Ltd., Leith, Scotland
- Launched: 20 September 1906
- Fate: Leased to U.S. Navy 1917

United States Navy
- Name: USS Cythera (SP-575)
- Acquired: 1917
- Commissioned: 20 October 1917
- Decommissioned: 17 March 1919
- Fate: Returned to owner 19 March 1919
- Operator: William L. Harkness
- Acquired: Returned by U.S. Navy 19 March 1919
- Fate: Acquired by U.S. Navy 31 December 1941

United States Navy
- Name: USS Cythera (PY-26)
- Acquired: 31 December 1941
- Commissioned: 3 March 1942
- Stricken: 24 June 1942
- Fate: Sunk 2 May 1942

General characteristics as U.S. Navy vessel
- Displacement: 1,000 tons
- Length: 215 feet (65.5 m)
- Beam: 27 feet 6 inches (8.4 m)
- Draft: 12 feet (3.7 m)
- Speed: 12 knots (14 mph; 22 km/h)
- Complement: 113
- Armament: 3 x 3-inch (76.2 mm) gun mounts

The first USS Cythera (SP-575/PY-26) was a United States Navy patrol vessel that saw service in the Atlantic Ocean during both World War I and World War II.

== History ==
The vessel was constructed in Leith, Scotland, originally laid down as the civilian yacht Agawa for William L. Harkness and launched on 20 September 1906.

=== World War I ===
The United States Navy leased the vessel from Harkness in 1917 for World War I service in the section patrol. She was commissioned as USS Cythera (SP-575) on 20 October 1917. Departing New York City on 27 October 1917, Cythera arrived at Newport, Rhode Island, on 28 October 1917 and was assigned to Patrol Force, United States Atlantic Fleet. She departed Newport on 1 November 1917 with her squadron, and escorted and towed submarine chasers to European waters before arriving at Gibraltar on 29 December 1917. Based at Gibraltar, she patrolled and escorted convoys between Gibraltar and Mediterranean ports in France, Italy, and North Africa. She was decommissioned on 17 March 1919 and returned to Harkness on 21 March 1919.

=== World War II ===
After Cythera served as a civilian vessel for more than two decades, the U.S. Navy reacquired her from Harkness's widow Edith on 31 December 1941 for World War II service. She was classified as a patrol yacht and given the hull number PY-26. Her conversion into a patrol vessel was completed on 28 February 1942, and she was placed in service on 3 March 1942. On 2 May 1942, while escorting the Soviet tanker SS Ashkhabad, she was torpedoed and sunk by the German submarine U-402 in the Atlantic Ocean off the coast of North Carolina. Of the 71 crewmen on board Cythera at the time, only two survived. They were picked up by U-402 and made prisoners of war.
