= German submarine U-84 (1941) =

German World War II submarine

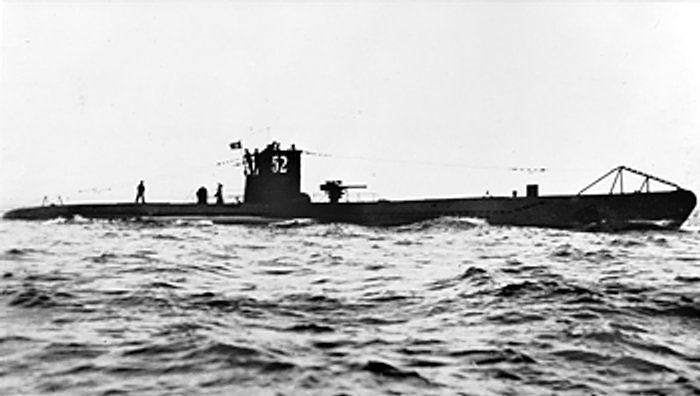
- U-52, a typical Type VIIB boat

History

Nazi Germany
- Name: U-84
- Ordered: 9 June 1938
- Builder: Flender Werke AG, Lübeck
- Yard number: 280
- Laid down: 9 November 1939
- Launched: 26 February 1941
- Commissioned: 29 April 1941
- Fate: Sunk by US aircraft, 7 August 1943

General characteristics
- Class & type: Type VIIB submarine
- Displacement: 753 tonnes (741 long tons) surfaced; 857 t (843 long tons) submerged
- Length: 66.50 m (218 ft 2 in) o/a; 48.80 m (160 ft 1 in) pressure hull
- Beam: 6.20 m (20 ft 4 in) o/a; 4.70 m (15 ft 5 in) pressure hull
- Height: 9.50 m (31 ft 2 in)
- Draught: 4.74 m (15 ft 7 in)
- Installed power: 2,800–3,200 PS (2,100–2,400 kW; 2,800–3,200 bhp) (diesels); 750 PS (550 kW; 740 shp) (electric)
- Propulsion: 2 shafts; 2 × diesel engines; 2 × electric motors
- Speed: 17.9 knots (33.2 km/h; 20.6 mph) surfaced; 8 knots (15 km/h; 9.2 mph) submerged
- Range: 8,700 nmi (16,100 km; 10,000 mi) at 10 knots (19 km/h; 12 mph) surfaced; 90 nmi (170 km; 100 mi) at 4 knots (7.4 km/h; 4.6 mph) submerged
- Test depth: 220 m (720 ft); Crush depth: 230–250 m (750–820 ft)
- Complement: 4 officers, 40–56 enlisted
- Sensors & processing systems: Gruppenhorchgerät
- Armament: 5 × 53.3 cm (21 in) torpedo tubes (four bow, one stern); 14 × torpedoes or 26 TMA mines; 1 × 8.8 cm (3.46 in) deck gun (220 rounds); 1 × 2 cm (0.79 in) C/30 anti-aircraft gun

Service record
- Part of: 1st U-boat Flotilla; 29 April 1941 – 7 August 1943
- Identification codes: M 40 057
- Commanders: Oblt.z.S. / Kptlt. Horst Uphoff; 29 April 1941 – 7 August 1943
- Operations: 8 patrols: 1st patrol: 9 August – 22 September 1941; 2nd patrol: 16 October – 18 November 1941; 3rd patrol: 21 December 1941 – 7 February 1942; 4th patrol: 16 March – 16 May 1942; 5th patrol: 10 June – 13 August 1942; 6th patrol: 29 September – 7 December 1942; 7th patrol: 17 February – 4 May 1943; 8th patrol: 10 June – 7 August 1943
- Victories: 6 merchant ships sunk (29,905 GRT); 1 merchant ship damaged (7,176 GRT)

German submarine U-84 was a Type VIIB U-boat of Nazi Germany's Kriegsmarine during World War II.

She was launched on 26 February 1941 and commissioned on 29 April 1941. She operated during the Battle of the Atlantic during the Second World War.

== Design ==
German Type VIIB submarines were preceded by the shorter Type VIIA submarines. U-84 had a displacement of 753 tonnes (741 long tons) when at the surface and 857 tonnes (843 long tons) while submerged. She had a total length of 66.50 m (218 ft 2 in), a pressure hull length of 48.80 m (160 ft 1 in), a beam of 6.20 m (20 ft 4 in), a height of 9.50 m (31 ft 2 in), and a draught of 4.74 m (15 ft 7 in). The submarine was powered by two Germaniawerft F46 four-stroke, six-cylinder supercharged diesel engines producing a total of 2,800 to 3,200 metric horsepower (2,060 to 2,350 kW; 2,760 to 3,160 shp) for use while surfaced, two AEG GU 460/8-276 double-acting electric motors producing a total of 750 metric horsepower (550 kW; 740 shp) for use while submerged. She had two shafts and two 1.23 m (4 ft) propellers. The boat was capable of operating at depths of up to 230 metres (750 ft).

The submarine had a maximum surface speed of 17.9 knots (33.2 km/h; 20.6 mph) and a maximum submerged speed of 8 knots (15 km/h; 9.2 mph). When submerged, the boat could operate for 90 nautical miles (170 km; 100 mi) at 4 knots (7.4 km/h; 4.6 mph); when surfaced, she could travel 8,700 nautical miles (16,100 km; 10,000 mi) at 10 knots (19 km/h; 12 mph). U-84 was fitted with five 53.3 cm (21 in) torpedo tubes (four fitted at the bow and one at the stern), fourteen torpedoes, one 8.8 cm (3.46 in) SK C/35 naval gun, 220 rounds, and one 2 cm (0.79 in) anti-aircraft gun The boat had a complement of between forty-four and sixty.

== Service history ==
U-84 carried out eight patrols and accounted for six ships sunk and one ship damaged during World War II. She operated in the Gulf of Mexico for a time. Commanded by Captain Uphoff, U-84 torpedoed the freighter Baja California just forward of midships whilst in the Gulf of Mexico on 19 July 1942 at 06:45. Baja California sank in about 114 feet (35 m) of water about 60 to 70 nautical miles (110 to 130 km; 69 to 81 mi) southwest of Fort Myers, Florida. Baja California, en route from New Orleans, Louisiana to Key West, was carrying a load of general cargo which included glassware.

== Fate ==
U-84 was sunk while under the command of Horst Uphoff on 7 August 1943 in the North Atlantic, in position 27°55′N 68°03′W by a Mk 24 homing torpedo dropped on it by a US B24 Liberator aircraft (VB-105/B-4 USN). 46 dead (all hands lost).

== Wolfpacks ==
U-84 took part in seventeen wolfpacks, namely:

- Grönland (16 – 27 August 1941)
- Markgraf (27 August – 13 September 1941)
- Schlagetot (20 October – 1 November 1941)
- Raubritter (1 – 4 November 1941)
- Seydlitz (27 December 1941 – 13 January 1942)
- Zieten (13 – 22 January 1942)
- Endrass (12 – 17 June 1942)
- Panther (6 – 20 October 1942)
- Veilchen (20 October – 5 November 1942)
- Kreuzotter (9 – 19 November 1942)
- Sturmbock (21 – 26 February 1943)
- Wildfang (26 February – 5 March 1943)
- Raubgraf (7 – 20 March 1943)
- Seewolf (24 – 30 March 1943)
- Adler (7 – 13 April 1943)
- Meise (13 – 20 April 1943)
- Specht (21 – 25 April 1943)

== Summary of raiding history ==
Date	Name of ship	Nationality	Tonnage (GRT)	Fate
8 April 1942	Nemanja	Yugoslavia	5,226	Sunk
21 April 1942	Chenango	Panama	3,014	Sunk
23 June 1942	Torvanger	Norway	6,568	Sunk
13 July 1942	Andrew Jackson	United States	5,990	Sunk
19 July 1942	Baja California	Honduras	1,648	Sunk
21 July 1942	William Cullen Bryant	United States	7,176	Damaged
2 November 1942	Empire Sunrise	United Kingdom	7,459	Sunk

== Bibliography ==
- Busch, Rainer; Röll, Hans-Joachim (1999). German U-boat commanders of World War II: a biographical dictionary. Translated by Brooks, Geoffrey. London, Annapolis, Md: Greenhill Books, Naval Institute Press. ISBN 1-55750-186-6.
- Busch, Rainer; Röll, Hans-Joachim (1999). Der U-Boot-Krieg, 1939-1945: Deutsche U-Boot-Verluste von September 1939 bis Mai 1945 [German U-boat losses from September 1939 to May 1945] (in German). Vol. IV. Hamburg, Berlin, Bonn: Mittler. ISBN 3-8132-0514-2.
- Gröner, Eric; Jung, Dieter; Maass, Martin (1991). German Warships 1815-1945: U-boats and Mine Warfare Vessels. Vol. 2. Translated by Thomas, Keith; Magowan, Rachel. London: Conway Maritime Press. ISBN 0-85177-593-4.
