= Siegfried von Forstner =

German naval officer and U-boat commander during World War II

- Born: 19 September 1910; Hannover
- Died: 13 October 1943 (aged 33); Atlantic Ocean †
- Military career
- Allegiance: Weimar Republic (to 1933); Nazi Germany
- Branch: Reichsmarine; Kriegsmarine
- Service years: 1930–43
- Rank: Korvettenkapitän posthumously promoted to Fregattenkapitän
- Units: SSS Niobe cruiser Emden survey vessel Meteor battleship Hessen cruiser Admiral Scheer cruiser Nürnberg; Panzerschiff Deutschland; U-99
- Commands: U-402
- Conflicts: World War II: Battle of the Atlantic; convoy SC 107; convoy SC 118
- Awards: Knight's Cross of the Iron Cross

Korvettenkapitän Siegfried Freiherr von Forstner (19 September 1910 – 13 October 1943^{[b]}) was a German U-boat commander during World War II. He was also a recipient of the Knight's Cross of the Iron Cross. He and his entire crew of U-402 were killed in action on 13 October 1943.

== Background ==
Von Forstner was the son of an aristocratic Prussian family whose men had served for generations as Army and Navy officers. His younger brother Wolfgang Friedrich (born in 1916) was also a U-boat commander, and two other brothers (Ernst Richard and Hans Dietrich) were Army officers. Wolfgang was the only brother to survive World War II. Their great-grandfather and grandfather had been army officers, and their father was a general, Ernst Freiherr von Forstner (1869–1950), who had won the Pour le Mérite with cluster as a regimental commander during World War I. Their uncle George Gunther von Forstner had commanded U-1 and U-28 during World War I, and another uncle in the service of the Imperial Navy had died in that conflict.

== Career ==
Siegfried von Forstner joined the Kriegsmarine in 1930 and served for four years on the German cruiser Nürnberg following training as an artillery technical officer. Many of his year group were already at sea in submarines when he entered U-boat school in 1940. Von Forstner received training as a student commander aboard U-99 under his Naval School classmate Otto Kretschmer. After a 5-month tour in U-59, von Forstner assumed command of U-402. Von Forstner carried out eight combat patrols in U-402 sinking 14 merchantmen and one warship and damaging three other ships.

Von Forstner married in Hamburg in December, 1940, while waiting to take command of U-402. His wife Annamaria made distinctive red pom-poms for the crew of U-402 to wear on their uniform hats. No ships were sunk during the first U-402 patrol from 26 October 1941 to 9 December 1941. On the second patrol von Forstner damaged the 12000-ton troopship Llangibby Castle off the Bay of Biscay on 16 January 1942 but the damaged troopship was able to make repairs in the Azores.

Von Forstner then made two patrols off the Atlantic coast of the United States. He sank a 4800-ton ship en route and then sank the 5300-ton Russian tanker Ashkabad and the 602-ton converted yacht USS Cythera off Cape Hatteras on 2 May 1942. On the next patrol, U-402 was depth charged by patrol bombers off Cape Hatteras in mid-July and suffered a battery explosion.

Von Forstner received the Knight's Cross of the Iron Cross for torpedoing twelve ships from convoy SC 107 and convoy SC 118. Baron von Forstner sank two ships during a submerged daylight attack on convoy SC 129 before U-402 was depth charged and damaged by the corvette Gentian.

Von Forstner and his wife saved their home in Hamburg from burning during August, 1943, air-raids by staying on the roof and extinguishing incendiary bombs. Following departure for her last patrol on 4 September 1943, U-402 shot down an attacking RAF 172 Squadron Vickers Wellington bomber over the Bay of Biscay, The submarine also provided flak protection for U-377 when the latter was attacked by a B-24 Liberator bomber during the battle of Convoy ON 202. A U-boat believed by the Allied Anti-Submarine Assessment Committee to be U-402 was sunk with all hands on 13 October 1943 by a Mark 24 FIDO Torpedo dropped by Grumman TBF Avenger aircraft from USS Card.

== Awards ==
- Wehrmacht Long Service Award 4th Class (2 October 1936)
- Sudetenland Medal (20 December 1938)
- Iron Cross (1939)
  - 2nd Class (18 February 1942)
  - 1st Class (7 August 1942)
- Knight's Cross of the Iron Cross on 9 February 1943 as Kapitänleutnant and commander of U-402
