= La Pallice =

Port in La Rochelle, France

Coordinates: 46°09′30″N 1°13′40″W

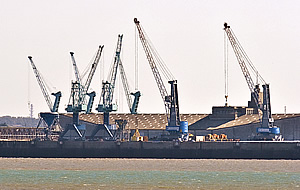
Grue la Pallice

La Pallice (also known as grand port maritime de La Rochelle) is the commercial deep-water port of La Rochelle, France.

During the Fall of France, on 19 June 1940, approximately 6,000 Polish soldiers in exile under the command of Stanisław Sosabowski arrived at La Pallice, from where they were evacuated to Great Britain – thus able to go on fighting till the end of the war.

Under the Nazi Occupation of France, La Pallice was used as a U-boat base (Base sous-marine de La Rochelle) from October 1941 when the 3rd U-boat Flotilla was moved there from its base in Kiel. La Pallice was subject to the allied siege of La Rochelle in 1944–45, which ended with the capitulation of Germany. The large submarine base built at that time still stands but is largely not in use. It was used as a backdrop for the film Das Boot (1981) and Raiders of the Lost Ark (1981).

La Pallice is equipped with oil unloading equipment, and mainly handles tropical wood. It is also the home of La Rochelle's fishing fleet, which was moved from the old harbour in the city centre during the 1980s.

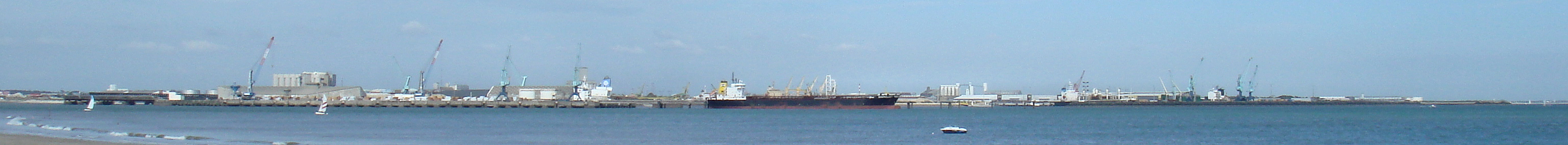
Panorama of La Pallice industrial harbour, seen from Île de Ré
