= Force X =

French Navy squadron in World War II

The Force X was a squadron of the French Navy, assembled on 29 April 1940, after the outbreak of the Second World War, to deter Italy from striking in the Levantine Sea. It consisted of the old battleship Lorraine; the three modern heavy cruisers Duquesne, Tourville and Suffren; the light cruiser Duguay-Trouin; three destroyers Basque, Forbin, Fortuné; and the submarine Protée.

== Career ==
Under Admiral Godfroy, the squadron departed Toulon on 25 April 1940, arriving at Alexandria on 24 May, where she met with her British counterpart under Admiral Sir Andrew Cunningham.

On 4 July 1940, a secret order from British Prime Minister Churchill, Operation Catapult, tasked the Royal Navy to destroy, neutralise or capture French naval forces. Godfroy and Cunningham having a trusting relationship, and their families being related by alliance, they engaged in negotiations and managed a compromise, whereby French ships would remove fuel from their bunkers and firing mechanisms from their weapons, and the remaining crews would not attempt to escape; in return, Cunningham promised to repatriate most of the crews, accepted that the ships retain their French commanding officers, and would not be scuttled. The heavy cruiser Duquesne would be allowed to radio official messages, and private messages once a week. On the occasion, several officers deserted to join the Free French, such as Commander Auboyneau, or Lieutenant-Commander d'Estienne d'Orves and his companions Roger Barberot and André Patou. The ships were then interned at Alexandria with skeleton crews. Godfroy and Cunningham signed the convention on 7 July, and renewed it on 20 June 1942.

On 30 May 1943, following the invasion of the so-called Free Zone by the Nazis, the whole of Force X joined the Allies. Admiral Godfroy was thus granted authorisation from the British to put to sea, and put his forces at the disposal of the provisional government in Algiers, as the French Committee of National Liberation was put in place. The squadron rallied Dakar through the Suez Canal and Cape Town, before arriving at Algiers. Upon his arrival, Godfroy, suspected of favouring General Giraud over De Gaulle, was retired by decree in December 1943.

== Order of battle ==
- Battleship Lorraine
- Heavy cruiser Duquesne
- Heavy cruiser Suffren
- Heavy cruiser Tourville
- Light cruiser Duguay-Trouin
- Destroyer Basque
- Destroyer Forbin
- Destroyer Fortuné
- six torpedo boats
- Submarine Protée

== Sources and references ==
=== Bibliography ===
- René Godfroy, L’Aventure de la force X (escadre française de la Méditerranée orientale) à Alexandrie, Plon, Paris, 1953.
- Masson, Philippe (1991). La marine française et la guerre 1939-1945. Paris: Éditions Tallandier. ISBN 2-235-020410.
