= René-Émile Godfroy =

French Navy officer (1885–1981)

- Born: 10 January 1885; Paris, France
- Died: 16 January 1981 (aged 96); Fréjus, France
- Military career
- Allegiance: France
- Branch: French Navy
- Service years: 1901-1943
- Rank: Vice admiral
- Commands: Force X
- Conflicts: World War II

Vice-Admiral René-Émile Godfroy (10 January 1885 – 16 January 1981) was a French Navy officer who was the commander of the Force X at the outbreak of the Second World War. He was interned with his command at Alexandria until 1943, and then retired on suspicion of favouring Henri Giraud over Charles De Gaulle.

== Biography ==
Godfroy was born at Paris. In June 1940, he commanded French naval forces at Alexandria, where he negotiated, with British Admiral Andrew Cunningham, the peaceful internment of his ships.

The French squadron consisted of the battleship Lorraine, four cruisers (Duquesne, Tourville, Suffren and Duguay-Trouin), three destroyers (Basque, Forbin, Le Fortuné) and a submarine (Argo). The French emptied their fuel bunkers and removed the firing mechanisms from their guns. Cunningham promised to repatriate the ships' crews. Controversially, after the collapse of Vichy authority following British and American landings in North Africa in November 1942 and the subsequent German occupation of Vichy France in November 1942, Godfroy refused to support the Allies even after all other French forces in North Africa had done so. It was only on 17 May 1943, after the Allies had cleared North Africa of Axis forces, that the British Commander-in-Chief, Levant, received a letter from Godfroy expressing the desire "to join the French Navy in North Africa". Docking of the French warships was at once started at Alexandria.

René-Emile Godfroy died at Fréjus, southern France, in January 1981, aged 96.
