= Akiko Hasegawa =

Japanese voice actress and singer

- 長谷川 明子
- Born: April 14; Niigata Prefecture, Japan
- Occupations: Voice actress, singer
- Years active: 2006–present

Akiko Hasegawa (長谷川 明子, Hasegawa Akiko) is a Japanese voice actress and singer best known as the voice of Miki Hoshii in The Idolmaster series. She also voices Akari in Fantasista Doll and Rena Asihara in Ro-Kyu-Bu!. On February 25, 2014, she announced that she has been married on her blog.

== Filmography ==
=== Anime ===
List of voice performances in anime
Year	Title	Role	Notes	Source
2006	Inukami!	Kay's mother		
2006	xxxHolic	Himawari's friend		
2007	Getsumento Heiki Mina	Tsukishima Cheer 月島チア		
2007	Da Capo II	Student		
2009	Kodomo no Jikan	Schoolgirl	OVA	
2010	Shukufuku no Campanella	Garnet		
2011	The Idolmaster	Miki Hoshii		
2012	Shirokuma Cafe	Kindergarten teacher		
2012	Robotics;Notes	Rosetta Yuuki		
2013	Photo Kano	Ruu Narita, Niimi's friend		
2013	Ro-Kyu-Bu! SS	Rena Ashihara		
2013	Fantasista Doll	Akari		
2014	Puchimas! Petit Idolmaster	Miki Hoshii, Afuu		
2023	Uma Musume Pretty Derby Season 3	Satono family maid		

=== Film ===
List of voice performances in film
Year	Title	Role	Notes	Source
2014	The Idolmaster Movie: Kagayaki no Mukōgawa e! ja:THE IDOLM@STER MOVIE 輝きの向こう側へ！	Miki Hoshii		

=== Video games ===
List of voice performances in video games
Year	Title	Role	Notes	Source
2007–present	The Idolmaster series	Miki Hoshii		
2007	Fire Emblem: Radiant Dawn	Wayu ワユ	Wii	
2008	Disgaea 3	Sapphire · Lord Knight サファイア・ロードナイト	PS3	
2008	Twinkle Crusaders	Shion Asukai	Also GoGo in 2010	
2009–2010	Shukufuku no Campanella games	Garnet	PC Adult, As Sayuri Nakano, also Portable	
2009	Da Capo II games	Morning Asahina 朝比奈ミキ	PC Adult, as Kosuyo Nishiaki	
2011	Disgaea 4	Asagi アサギ	PS3	
2012	Photo Kano	Ruu Narita	PSP, also Ebicora in 2015	
2012	Mugen Souls	Marina Canaan Bale マリナ・カナンベール	PS3	
2013	Puchimas! Petit Idolmaster	Miki Hoshii and Ahuu		
2013	Phantom Breaker: Extra	Itsuki Kōno	PS3, Xbox 360	
2014	Granblue Fantasy	Mary	Android, iOS, Web Browser	
2017	Azur Lane	Dace, Forbin, Le Mars		
2018	Super Smash Bros. Ultimate	Fletchling		

== Discography ==
=== Albums ===
List of albums, with selected chart positions
Title	Album information	Oricon
Title	Album information	Peak position
Simply Lovely	Released: September 22, 2011; Label: 5pb records	122

=== Character albums and singles ===
List of albums, with selected chart positions
Title	Album information	Oricon
Title	Album information	Peak position
The Idolmaster Master Artist 3 04 Miki Hoshii ja:THE IDOLM@STER MASTER ARTIST 3 04 星井美希	Released: June 3, 2015; Label: Nippon Columbia	5

=== Singles ===
List of albums, with selected chart positions
Title	Album information	Oricon
Title	Album information	Peak position
"LEVEL∞" ja:LEVEL∞	Released: August 5, 2009; Label: 5pb Records	63
"Sunrise!" ja:Sunrise!	Released: July 7, 2010; Label: 5pb Records	81
"I Can Fly"	Released: October 27, 2010; Label: 5pb Records	128
"Aoi Rin no pende~yuramu" ja:蒼凛のペンデュラム	Released: April 20, 2011; Label: 5pb Records	62
"Miracle Ale!" ミラクルエール!	Released: October 24, 2012; Label: 5pb Records	141
"Nijinokanatani" "虹の彼方に" ("Beyond the Rainbow")	Released: May 29, 2013; Label: 5pb Records	123
