= French cruiser Suffren =

French navy cruiser (1930–1972)

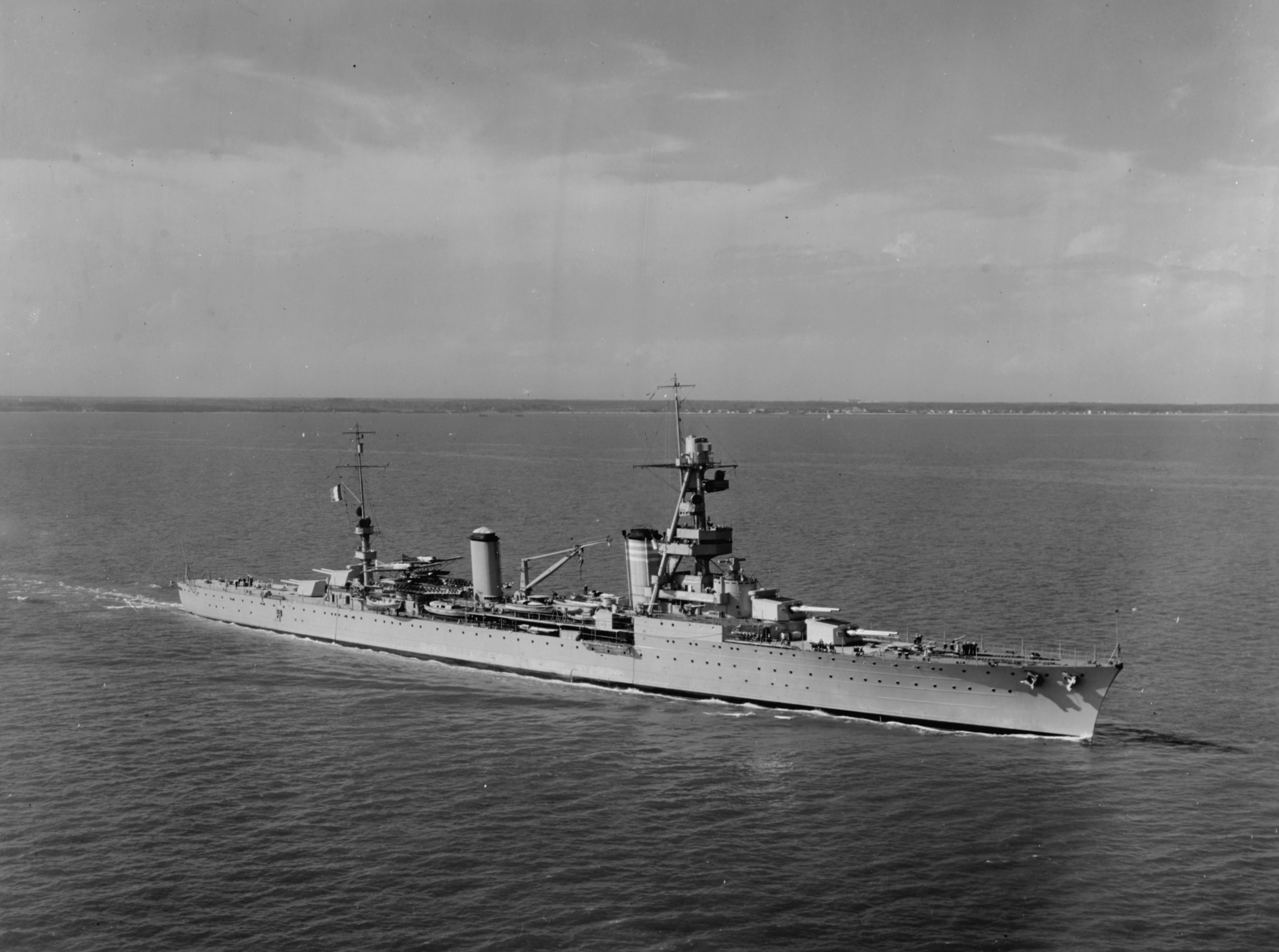
- Suffren in Hampton Roads on 15 October 1931

History

France
- Name: Suffren
- Namesake: Pierre André de Suffren de Saint Tropez
- Ordered: 1 November 1925
- Builder: Arsenal de Brest
- Laid down: 17 April 1926
- Launched: 3 May 1927
- Commissioned: 8 March 1930
- Renamed: Océan on 1 January 1963
- Stricken: 24 March 1972
- Fate: Towed for scrapping 22 February 1976

General characteristics
- Class & type: Suffren-class cruiser
- Type: Treaty Cruiser; Marine National designation; 1925 Light Cruiser; 1931 1st Class Cruiser
- Displacement: 10,160 t (10,000 long tons) (standard); 11,769 t (11,583 long tons) (Normal); 13,135 t (12,928 long tons) (full load)
- Length: 194 m (636.48 ft) overall; 185 m (606.96 ft) between perpendiculars
- Beam: 19.26 m (63.19 ft)
- Draught: 6.51 m (21.36 ft) at normal displacement
- Propulsion: 6 Guyot du Temple boilers, 20 kg/cm2 (215°); 2 small coal/oil fired cruising boilers; 3-shaft Rateau-Bretagne single-reduction geared steam turbines for 88,768.8 shp (66,194.9 kW)
- Speed: 32 knots (59 km/h) (designed)
- Range: 1,876 tons oil fuel and 640 tons coal; radius 4,600 nautical miles (8,500 km) at 15 knots (28 km/h); 2,000 nautical miles (3,700 km) at 11 knots (20 km/h) on cruise boilers; 3,700 nautical miles (6,900 km) at 20 knots (37 km/h)
- Complement: 773
- Armament: Initial; 8 × 203 mm (8.0 in)/50 guns (4 × 2); 8 × 75 mm (3.0 in)/50 AA guns (8 × 1); 8 × 37 mm (1.5 in) light AA guns (8 × 1); 12 × 13.2 mm (0.52 in) AA machine guns (6 × 2); 6 × 550 mm (22 in) torpedo tubes (2 × 3); 1943 refit; 8 × 203 mm (8.0 in)/50 guns (4 × 2); 8 × 75 mm (3.0 in)/50 AA guns (8 × 1); 8 × 40 mm (1.6 in) AA guns (2 × 4); 20 × 20 mm (0.79 in) light AA guns (20 × 1)
- Armour: Belt: 50 mm (2.0 in); Deck: 25 mm (0.98 in); Turrets and conning tower: 30 mm (1.2 in); Magazine box 50 mm (2.0 in) sides with 20 mm (0.79 in) crowns
- Aircraft carried: 2 GL-810 then Loire-Nieuport 130
- Aviation facilities: 2 catapults

Suffren was a cruiser of the French Navy. She was the first vessel of the second group of 8-inch gunned, 10,000 ton treaty cruisers built for the French navy, and spent the interwar period with the two Duquesne-class cruisers until she was sent to French Indochina. Upon her return to the Mediterranean, she rejoined the Duquesnes at Alexandria. She was interned there with the other ships of the French Navy. She returned to active service in 1943, spending her time based at Dakar on blockade patrol. Post war she aided in the return of French colonial rule to Indochina until placed in reserve in 1947. In reserve she was used as a training hulk and barracks ship at Brest. She was renamed Océan in 1963 and finally stricken in 1972.

She was named in honour of Admiral Pierre André de Suffren. Serving under Charles Henri Hector d'Estaing's fleet off North America and the West Indies from 1778 to 1779, his most significant engagements were against the Royal Navy in the Indian Ocean between 1782 and 1783. She was the sixth vessel to bear his name.

== Design and description ==
She was ordered on the 1 November 1925 as a croiseurs legers (light cruiser) from the Arsenal de Brest (Brest Naval Yard). She would be nearly identical to the Duquesne-class cruisers with a few visible changes. Her bridge would be raised above the conning tower and would be accessible by an exposed ladder. She would have two catapults between the aft funnel and the mainmast. Her armament would be identical. Her overall length would be four meters longer due to the redesign of her stern but her hull volume would be the same. She would have a shallow armoured belt over her machinery spaces. She was laid down on 17 April 1926 at Brest with her hull designated as Number 54 and launched on 3 May 1927. She fitted out and was ready for her sea trials on 20 August 1928. Her acceptance trials would follow on 20 December 1928. She was commissioned on 1 May 1929 though she would not be completed until 1 January 1930.

Initially classed as a Light Cruiser, she was reclassified on 1 July 1931 as a croiseur de 1ere classe (First class cruiser). The Marine Nationale did not have a vessel classification of heavy cruiser, instead used croiseur cuirasse (armoured cruiser) and croiseurs legers (light cruiser) prior to the London Naval Treaty and then croiseur de 1ere classe (First class cruiser) and croiseur de 2e classe (Second class cruiser) afterwards

== Service history ==
=== Pre War Service ===
She entered service with the French Navy on 5 March 1930 then assigned to the First Light Division. She arrived in Toulon with Duquesne on 27 April. She and Duquesne returned to Brest to participate in the 1930-31 training cruise in place of the lost armoured cruiser Edgar Quinet. The First Light Division left Brest on 6 October 1930 visiting Dakar, Rio de Janeiro, the French West Indies and Casablanca before entering Toulon on 10 January 1931. The First Light Division then completed the training cruise with a cruise in the Mediterranean completing in April 1931. The First Light Division then was integrated with the First Squadron. In 1933-34 she underwent a refit. Problems with her turbines resulted in an extended refit. She did not rejoin her division mates until 1 May 1936 (now the Third Light Division). On 2 November 1937 the Third Light Division was renamed as the Second Cruiser Division. On 26 June 1939 she was assigned as Flag Ship of the Indochina station and departed to replace the cruiser Primauguet arriving on 23 July 1939 at Saigon.

=== Wartime Service ===
With the outbreak of war in September, Suffren patrolled the South China seas on the lookout for German merchantmen. In November she went to Singapore to aid in the escort of an Australian troop convoy to Colombo. She continued to escort convoys in the Indian Ocean until the end of April 1940. On 18 May 1940 she arrived at Alexandria to join Vice Admiral Godfroy's Force X. She sailed in concert with cruiser Tourville and fleet torpedo boat Forbin arriving in Beirut on 21 May, joined by Duquesne and Duguay-Trouin six days later. Two more fleet torpedo boats Le Fortuné and Basque arrived on 24 and 25 May respectively. On 11 June the ships conducted a raid into the Aegean Sea off Crete, finding nothing returned to Alexandria on 13 May. On 21 June she sailed with Duguay-Trouin in response to a report of three Italian cruisers moored at Tobruk. Finding no vessels in the port they returned to Alexandria that evening. On 22 June the official notification of the French Armistice with Germany was delivered. All French ships were barred from departing the harbour after 23 June. On 3 July Vice-Admiral Cunningham presented Vice Admiral Godfroy the ultimatum - surrender the ships to British control, demilitarize the ships at their moorings or scuttle them. The admirals signed an agreement on 7 July to demilitarize the vessels.

On 17 May 1943 the ships of Force X rejoined the Allied cause as part of the Free French. On 3 July 1943 she sailed via the Suez Canal around the Cape of Good Hope to Dakar. On 22 July Suffren rescued two survivors of the British merchantman City of Canton, which was torpedoed five days earlier by German submarine U-178 off Beira, Mozambique. By August she was at Dakar. After a brief upgrading to her AA batteries she was deployed into the anti-raider barrier. Her first patrol started on 18 September 1943 returning on 23 September. She made eleven patrols by 9 March 1944. Suffren arrived in Casablanca on 17 April 1944 and was deactivated. She underwent a modernization refit lasting to 21 April 1945 at which time she sailed for Oran, Algeria then moved on to Toulon for another refit. On 24 June 1944 she sailed for Diego-Suarez with equipment for the battleship Richelieu. Then proceeding to Colombo, Ceylon where she disembarked a light intervention unit before returning to Toulon arriving on 26 August. On 12 September 1945 she departed for French Indochina.

=== Postwar service ===
Suffren arrived at Saigon on 19 October with 440 military personnel. After disembarking her passengers she embarked personnel who had been in Indochina since before the war. She departed on 27 October for France. She arrived at Toulon on 21 November. She again departed Toulon on 9 February 1946 for French Indochina arriving at Saigon on 25 February. On 20 March she sailed for Ha Long Bay and was present for a naval review on the 24th. She spent her time between Saigon and Ha Long Bay with visits to Shanghai, Hong Kong and Chinwangtao to repatriate troops left in China. She was wrongly alleged to have participated in the shelling of the Vietnamese port of Haiphong on 23 November 1946, an event that caused over six thousand casualties and contributed to the start of the First Indochina War; three avisos were the actual perpetrators. She finally departed Saigon on 18 February arriving at Toulon on 24 March 1947.

On 1 October 1947, she was placed in reserve. She was moored at Angle Robert and used as a training hulk for the gunnery school. In 1961 she became the training hulk for the sonar school. On 1 January 1963 she was renamed Océan to release her name for a guided missile frigate under construction at Lorient. She was stricken on 24 March 1972 and finally put up for sale on 5 November 1975. She left Toulon for the final time in tow for Valencia, Spain to be scrapped on 22 February 1976.

== Bibliography ==
- Jordan, John & Moulin, Jean (2013). French Cruisers 1922–1956. Barnsley, UK: Seaforth Publishing. ISBN 978-1-84832-133-5.
- McMurtrie, Francis E. (1940). Jane's Fighting Ships 1940. London, UK: Sampson Low, Marston & Company, Ltd.
- Whitley, M.J. (1995). Cruisers of World War Two – An International Encyclopedia. London, UK: Arms and Armour Press. ISBN 1-85409-225-1.
