= French destroyer Fougueux =

Destroyer of the French Navy

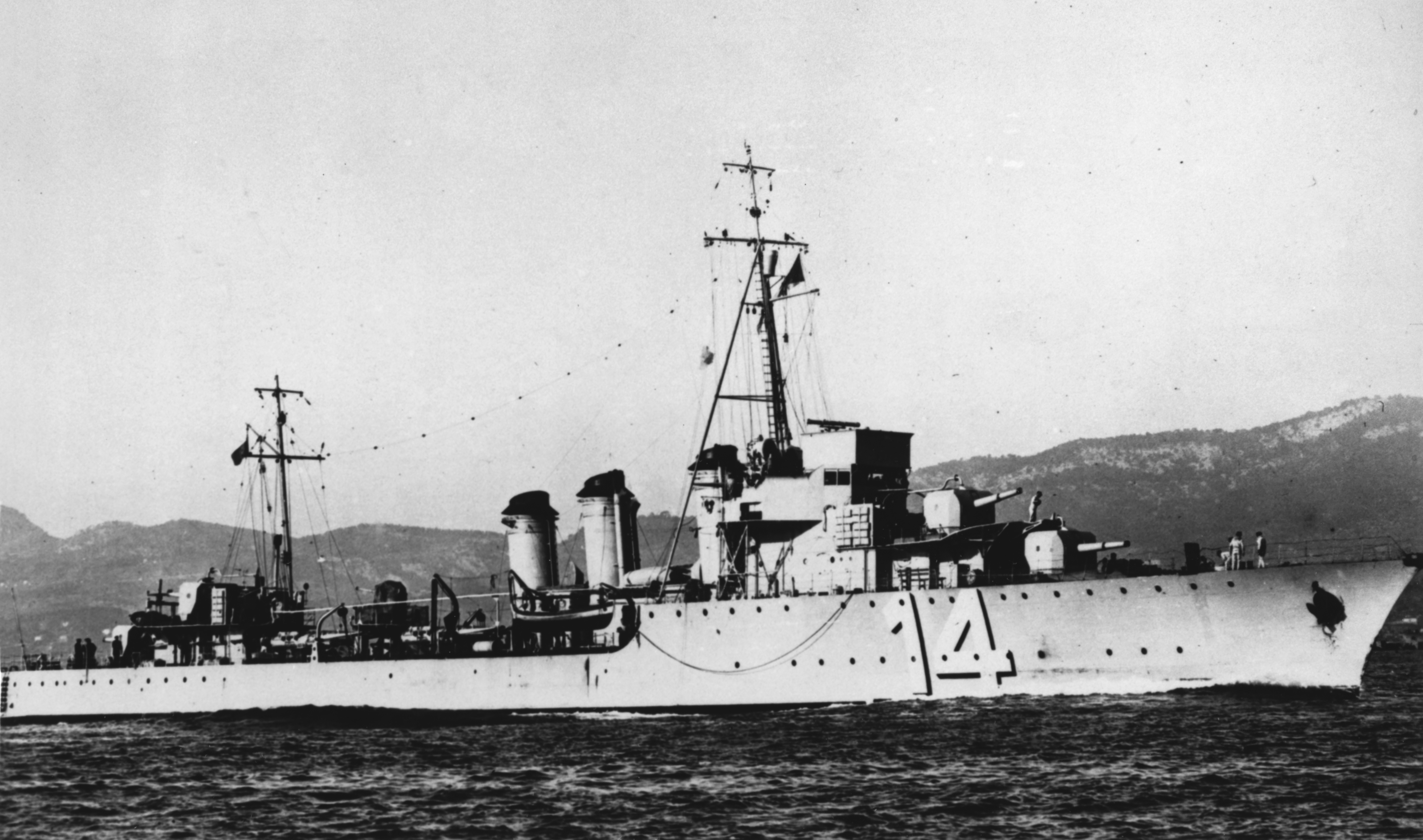
- An unknown L'Adroit-class destroyer off Toulon, c. late 1930s

History

France
- Name: Fougueux
- Ordered: 3 May 1927
- Builder: Ateliers et Chantiers de Bretagne Nantes
- Laid down: 21 September 1927
- Launched: 4 August 1928
- Completed: 15 June 1930
- Fate: Sunk by USS Massachusetts during the Naval Battle of Casablanca

General characteristics
- Class & type: L'Adroit-class destroyer
- Displacement: 1,380 t (1,360 long tons) (standard)
- Length: 107.2 m (351 ft 8 in)
- Beam: 9.9 m (32 ft 6 in)
- Draft: 3.5 m (11 ft 6 in)
- Installed power: 3 du Temple boilers; 31,000 PS (22,800 kW; 30,576 shp)
- Propulsion: 2 shafts; 2 geared steam turbines
- Speed: 33 knots (61 km/h; 38 mph)
- Range: 3,000 nmi (5,600 km; 3,500 mi) at 15 knots (28 km/h; 17 mph)
- Crew: 9 officers, 153 crewmen (wartime)
- Armament: 4 × single 130 mm (5.1 in) guns; 2 × single 37 mm (1.5 in) AA guns; 2 × triple 550 mm (21.7 in) torpedo tubes; 2 chutes and 2 throwers for 22 depth charges

The French destroyer Fougueux was one of 14 L'Adroit-class destroyers built for the French Navy during the 1920s. Completed in 1930, the ship was initially assigned to the 1st Squadron (1^{e} Escadre) in the Mediterranean. Five years later she was transferred to the 2nd Squadron (2^{e} Escadre) in the Atlantic. During the Spanish Civil War of 1936–1939, Fougueux was one of the ships that helped to enforce the non-intervention agreement.

When France declared war on Germany in September 1939, the ship spent most of the next year escorting convoys. She bombarded German troops in the Netherlands and provided naval gunfire support to French troops during the Battle of France in May 1940. Fougueux helped to escort an incomplete battleship away from Metropolitan France to prevent its capture by the Germans the following month. The ship took refuge in Casablanca, French Morocco before the Armistice with Germany later in June. She spent most of the next two years on escort duties between French North Africa and Metropolitan France. Fougueux was sunk during the Naval Battle of Casablanca in November 1942 as the Allies invaded French North Africa during Operation Torch.

== Design and description ==
The L'Adroit class was a slightly enlarged and improved version of the preceding Bourrasque class. The ships had an overall length of 107.2 meters (351 ft 8 in), a beam of 9.9 meters (32 ft 6 in), and a draft of 3.5 meters (11 ft 6 in). The ships displaced 1,380 metric tons (1,360 long tons) at standard load and 2,000 metric tons (2,000 long tons) at deep load. Fougueux was powered by two Zoelly-Schneider geared steam turbines, each driving one propeller shaft using steam provided by three du Temple boilers. The turbines were designed to produce 31,000 metric horsepower (22,800 kW; 30,576 shp), which would propel the ships at 33 knots (61 km/h; 38 mph). The ships carried 386 metric tons (380 long tons) of fuel oil which gave them a range of 3,000 nautical miles (5,600 km; 3,500 mi) at 15 knots (28 km/h; 17 mph). The crew numbered 8 officers and 134 crewmen in peacetime and 9 officers and 153 crewmen during wartime.

The main armament of the L'Adroit-class ships consisted of four Canon de 130 mm (5.1 in) mm Modèle 1924 guns in single mounts, one superfiring pair each fore and aft of the superstructure. Their anti-aircraft armament consisted of a pair of Canon de 37 mm (1.5 in) mm Modèle 1925 guns, one mount on each broadside abreast the rear superstructure. For defense against strafing aircraft the ships were equipped with a pair of mounts for two or four 8-millimeter (0.315 in) Hotchkiss Mle 1914 machine guns abreast the bridge. The ships carried two above-water triple sets of 550-millimeter (21.7 in) torpedo tubes. A pair of depth charge chutes were built into their stern; these housed a total of sixteen 200-kilogram (440 lb) depth charges. In addition two Thornycroft depth-charge throwers were fitted at the end of the forecastle for which six 100-kilogram (220 lb) depth charges were carried.

=== Modifications ===
The French Navy decided to convert some of the L'Adroit-class ships to fast fleet minesweepers to clear the path of the main battlefleet in 1933 and two paravanes were installed aboard Fougueux in 1934. A high-angle 1-meter (39 in) stereoscopic rangefinder for the anti-aircraft (AA) guns was added on the rear superstructure sometime after October 1933. The original 3-meter (9 ft 10 in) coincidence rangefinder for the main battery was replaced by a 5-meter (16 ft 5 in) model in April 1937. It was enclosed in a lightweight turret before September 1939.

The Navy belatedly began to realize the value of underwater detection systems for anti-submarine warfare in the late 1930s. The Multispot hydrophone system was installed in all the ships of the class by the end of February 1939. A French-built sonar system designated SS1 was installed in three of the L'Adroits that year and the Navy ordered 16 Type 123 ASDIC systems on 10 May 1939 from the British with a follow-on order for 25 more Type 123s and 25 of the more advanced Type 128s in October. Deliveries did not begin until August and only two systems per month were received; Fougueux received her Type 123 installation in Lorient in March 1940.

Beginning in March 1939 twin-gun mounts for the 13.2-millimeter (0.52 in) Hotchkiss Modèle 1929 machine gun began to replace the mounts for the 8 mm weapons. To compensate for the weight high in the ship of all these changes, initially one torpedo, but later two were removed from the L'Adroits. While under repair in June 1940, Fougueux had a single 25-millimeter (1 in) Hotchkiss Modèle 1939 AA gun installed on the rear superstructure and the mainmast was removed to clear the weapon's firing arc and reduce top weight. After the French armistice with Germany, the paravanes were removed and the two depth charge throwers were repositioned to the stern and another pair was added. The number of depth charges was increased to fifteen 200 kg weapons and thirty-two 100 kg weapons. The ship also received two single mounts for 13.2 mm Browning machine guns on the stern and the Hotchkiss 13.2 mm guns were provided with gun shields.

== Construction and career ==
Fougueux was ordered on 3 May 1927 as part of the 1926 Naval Program and laid down on 21 September by Ateliers et Chantiers de Bretagne at its shipyard in Nantes. The ship was launched on 4 August 1928 and completed on 15 June 1930. She was based at Toulon and assigned to the 11th Torpedo Division (11^{e} Division de torpilleurs) of the Torpedo Flotilla (Flotille de torpilleurs) of the 1st Squadron as of 1 October. Fougueux was transferred to the 2nd Squadron based at Brest on 27 July 1935 and assigned to the newly formed 2nd Torpedo Division on 1 October. The ship was detached to French Morocco in late 1935. Albert Lebrun, President of France, inaugurated the new building of the Naval Academy (École Navale) in Brest and reviewed the 2nd Squadron on 30 May 1936, including Fougueux and five of her sister ships. The 2nd Squadron was renamed as the Atlantic Squadron on 15 August and the ship remained assigned to the 2nd Torpedo Division. Fougueux and her sister Frondeur were enforcing the non-intervention agreement during the Spanish Civil War on 9 August 1938 when they were attacked by four bombers of the Spanish Republican Air Force, but the bombs fell wide of the ships.

=== World War II ===
Fougueux and most of the other destroyers were assigned convoy escort missions when the war began in September 1939. Most of them were uneventful, but the ship dropped depth charges on a periscope sighting without result on 14 January 1940. She made an unsuccessful attack on the German submarine U-44 after the submarine had sunk the freighter SS Alsacien on 24 January. On 29 March 1940, the ship's ASDIC set detected a submarine and Fougueux attacked the contact with depth charges, but it was almost certainly a sunken wreck. Fougueux and three other destroyers bombarded German troops around Walcheren and Zuid-Beveland in the Netherlands on 16–17 May. The ship supported French troops defending Boulogne-sur-Mer against German troops as they approached the port on 23–24 May. She was hit by a bomb on the morning of 24 May and had to withdraw to Cherbourg for repairs. Fougueux and Frondeur escorted the incomplete battleship Richelieu from Brest to Casablanca, French Morocco, from 18 to 20 June.

The ship was still in Casablanca when Armistice with Germany went into effect on 25 June. Convoys between Casablanca and Metropolitan France began in August and Fougueux was one of the ships tasked with escorting them. After the British attack on Dakar in September, Fougueux and Frondeur, together with the destroyers Épée and Fleuret were ordered to attack British shipping in the Strait of Gibraltar in retaliation as the Vichy French government began a policy of limited cooperation with the Axis powers. They encountered only an unidentified British destroyer and all of Épée's guns malfunctioned after firing a total of only 14 rounds while Fleuret's fire-control director broke down entirely. The ships continued onward to Oran, French Algeria. Fougueux was refitted in Algiers, French Algeria, from 23 November to 18 March 1941. On 8 April Fougueux responded to a distress call broadcast by the banana boat SS Fort de France as she was being boarded by sailors from the British armed merchant cruiser HMS Bulolo. Fort de France was retaken four days later. On 6 February 1942, Fougueux was transferred to Oran, and then helped to escort the damaged battleship Dunkerque from Mers el-Kebir, French Algeria, to Toulon on 19–20 February. The destroyer returned to Oran afterward and began a major refit there. Still assigned to the 2nd Destroyer Division, the destroyers at Casablanca were placed under the newly formed 2nd Light Squadron (2^{e} escadre légère) on 18 April. Fougueux arrived back at Casablanca on 21 August.

==== Naval battle of Casablanca ====
As Operation Torch began before dawn on 8 November, the Americans launched an amphibious landing east of Fedala, French Morocco. The 2nd Light Squadron was ordered to raise steam and attack the enemy off Fedala at 0630. Visibility was poor as the early morning haze blanketed the area and it decreased over the course of the day as smoke from burning oil storage tanks and smoke screens laid by French ships worsened. The squadron had exited the harbor by 0815 and was steaming for Fedala at 18 knots (33 km/h; 21 mph). Fougueux and Frondeur were in the rear of the formation. Rear Admiral Gervais de Lafond was commanding the squadron and he ordered it to reverse course around 0840, upon spotting the heavy cruiser Augusta, and hoping to lure it within range of the immobile battleship Jean Bart and coast-defense guns. Fougueux missed the signal and continued to lead Frondeur towards Fedala. Augusta opened fire at Fougueux at a range of 19,000 yards (17,000 m) at 0843. Around 0848 the destroyer was strafed by Grumman F4F Wildcat fighters, killing one of the navigators, the helmsman and several signalmen. One shell from Augusta near missed the ship at 0850, its splinters causing minor flooding damage. Commander Louis Sticca, Fougueux's captain, realized that his division was alone and he reversed course at 0852, not realizing that his ships were the furthest west and closest to the American ships.

Task Group 34.1, consisting of the battleship Massachusetts and her consorts, the heavy cruisers Tuscaloosa and Wichita, had finally been alerted to the French sortie and were rapidly approaching the 2nd Destroyer Division by 0900. The battleship spotted the French destroyers at 0916 and opened fire at a range of 19,400 yards (17,700 m). The French replied two minutes later, but neither side scored any hits before the American ships reversed course at 0935. Five minutes later a shell struck Fougueux's bow, crushing it up to the quarterdeck and setting the ship on fire. The ship had fired only 120 main-gun rounds thus far. Heavy flooding prompted Sticca to quickly order his crew to abandon ship. Frondeur attempted to go to her sister's aid, but she was hit by an 8-inch (203 mm) shell from Tuscaloosa at 0946. Informed that Fougueux did not need assistance, Frondeur sheered off and steamed to rendezvous with the ships of the 5th Destroyer Division.

Fougueux blew up and sank at 1000; a total of 14 men had been killed. The aviso La Grandière exited the harbor at 1006 and attempted to rescue Fougueux's survivors, but she was engaged by Tuscaloosa as soon as she was spotted by the American heavy cruiser. The sloop La Gracieuse managed to do so around 1200. La Grandière made another attempt around 1330, but exchanged shots with Augusta around that time.
