= L'Adroit-class destroyer =

Group of fourteen French Navy destroyers (torpilleur)

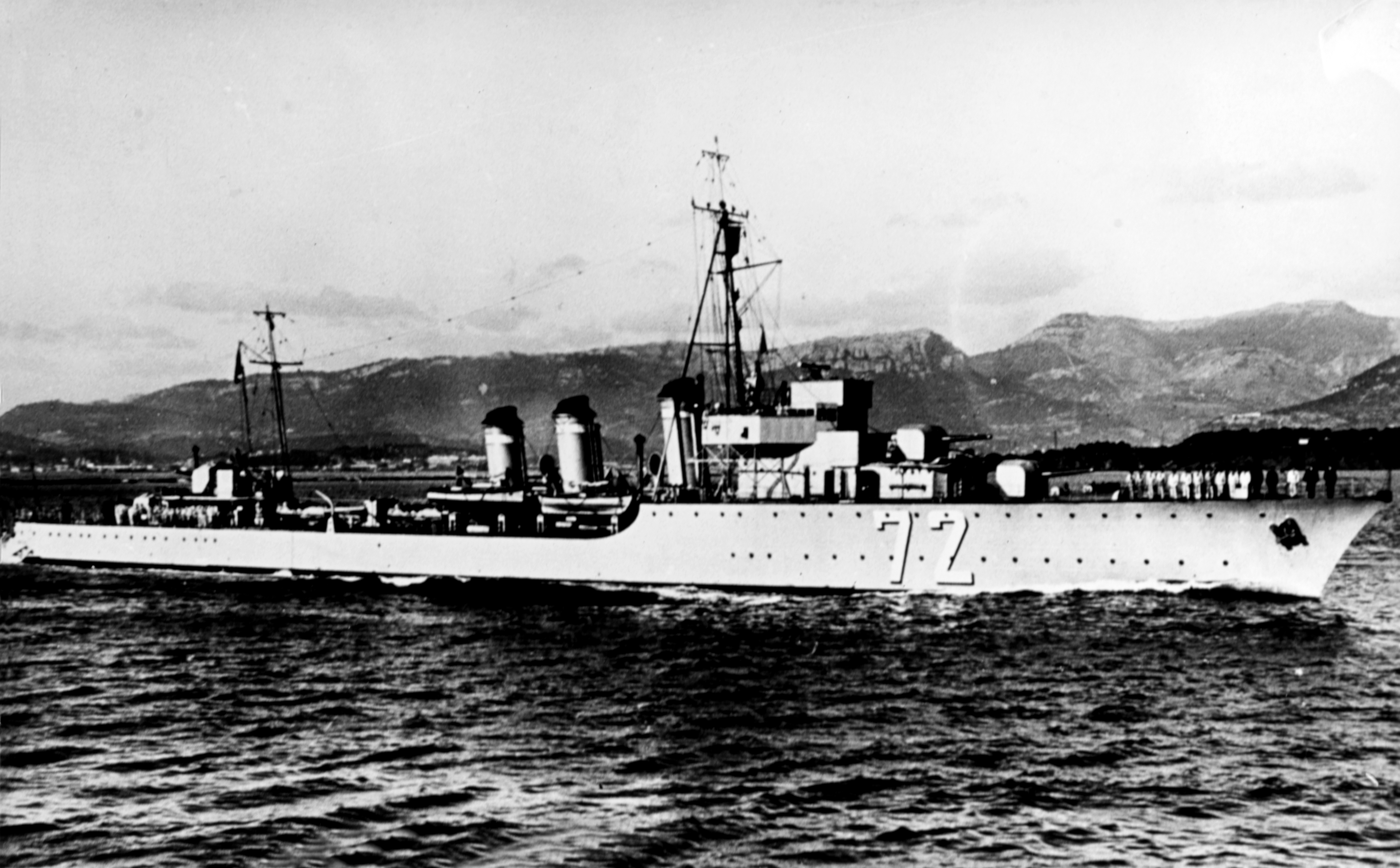
- A L'Adroit-class destroyer (either Le Fortuné or Le Mars)

Class overview
- Name: L'Adroit class
- Builders: Ateliers et Chantiers de Bretagne; Ateliers et Chantiers de France; Ateliers et Chantiers de la Seine-Maritime; Chantiers Dubigeon; Chantiers Navals Français; Dyle et Bacalan; Forges et Chantiers de la Gironde
- Preceded by: Bourrasque class
- Succeeded by: Le Hardi class
- Subclasses: Forbin
- Completed: 14
- Lost: 9
- Scrapped: 5

General characteristics
- Type: Destroyer
- Displacement: 1,378 tonnes (1,356 long tons) standard; 2,000 tonnes (2,000 long tons) full load
- Length: 107.9 m (354 ft 0 in)
- Beam: 9.84 m (32 ft 3 in)
- Draught: 4.3 m (14 ft 1 in)
- Installed power: 34,000 shp (25,000 kW)
- Propulsion: 2 shafts, geared steam turbines; 3 boilers
- Speed: 33 knots (61 km/h; 38 mph)
- Complement: 142
- Armament: 4 × 130 mm (5.1 in) guns; 2 × 37 mm (1.5 in); 2 × 13.2 mm (0.52 in) machine guns; 6 × 550 mm (21.7 in) torpedo tubes

The L'Adroit-class destroyer was a group of fourteen French Navy destroyers (torpilleur) laid down in 1925–26 and commissioned from 1928 to 1931. They were the successors to the Bourrasque class, with the same armament, but being slightly heavier overall.

== Service history ==
The class saw varied service in the Second World War.

La Railleuse was the first French destroyer casualty of the war, being blown up in Casablanca harbour by an accidental torpedo explosion on 23 March 1940. L'Adroit was sunk by a bomb from a German He 111 bomber on 21 May 1940 near Dunkirk, but her entire crew were able to escape and served in shore batteries until the French capitulation. Foudroyant was sunk in similar circumstances, but with more loss of life, on 1 June 1940.

Basque, Forbin and Le Fortuné were part of the French Alexandria squadron, which were disarmed by the British on 22 June 1940 following French capitulation. They were rearmed under Free French auspices in December 1943.

Boulonnais, Brestois, Fougueux and Frondeur were all sunk by Allied ships off Casablanca, as part of Operation Torch. L'Alcyon survived the attack and later joined the Allies.

Bordelais, La Palme and Le Mars joined many other French warships in scuttling at Toulon to stop their being taken over by the German navy.

== Ships ==
- L'Adroit (Pennant number: T2, 11, 21, 42, 41, 23, T23)
- Basque (Pennant number: 55, 11, 57, 97, 43, 42, 23, 91, 92, T92, T91, T33)
- Bordelais (Pennant number: 117, 112, 22, 81, T81, T11)
- Boulonnais (Pennant number: 11, 99, 73, 33, 53, T53, T52)
- Brestois (Pennant number: 12, 97, 14, 31, 51, T51)
- Forbin (Pennant number: 98, 15, 12, 3, 92, 91, T91, T92, T32)
- Frondeur (Pennant number: 119, 115, 23, 22, T22)
- L'Alcyon (Pennant number: 116, 112, 71, 83, T83, T23, T63)
- La Palme (Pennant number: 74, 11, 1, T11, T13)
- La Railleuse (Pennant number: 73, 12, 5, 2, T32)
- Le Fortuné (Pennant number: 72, 75, 32, 4, 1, T31)
- Le Mars (Pennant number: 71, 72, 14, 2, T12)
- Foudroyant (Pennant number: 99, 96, 44, 43, 52, T52)
- Fougueux (Pennant number: 118, 114, 21, T21)
