= French destroyer Frondeur =

Destroyer of the French Navy

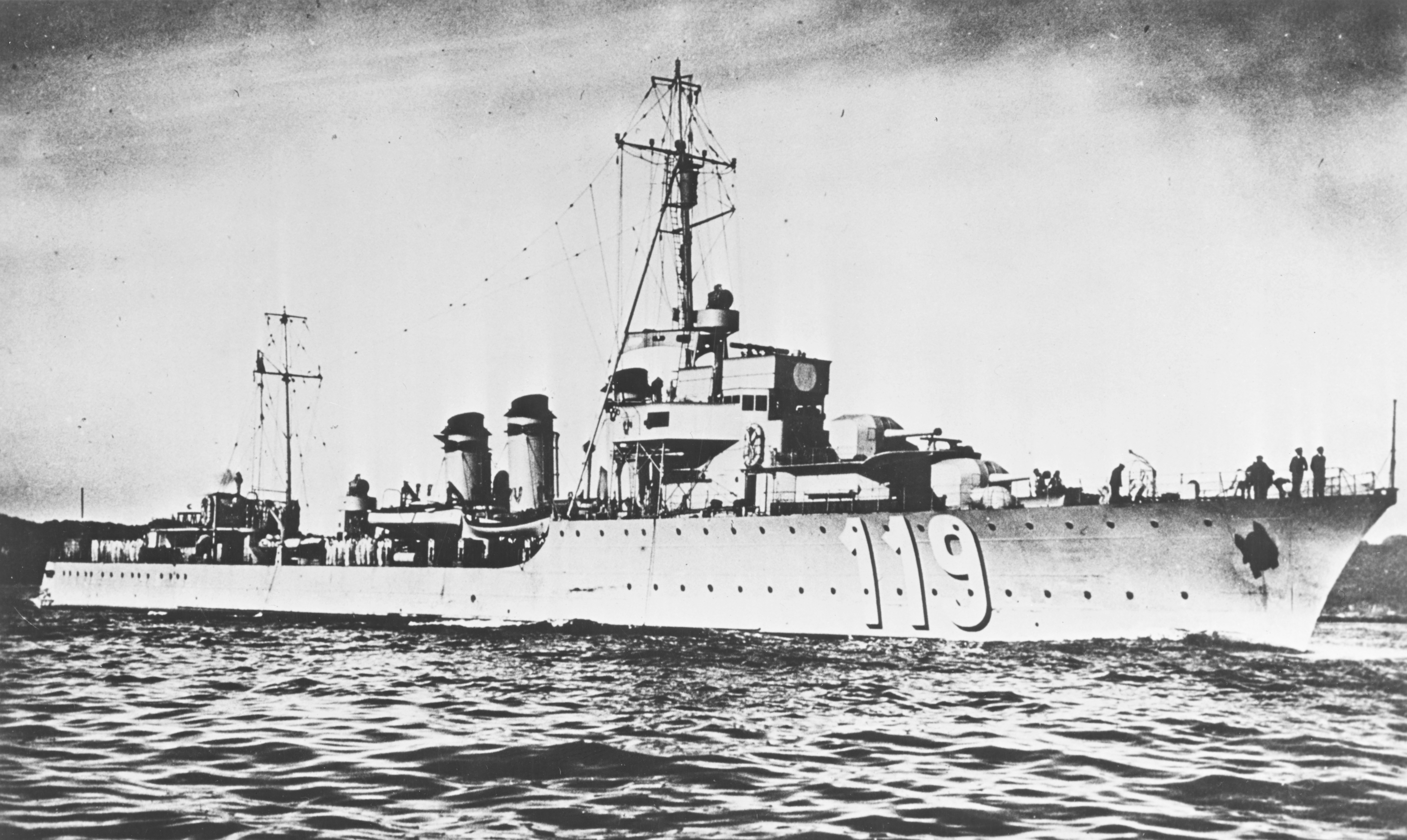

History

France
- Name: Frondeur
- Ordered: 21 April 1927
- Builder: Chantiers Navals Français, Caen
- Laid down: 9 November 1927
- Launched: 20 June 1929
- Completed: 20 October 1931
- Fate: Sunk during the Naval Battle of Casablanca, 8 November 1942

General characteristics
- Class & type: L'Adroit-class destroyer
- Displacement: 1,380 t (1,360 long tons) (standard)
- Length: 107.2 m (351 ft 8 in)
- Beam: 9.9 m (32 ft 6 in)
- Draft: 3.5 m (11 ft 6 in)
- Installed power: 3 du Temple boilers; 31,000 PS (22,800 kW; 30,576 shp)
- Propulsion: 2 shafts; 2 geared steam turbines
- Speed: 33 knots (61 km/h; 38 mph)
- Range: 3,000 nmi (5,600 km; 3,500 mi) at 15 knots (28 km/h; 17 mph)
- Crew: 9 officers, 153 crewmen (wartime)
- Armament: 4 × single 130 mm (5.1 in) guns; 2 × single 37 mm (1.5 in) AA guns; 2 × triple 550 mm (21.7 in) torpedo tubes; 2 chutes and 2 throwers for 22 depth charges

The French destroyer Frondeur was one of 14 L'Adroit-class destroyers built for the French Navy during the 1920s.

== Design and description ==
The L'Adroit class was a slightly enlarged and improved version of the preceding Bourrasque class. The ships had an overall length of 107.2 meters (351 ft 8 in), a beam of 9.9 meters (32 ft 6 in), and a draft of 3.5 meters (11 ft 6 in). The ships displaced 1,380 metric tons (1,360 long tons) at standard load and 2,000 metric tons (2,000 long tons) at deep load. Fougueux was powered by two Zoelly-Schneider geared steam turbines, each driving one propeller shaft using steam provided by three du Temple boilers. The turbines were designed to produce 31,000 metric horsepower (22,800 kW; 30,576 shp), which would propel the ships at 33 knots (61 km/h; 38 mph). The ships carried 386 metric tons (380 long tons) of fuel oil which gave them a range of 3,000 nautical miles (5,600 km; 3,500 mi) at 15 knots (28 km/h; 17 mph). The crew numbered 8 officers and 134 crewmen in peacetime and 9 officers and 153 crewmen during wartime.

The main armament of the L'Adroit-class ships consisted of four Canon de 130 mm (5.1 in) mm Modèle 1924 guns in single mounts, one superfiring pair each fore and aft of the superstructure. Their anti-aircraft armament consisted of a pair of Canon de 37 mm (1.5 in) mm Modèle 1925 guns, one mount on each broadside abreast the rear superstructure. For defense against strafing aircraft the ships were equipped with a pair of mounts for two or four 8-millimeter (0.315 in) Hotchkiss Mle 1914 machine guns abreast the bridge. The ships carried two above-water triple sets of 550-millimeter (21.7 in) torpedo tubes. A pair of depth charge chutes were built into their stern; these housed a total of sixteen 200-kilogram (440 lb) depth charges. In addition two Thornycroft depth-charge throwers were fitted at the end of the forecastle for which six 100-kilogram (220 lb) depth charges were carried.

== Construction and career ==
Frondeur was laid down on 9 November 1927, launched on 20 June 1929 and completed on 20 October 1931.

After France surrendered to Germany in June 1940 during World War II, Frondeur served with the naval force of Vichy France. She was at Casablanca, French Morocco, when Allied forces invaded French North Africa in Operation Torch in November 1942. Resisting the invasion, she was sunk by gunfire from the American cruiser USS Brooklyn off Casablanca during the Naval Battle of Casablanca.
