= French destroyer La Railleuse =

Destroyer of the French Navy

Coordinates: 33.615°N 7.577°W

History

France
- Name: La Railleuse
- Ordered: 21 November 1924
- Builder: Chantiers Dubigeon, Nantes
- Laid down: 1 August 1925
- Launched: 9 September 1926
- Completed: 15 March 1928
- Fate: Destroyed by accidental explosion, 23 March 1940

General characteristics
- Class & type: L'Adroit-class destroyer
- Displacement: 1,380 t (1,360 long tons) (standard)
- Length: 107.2 m (351 ft 8 in)
- Beam: 9.9 m (32 ft 6 in)
- Draft: 3.5 m (11 ft 6 in)
- Installed power: 3 du Temple boilers; 31,000 PS (22,800 kW; 30,576 shp)
- Propulsion: 2 shafts; 2 geared steam turbines
- Speed: 33 knots (61 km/h; 38 mph)
- Range: 3,000 nmi (5,600 km; 3,500 mi) at 15 knots (28 km/h; 17 mph)
- Crew: 9 officers, 153 crewmen (wartime)
- Armament: 4 × single 130 mm (5.1 in) guns; 2 × single 37 mm (1.5 in) AA guns; 2 × triple 550 mm (21.7 in) torpedo tubes; 2 chutes and 2 throwers for 22 depth charges

The French destroyer La Railleuse was one of 14 L'Adroit-class destroyers built for the French Navy during the 1920s. During World War II, she was destroyed when one of her torpedoes exploded on 23 March 1940.

== Design and description ==
The L'Adroit class was a slightly enlarged and improved version of the preceding Bourrasque class. The ships had an overall length of 107.2 meters (351 ft 8 in), a beam of 9.9 meters (32 ft 6 in), and a draft of 3.5 meters (11 ft 6 in). The ships displaced 1,380 metric tons (1,360 long tons) at (standard load) and 2,000 metric tons (2,000 long tons) at deep load. They were powered by two geared steam turbines, each driving one propeller shaft, using steam provided by three du Temple boilers. The turbines were designed to produce 31,000 metric horsepower (22,800 kW; 30,576 shp), which would propel the ships at 33 knots (61 km/h; 38 mph). The ships carried enough fuel oil to give them a range of 3,000 nautical miles (5,600 km; 3,500 mi) at 15 knots (28 km/h; 17 mph).

The main armament of the L'Adroit-class ships consisted of four Canon de 130 mm Modèle 1924 guns in single mounts, one superfiring pair fore and aft of the superstructure. Their anti-aircraft armament consisted of a pair of Canon de 37 mm Modèle 1925 guns. The ships carried two above-water triple sets of 550-millimeter (21.7 in) torpedo tubes. A pair of depth charge chutes were built into their stern; these housed a total of sixteen 200-kilogram (440 lb) depth charges. In addition two depth charge throwers were fitted for which six 100-kilogram (220 lb) depth charges were carried.

== Construction and career ==
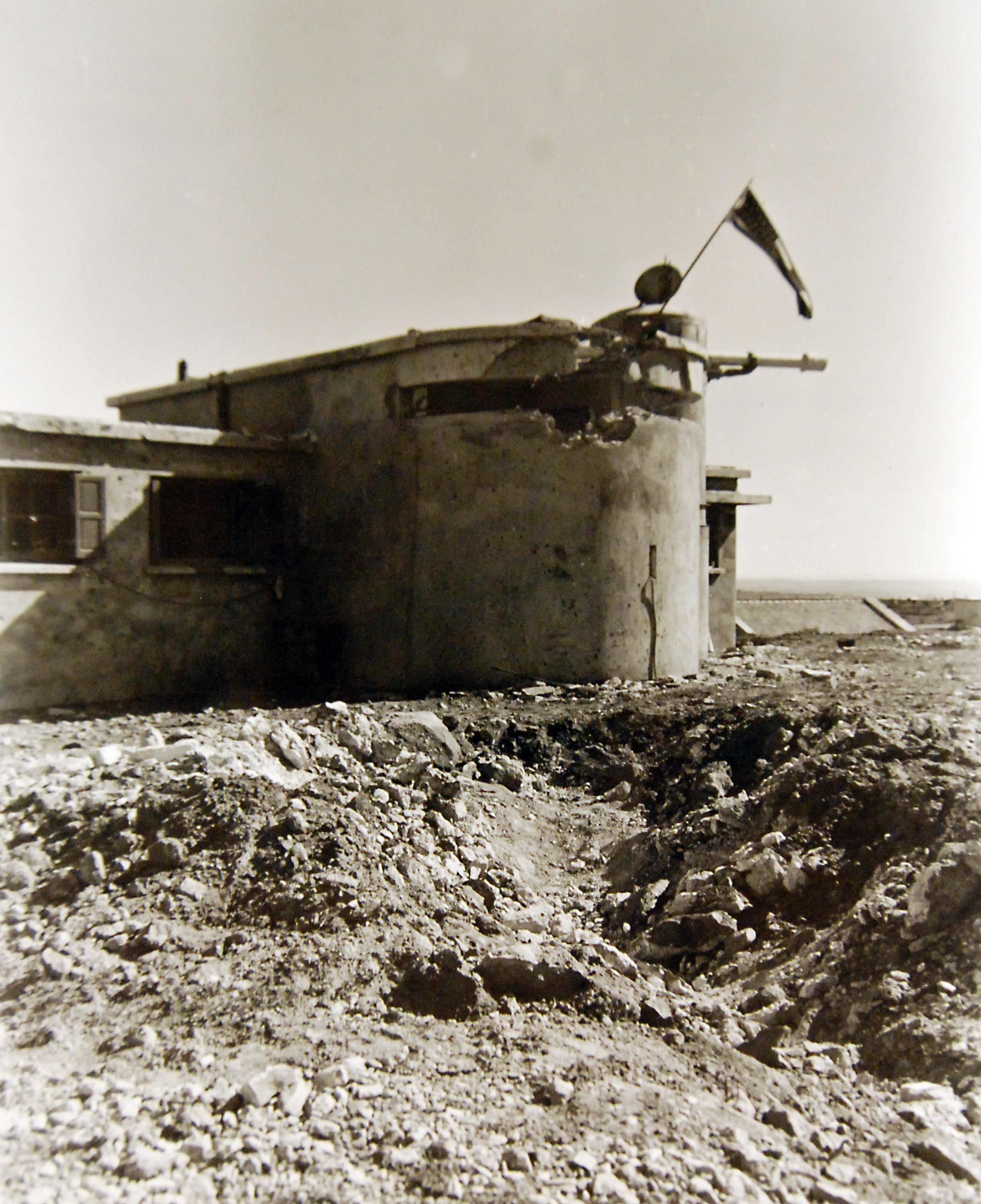
Coastal battery La Railleuse, reusing the 130 mm guns of the destroyer, damaged by US Navy fire during Operation Torch

La Railleuse was laid down on 1 August 1925, launched on 9 September 1926 and completed on 15 March 1928. She was cut in half by an accidental explosion of one of her torpedoes on 23 March 1940 (Note: Naval historians M. J. Whitley and Jürgen Rohwer say 24 March.) at Casablanca, French Morocco, killing 28 and wounding 24 crewmen. Her main guns were removed from the wreck and installed as coast-defense guns at Safi, French Morocco. Her remains were sold for scrap in April 1942.
