= Wicher-class destroyer =

WWII Polish Navy vessels

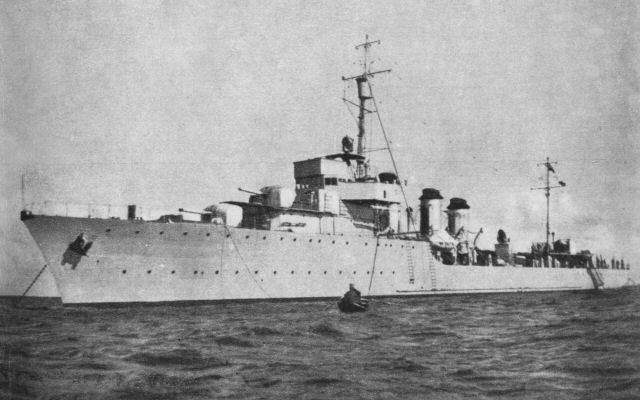
- ORP Wicher

Class overview
- Name: Wicher class
- Builders: Chantiers Navals Français
- Operators: Polish Navy
- Succeeded by: Grom class
- In commission: 1930–1960
- Completed: 2
- Lost: 1
- Retired: 1

General characteristics
- Type: Destroyer
- Displacement: 1,540 tons
- Length: 106.9 m (350 ft 9 in)
- Beam: 10.5 m (34 ft 5 in)
- Draught: 3.5 m (11 ft 6 in)
- Speed: 33.8 knots (62.6 km/h; 38.9 mph)
- Complement: 162 officers and enlisted
- Armament: 4 × 130 mm guns; 2 × 40 mm wz. 28 AA guns; 2 × triple 550 mm/533 mm/450 mm torpedo tubes; 2 × 240 mm Thornycroft depth charge launchers; 2 × Wz BH200 depth charge launchers; 60 × wz. 08 naval mines

The Wicher-class destroyers were a series of destroyers that served in the Polish Navy during World War II. Two ships of this class were built for the Second Polish Republic by Chantiers Navals Français during the late 1920s. They were modified versions of the Bourrasque-class destroyers built for the French Navy.

== History ==
After the Great War, Poland's shoreline was very short (only 142 km; 88 mi) and there was no need to create a large naval force. Initially consisting merely of four naval trawlers and two monitors — all inherited from the Kaiserliche Marine — in 1924, the Polish Navy was to start the construction of nine submarines. As Poland's greatest possible enemy at that time was perceived to be the Soviet Union, their only task would be to secure supply convoys from France in case of a war. However, due to the economic crisis and the customs war with Germany, this plan had to be abandoned and eventually only three submarines were ordered from France.

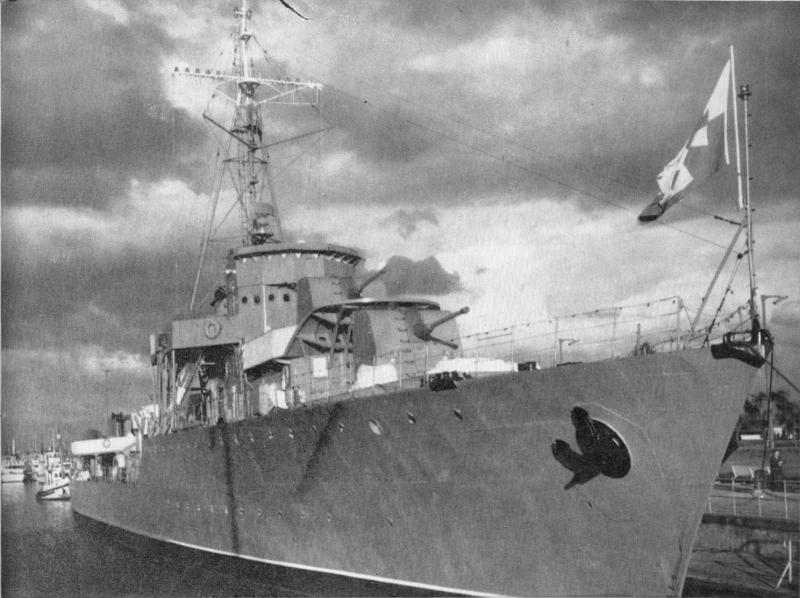
ORP Burza, the second and last ship of the Wicher class.

At that time, the government of Władysław Grabski tried to obtain a large credit from France. It has been suggested that many members of the French government were stock owners of the newly created Chantiers Naval Francais shipyard in Caen, and such a credit would be granted if the shipyard signed a contract with the Polish government. As the shipyard had no experience in shipbuilding and submersibles were believed to be very complicated to build, on September 9, 1925, it was decided instead to purchase two destroyers for the approximate price 22 million złotys. After initial talks, the shipyard presented Poland with a plan for two modified Bourrasque-class destroyers. On April 2, 1926, the contract was signed.

From the very beginning of the project, it was readily apparent that the Wicher class had severe problems: the destroyers were relatively slow, had a large silhouette with three large funnels, and were inadequately armoured. Additionally, flaws in the project's planning resulted in poorly designed watertight compartments and pipelines, which could result in the ship being immobilized after only minor damage. Also the ships suffered from poor stability due to fuel tanks being located high up on the superstructure just below the bridge. As the shipyard had absolutely no experience in building vessels of this size, there were numerous other construction flaws that were discovered only after the ship was delivered. Some of the flaws were corrected on the insistence of the Polish admiralty, but others could not be resolved.

Regardless of the many drawbacks to the Wicher class, since the purchase was based on political, rather than military needs, the Polish authorities decided to continue on and have the destroyers built. Construction of each ship took four years, almost two years more than initially planned. The steam turbines were built in Ateliers et Chantiers de la Loire in St. Nazaire, while the armament was mounted at the French marine arsenal in Cherbourg. The first ship was launched on July 10, 1928, but it was not until July 8, 1930, when she was finally commissioned by the Polish Navy in the Cherbourg harbour. She was named ORP Wicher ("gale"), in accordance with the French tradition of naming destroyers after meteorological phenomena. A week later she arrived at Gdynia and became the first modern ship of the Polish naval forces. The second ship of the class, ORP Burza ("storm"), was not finished until 1932, almost four years after the initial deadline.

ORP Wicher was sunk in the opening days of the Invasion of Poland in 1939. ORP Burza survived the war, became a museum ship and was eventually scrapped in 1977.

== Wicher-class ships ==
Construction data
Ship name	Keel laid	Launched	Commissioned	Decommissioned
ORP Wicher	February 1927	July 1928	July 1930	September 1939 (sunk)
ORP Burza	November 1927	April 1929	March 1932	June 1960

== Sources ==
- Navies in Exile by Divine, A.D., John Murray Publishers Ltd, London, 1944
