= ORP Wicher (1928) =

1928 Wicher-class destroyer

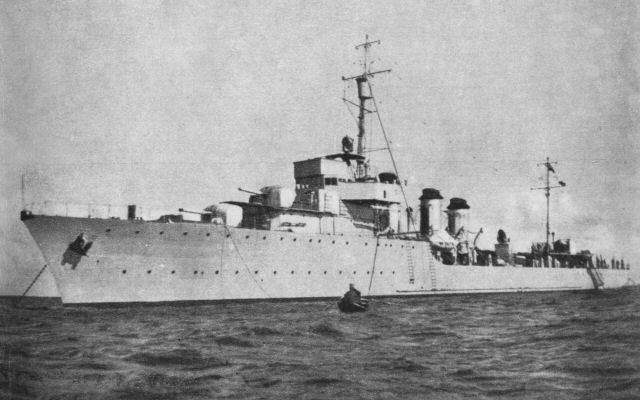
- Wicher, the lead ship of her class

History

Poland
- Name: ORP Wicher
- Namesake: Polish: Gale
- Ordered: 2 April 1926
- Builder: Chantiers Navals Français, Blainville-sur-Orne, Caen
- Laid down: 19 February 1927
- Launched: 10 July 1928
- Commissioned: 8 July 1930
- Fate: Sunk 3 September 1939
- Notes: 54°36′N 18°46′E (remnants)

General characteristics
- Class & type: Wicher-class destroyer
- Displacement: 1,540 long tons; full: 2,010 long tons
- Length: 106.9 m (351 ft)
- Beam: 10.5 m (34 ft)
- Draught: 3.5 m (11 ft)
- Speed: 33.8 knots (62.6 km/h)
- Complement: 162
- Armament: 1930: 4 × 130 mm guns; 2 × 40 mm wz. 28 AA guns; 2 × triple 550 mm/533 mm/450 mm torpedo tubes; 2 × 240 mm Thornycroft depth charge launchers; 2 × Wz BH200 depth charge launchers; 2 × 60 wz. 08 naval mines; 1939: 4 × 130 mm wz. 19/24 Schneider-Creusot Model 1924 guns; 2 × 40 mm wz. 28 Vickers-Armstrong 2 pdr Mk II AA guns; 4 × 13.2 mm wz. 30 HMGs (2x2); 2 × double 550 mm/533 mm/450 mm torpedo launchers; 2 × Wz BH200 depth charge launchers; 60 × wz. 08 naval mines

ORP Wicher, the lead ship of the Wicher class, was a Polish Navy destroyer. She saw combat in the Invasion of Poland, which began World War II in Europe. She was the flagship of the Polish Navy, sunk by German bombers on 3 September 1939.

== Pre-war history ==
The ship was built at Ateliers et Chantiers Navals Français, Blainville-sur-Orne, near Caen and construction took 4 years, almost two more than initially planned. The steam turbines were built by Ateliers et Chantiers de la Loire in St. Nazaire, while the armament was mounted in the French Marine arsenal in Cherbourg. The ship was launched on 10 July 1928, but it was not until 8 July 1930, when she was finally commissioned by the Polish Navy in Cherbourg harbour.

She was named ORP Wicher (Polish: gale), in accordance with the French tradition of naming destroyers after meteorological phenomena. A week later she arrived at Gdynia under the command of Commander Tadeusz Morgenstern-Podjazd and became the first modern ship of the Polish naval forces. Her sister ship, Burza, was started at the same time but was finished two years later, about four years after the initial deadline.

In the Interbellum Wicher served various roles, mostly political. For instance, on 15 June 1932, during the 1932 Danzig crisis, she was sent to the port of the Free City of Danzig (modern Gdańsk) to meet two British destroyers entering the port and to underline the Polish political influence in that city. In March 1931 she also sailed to Madeira, from where she brought Marshal of Poland Józef Piłsudski and his family. This passage was the greatest distance Wicher ever travelled from Poland.

She also visited Stockholm in August 1932, Leningrad in July 1934, Kiel in June 1935 and Helsinki and Tallinn the following month. In 1937, while serving as a school ship, she visited Pärnu, Narva, Vyborg, Turku, Mariehamn, Nexo, Skagen, Assens and Helsingor, as well as Tallinn and Riga.

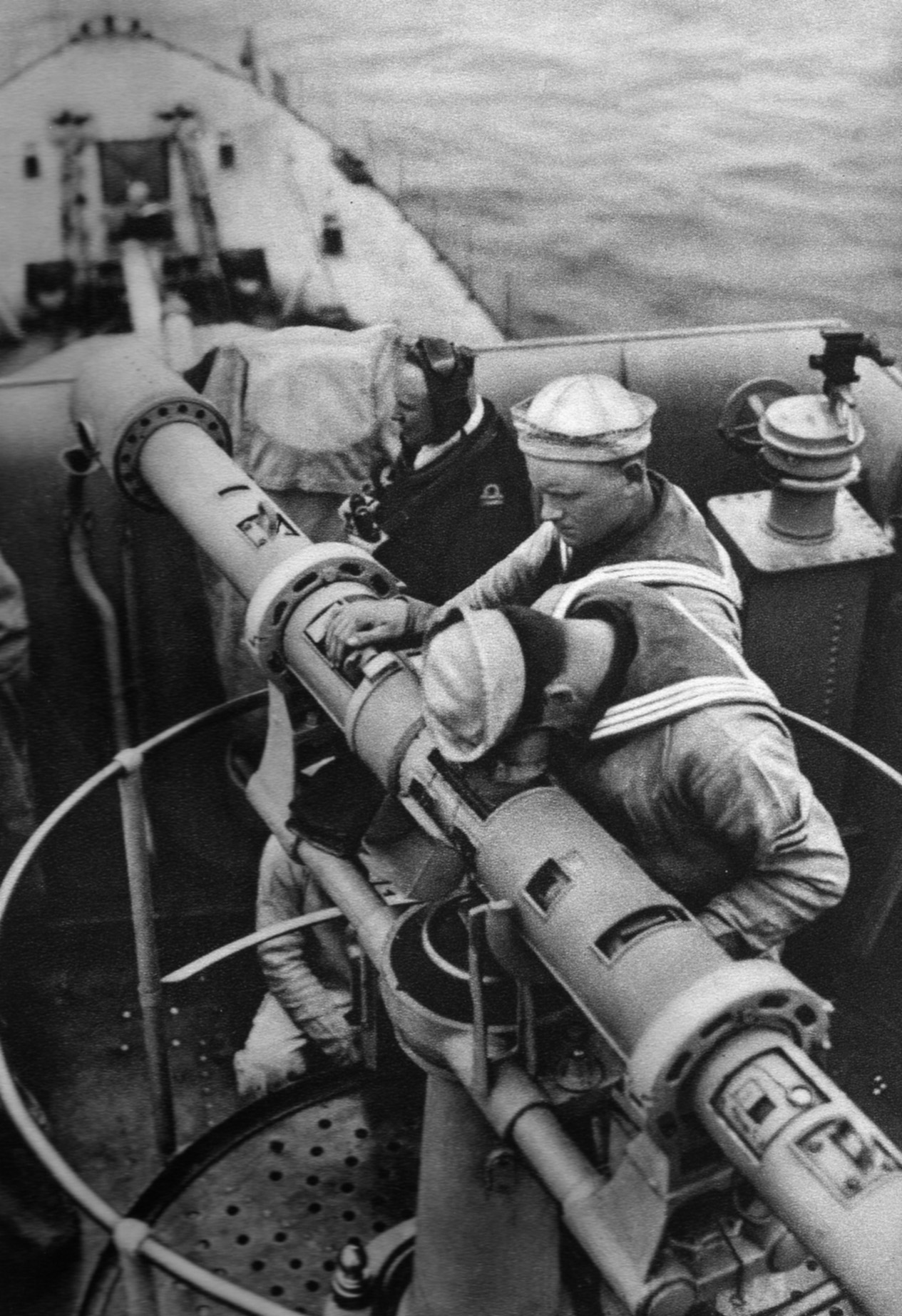
Wicher's range-finder

By the late 1930s, it was apparent that the armament was insufficient. The French naval artillery had a low rate of fire and the ship had inadequate protection against aerial bombardment. To solve the problem, in the autumn of 1935 two double 13.2 mm Hotchkiss heavy machine guns were added.

On 18 March 1939 the ship, along with the entire "Counter-torpedo Flotilla", was put on alert due to the Memel Crisis. The alert was called off a week later and the training cruises were halted. At the same time, most Polish surface vessels were prepared to be withdrawn to British ports in Operation Peking. Wicher and Gryf were the only major ships left at Gdynia harbour for the protection of the Polish shore.

== Combat ==
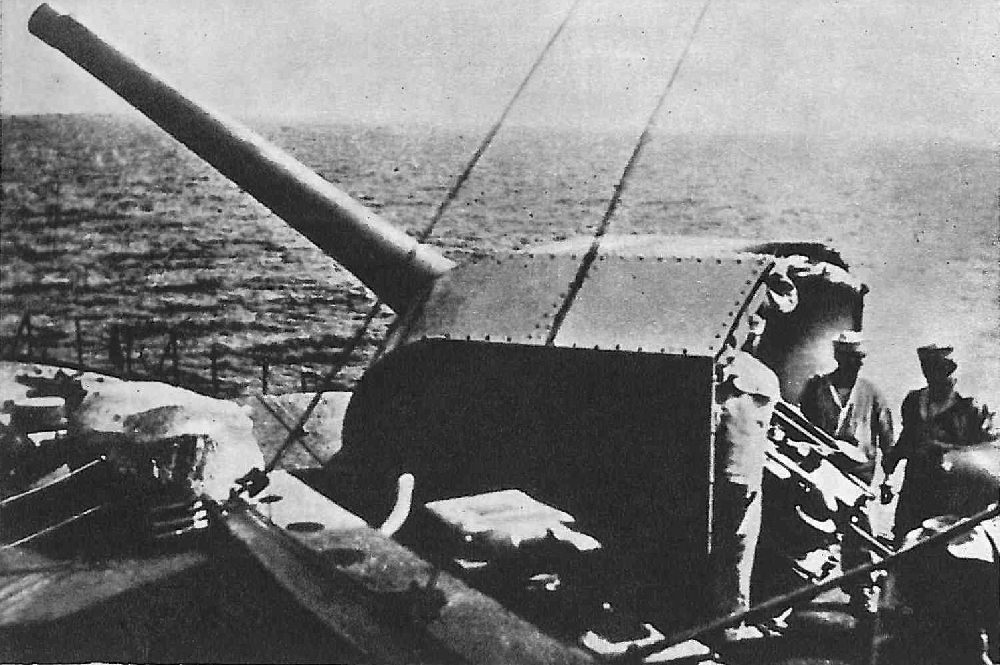
One of Wicher's main guns

After the Invasion of Poland on 1 September 1939, she repelled a bombing raid at Gdynia, after which she sailed for the Hel naval base, from where she was to commence Operation Rurka, an attempt to lay a minefield at the entrances to Gdańsk Bay. Wicher was to shield the operation, carried out by Gryf, a heavy minelayer, from the side of the German port of Pillau, assisted by six minesweepers and two gunboats. After boarding naval mines from a floating depot, Gryf and her flotilla sailed for the Hel Peninsula.

En route Wicher was attacked by a squadron of 33 Luftwaffe Ju 87B dive bombers and suffered several close misses, which caused minor damage and killed her captain. In what became known as the Battle of the Gdańsk Bay, Wicher was not hit directly, but the German planes scored several close hits, breaking all windows on the bridge and fracturing the hull in several places. After arriving at Hel harbour at 18:45, Wicher sailed for the area of operations, arriving around 22:00. Wicher's captain, Commander Stefan de Walden, did not know that the operation had been called off and in fact shielded the empty bay and not the Polish flotilla, which was anchored at Hel.

Soon after her arrival Wicher's crew sighted two German destroyers. She did not open fire on them as she did not want to draw attention to the Polish units that were meant to be operating in Gdańsk Bay. Later that night she also sighted a Leipzig-class cruiser. At about 01:00 on 2 September Wicher returned to Hel and discovered that the operation had been called off.

On the morning of 3 September 1939, while moored in a harbour, Gryf and Wicher were attacked by two German destroyers, Z1 Leberecht Maass and Z9 Wolfgang Zenker, firing at a range of 9 nautical miles. Polish warships and a shore battery repulsed the attack, with Gryf scoring two hits. After that the German squadron put up a smoke barrier and withdrew.

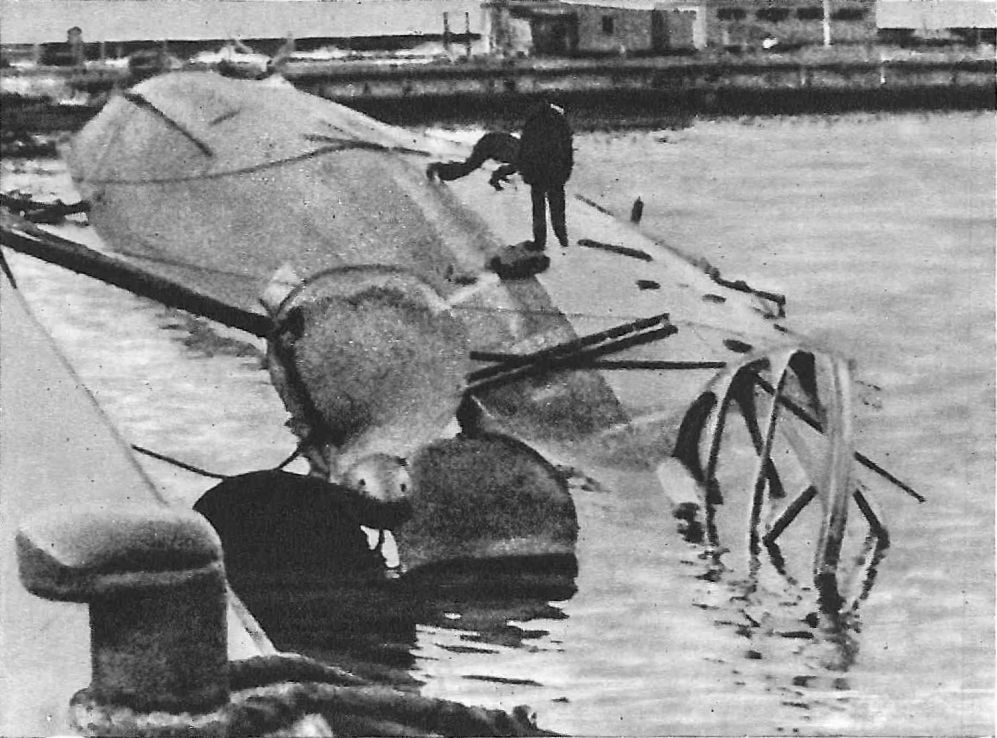
Wicher's wreck in harbour

Later that day Wicher, still in harbour, repulsed two air raids. However, in the third attack at about 15:00 she was attacked by two groups of German planes, which scored four hits. Two bombs hit her amidships, one hit the bow and the other was a near miss that fractured her hull in several places on her starboard side. Wicher started to sink and her crew made it ashore, where they joined the land defence of Pomerania. One sailor was killed and 22 wounded in the air attack.

After the end of hostilities, in November 1939 the Germans raised the wreck and towed it to shallow waters. According to some sources she was to be raised, repaired and commissioned into the Kriegsmarine under the name of Seerose. However, these plans were not carried out.

Wicher's wreck survived World War II. In 1946 she was again raised and towed out of port to the area of Jastarnia. There she served as a target for aerial bombardment practice until 1955. In 1963 she was partly scrapped. The remaining part, in approximate position 54°40′N 18°32′E, consists of a quarter of the hull, two funnels and the rudder.
