= ORP Burza =

1929 Wicher-class destroyer

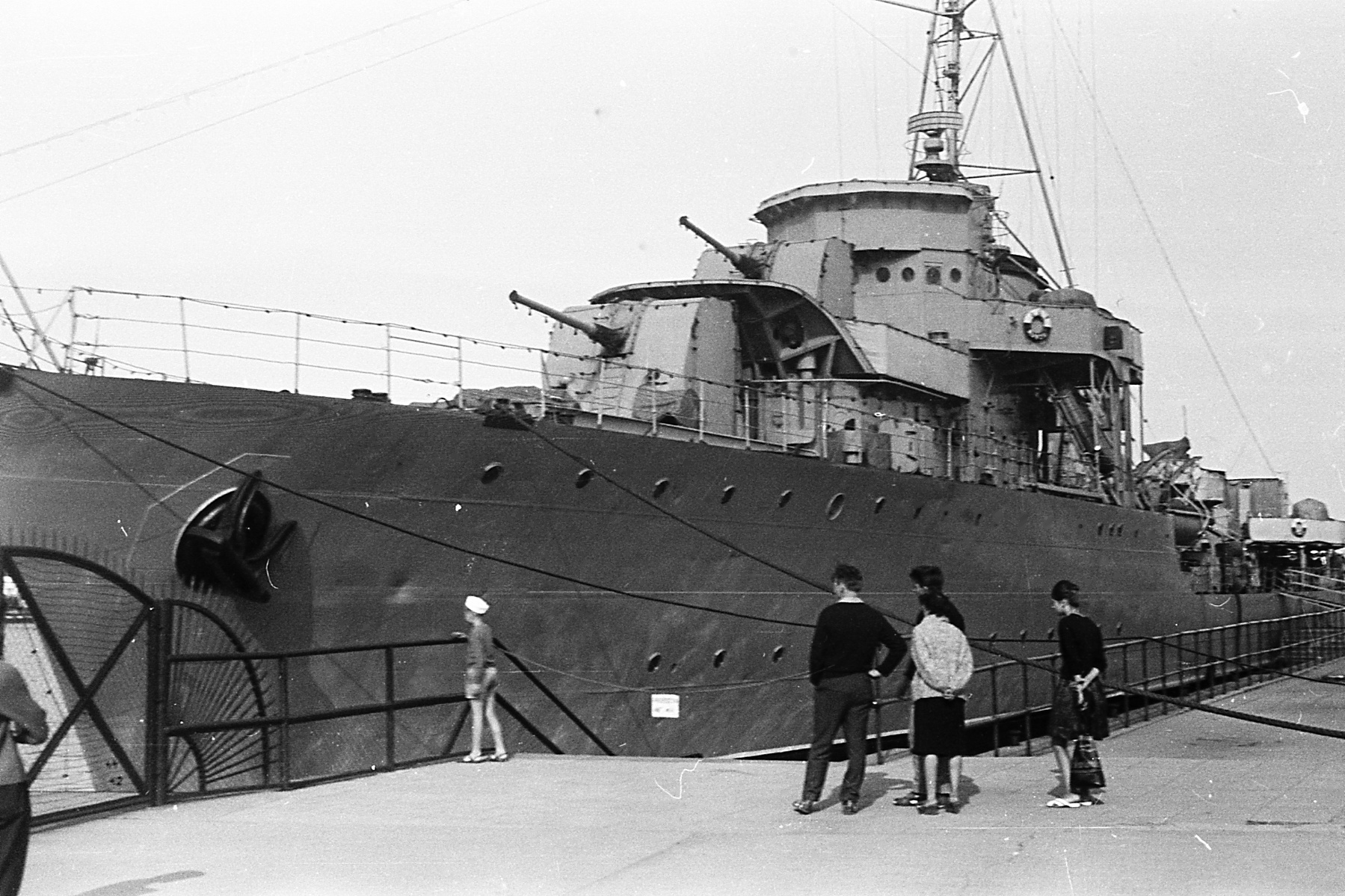
- ORP Burza as a museum ship

History

Poland
- Name: ORP Burza
- Namesake: Thunderstorm
- Ordered: 2 April 1926
- Builder: Chantiers Navals Français, Blainville
- Laid down: 1 November 1927
- Launched: 16 April 1929
- Commissioned: 10 July 1932
- Decommissioned: 28 June 1960
- Fate: Scrapped 1977

General characteristics
- Class & type: Wicher-class destroyer
- Displacement: 1400 t, std; 1910 t, full
- Length: 106.9 m (350 ft 9 in)
- Beam: 10.5 m (34 ft 5 in)
- Draft: 3.5 m (11 ft 6 in)
- Installed power: 35,000 shp (26,000 kW)
- Propulsion: Geared turbines
- Speed: 33.8 knots (62.6 km/h; 38.9 mph)
- Complement: 162
- Armament: 4 × 130 mm guns; 2 × 40 mm wz. 28 AA guns; 4 × 13.2 mm (0.52 in) guns; 2 × triple 550 mm/533 mm/450 mm torpedo tubes; 2 × 240 mm Thornycroft depth charge launchers; 2 × Wz BH200 depth charge launchers; 60 × wz. 08 naval mines

ORP Burza was a Wicher-class destroyer of the Polish Navy which saw action in World War II.

== Building ==
ORP Burza (squall or storm) was ordered on 2 April 1926 from the French shipyard Chantiers Navals Français together with her sister ship Wicher. She entered service in 1932 (about four years after the intended delivery date), and her first commander was kmdr Bolesław Sokołowski.

== Service history ==
On 30 August 1939 the Polish destroyers ORP Burza, Błyskawica and Grom were ordered to execute the Peking Plan, and the warships headed for Great Britain. On 1 September 1939 Polish destroyers met the Royal Navy destroyers HMS Wanderer and Wallace. The British ships led the Polish ships to Leith, and at night the Polish destroyers arrived at Rosyth.

In 1940 Burza supported British forces off Norway in April and in the English Channel in May. On 4 May Burza came alongside the battleship HMS Resolution and took aboard Polish survivors who had survived the sinking of ORP Grom earlier that day.

On 24 May 1940 Burza was ordered to join the Royal Navy destroyers HMS Vimiera and Wessex and shell German positions that were besieging Calais, providing support for British troops ashore. At 16.20 the Allied vessels opened fire on enemy armoured column at Sangatte Hill west of Calais. 10 minutes later they were attacked by 27 German aircraft which hit and sank Wessex. Vimiera managed to escape.

Then the entire enemy air group concentrated on the Polish destroyer. Shrapnel hits jammed her two 40 mm anti-aircraft guns. Three bombs exploded in the water, damaging her boilers and reducing her speed. Then two bombs exploded in the water near or in her bows, forcing Burza to return to Dover stern first. Midshipman Konstanti Okolow-Zubkowski serving on Burza recalled that when back at Dover, an admiral came aboard complaining that debris was being thrown over the side of the ship. The admiral, when shown the forepeak, apologised, not having realised how badly damaged Burza was.

After major repairs in Portsmouth, Burza escorted convoy HX 217 as part of Escort Group B6. While attached to Escort Group B-3, Burza escorted convoys ONS 167, HX 228, and SL 147/MKS 38. Burza was detached from ONS 167 to defend Convoy ON 166. While attached to Support Group 8, Burza escorted convoy SC 145 and the October 1943 convoy to establish British air bases in the Azores.

In 1944 Burza became a training ship. In 1945 she became a submarine tender for Polish submarines. The Polish crew left Burza in 1946, when she was transferred to the Royal Navy.

In 1951 the ship was returned to the Polish Navy and towed to Gdynia in July. Burza was overhauled and entered service in 1955. In 1960 she became a museum ship. After Błyskawica replaced her in that role she was scrapped in 1977.

== Armament ==
1932–1940:

- Four 130 mm Schneider-Creusot guns (4×1)
- Two 40 mm Vickers-Armstrongs AA cannons (2×1)
- Four 13,2 mm Hotchkiss AA machine guns (2×2), from 1935
- Six torpedo tubes 550/533 mm (2×3)
- Two depth charge launchers
- One Thornycroft depth charge thrower
- 30 mines

1940–1942:

- Four 130 mm Schneider-Creusot guns (4×1)
- One 76 mm Mk Vna gun
- Two 40 mm Vickers-Armstrongs AA cannons (2×1)
- Four 13,2 mm Hotchkiss AA machine guns (2×2)
- Eight 12,7 Vickers AA machine guns (2×4)
- Three torpedo tubes 550/533 mm (1×3)
- Two depth charge launchers
- Two Thornycroft depth charge throwers

1942–1946:

- Two 130 mm Schneider-Creusot guns (2×1)
- One 76 mm Mk Vna gun
- Four 40 mm AA Mk VIII cannons (1×4)
- Four 20 mm AA Oerlikon cannons
- Three torpedo tubes 550/533 mm (1×3)
- One hedgehog
- Two depth charge launchers
- Four Thornycroft depth charge throwers

From 1955:

- Four 100 mm guns (4×1)
- Eight 37 mm AA cannons (4×2)
- One depth charge launcher
- Four depth charge throwers

== See also ==
- List of ships of the Polish Navy

== Sources ==
- Kafka, Roger & Pepperburg, Roy L (1946). Warships of the World. Atglen: Cornell Maritime Press.
- Morison, Samuel Eliot (1975). History of United States Naval Operations in World War II, Volume I The Battle of the Atlantic 1939–1943. New York: Little, Brown and Company.
- Preston, Antony (1989). Jane's Fighting Ships of World War II. New York: Random House. ISBN 0-517-67963-9.
- Rohwer, J & Hummelchen, G (1992). Chronology of the War at Sea 1939–1945. Annapolis: Naval Institute Press. ISBN 1-55750-105-X.
