= French battleship Lorraine =

French battleship

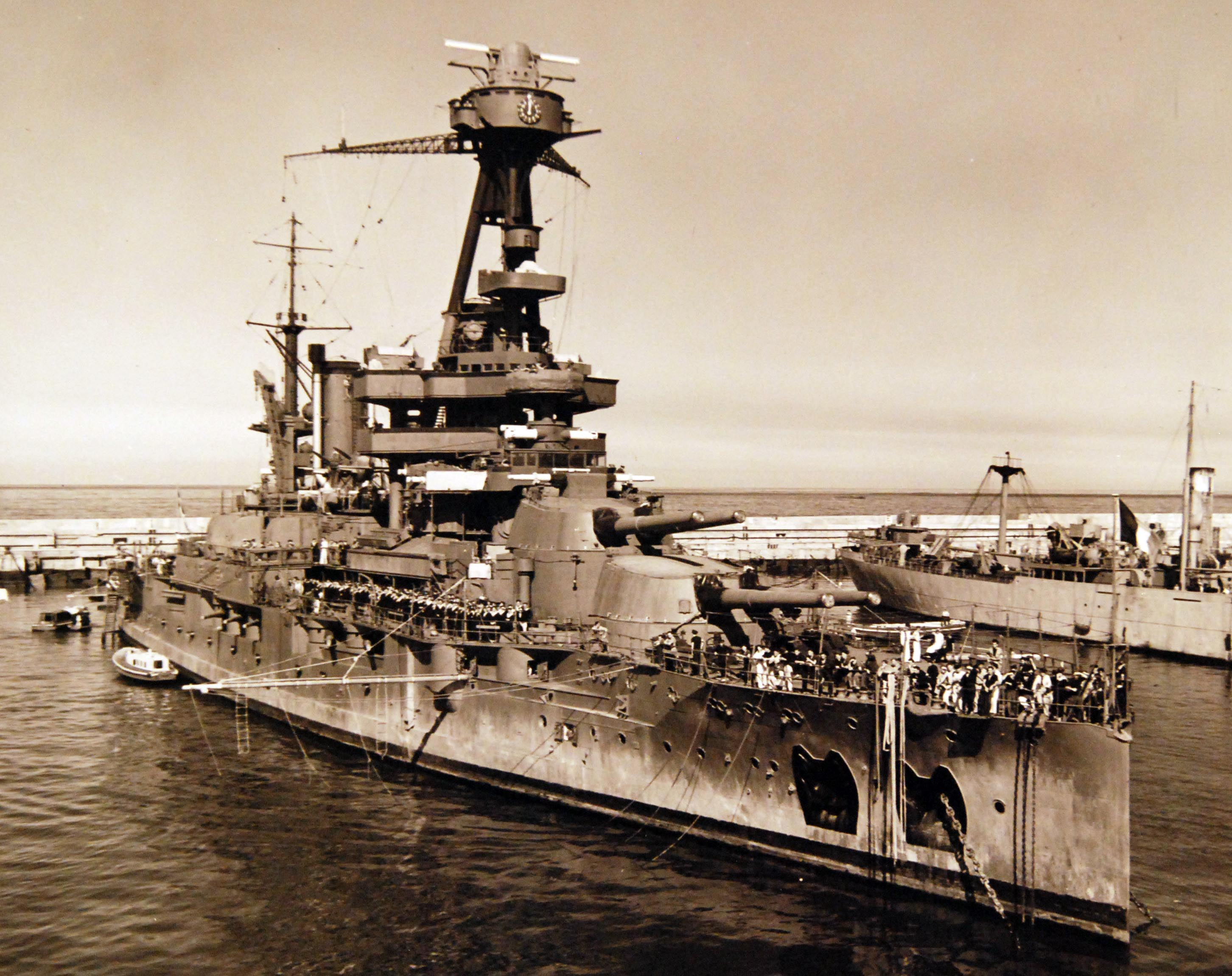
- Lorraine in Casablanca Harbor

History

France
- Namesake: Region of Lorraine
- Builder: Chantiers de Penhoët
- Laid down: 1 August 1912
- Launched: 30 September 1913
- Commissioned: 10 March 1916
- Stricken: 17 February 1953
- Fate: Scrapped, January 1954

General characteristics
- Class & type: Bretagne-class battleship
- Displacement: Normal: 23,230 metric tons (22,860 long tons); Full load: 25,000 metric tons (25,000 long tons)
- Length: 166 m (544 ft 7 in)
- Beam: 26.9 m (88 ft 3 in)
- Draft: 9.8 m (32 ft 2 in)
- Installed power: 29,000 shp (22,000 kW); 18–24 water-tube boilers
- Propulsion: 4 × shafts; 4 × Parsons steam turbines
- Speed: 20 knots (37 km/h; 23 mph)
- Range: 4,700 nmi (8,700 km; 5,400 mi) at 10 knots (19 km/h; 12 mph)
- Crew: 1124–1133
- Armament: 5 × 2 – 340mm/45 Modèle 1912 guns; 22 × 1 – 138.6 mm Mle 1910 guns; 7 × 1 – 47-millimetre (1.9 in) guns; 4 × 450 mm (17.7 in) torpedo tubes
- Armor: Belt: 140–250 mm (5.5–9.8 in); Decks: 40–70 mm (1.6–2.8 in); Conning tower: 266 mm (10.5 in); Turrets: 300 mm (11.8 in); Casemates: 160 mm (6.3 in)

Lorraine was a battleship of the French Navy built in the 1910s, named in honor of the region of Lorraine in France. She was a member of the Bretagne class, alongside her two sister ships, Bretagne and Provence. Lorraine was laid down in August 1912 at the Chantiers de Penhoët shipyard, launched in September 1913, and commissioned into the fleet in March 1916, after the outbreak of World War I. She was armed with a main battery of ten 340 mm (13.4 in) guns and had a top speed of 20 knots (37 km/h; 23 mph).

Lorraine spent the bulk of her career in the French Mediterranean Squadron. During World War I, she was stationed at Corfu to prevent the Austro-Hungarian fleet from leaving the Adriatic Sea, but she saw no action. She was modernized significantly in the 1920s and 1930s, and in 1935 her amidships 340 mm gun turret was removed and aircraft facilities were installed in its place. After the outbreak of World War II, Lorraine carried a shipment of gold from the French treasury to Bermuda before returning to operate in the Mediterranean. At the French surrender in July 1940, Lorraine was moored in Alexandria, where she was disarmed by the Royal Navy. After joining the Free French Naval Forces in December 1942, Lorraine was refitted for active service. She provided gunfire support for the landings in Operation Dragoon in August–September 1944 and bombarded German positions around La Rochelle in April 1945. After the end of the war, Lorraine was used as a gunnery training ship and then a barracks ship until late 1953, when she was stricken and sold to shipbreakers.

== Design ==
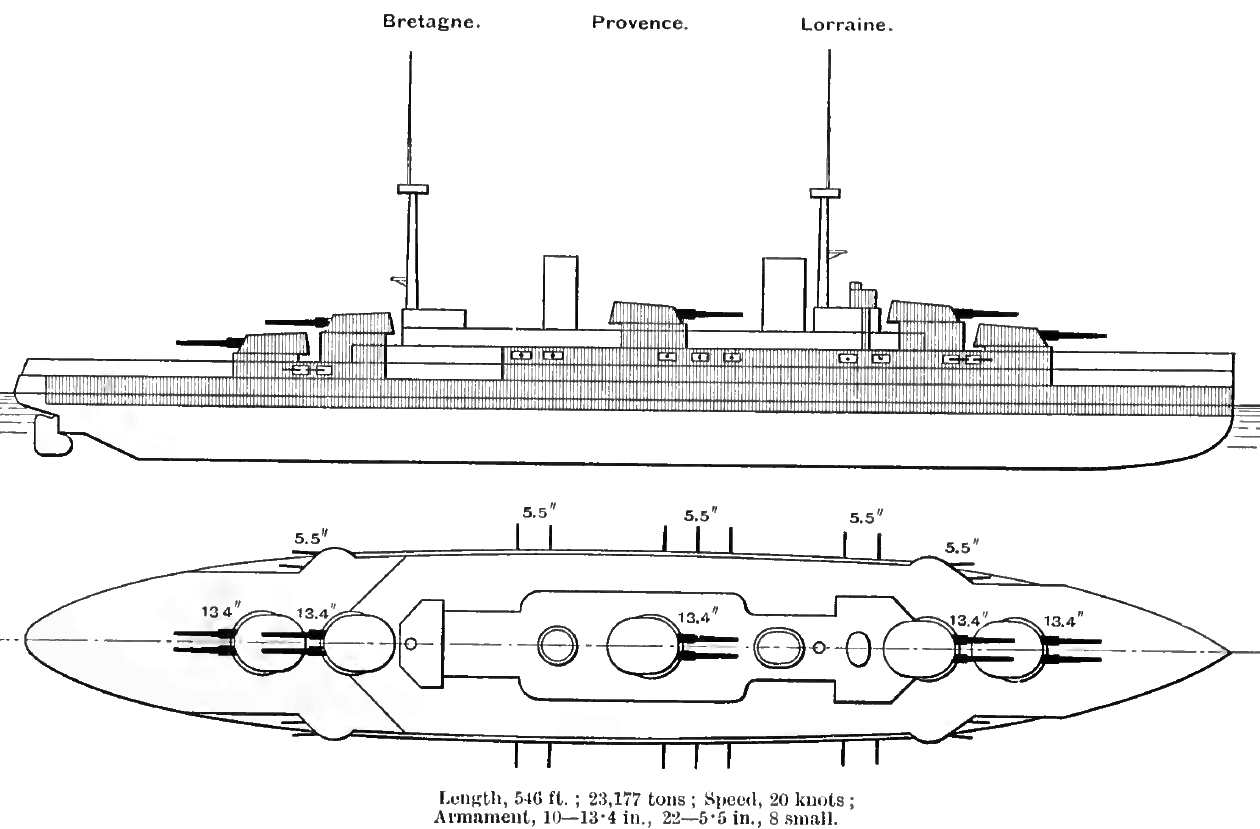
Bretagne-class design as depicted by Brassey's Naval Annual 1915

The Bretagne class was designed as an improved version of the preceding Courbet class with a more powerful armament, but the limited size of French drydocks forced the turrets to be closer to the ends of the ships, adversely affecting their seakeeping abilities.

Lorraine was 166 meters (544 ft 7 in) long overall and had a beam of 26.9 m (88 ft 3 in) and a full-load draft of 9.8 m (32 ft 2 in). She displaced 23,230 metric tons (22,860 long tons) as designed and around 25,000 metric tons (25,000 long tons; 28,000 short tons) at full load and had a crew of between 1124 and 1133 officers and enlisted men. She was powered by four Parsons steam turbines with twenty-four Guyot du Temple water-tube boilers. They were rated at 29,000 shaft horsepower (22,000 kW) and provided a top speed of 20 knots (37 km/h; 23 mph). Coal storage amounted to 2,680 t (2,640 long tons; 2,950 short tons), which provided a range of 4,700 nmi (8,700 km; 5,400 mi) at 10 knots (19 km/h; 12 mph).

Lorraine's main battery consisted of ten 340mm/45 Modèle 1912 guns mounted in five twin gun turrets, numbered from front to rear. They were placed all on the centerline; two were in a superfiring pair forward, one amidships, and the last two in a superfiring arrangement aft. As completed, however, the amidships turret did not have its guns installed until January 1917. The secondary battery consisted of twenty-two Canon de 138 mm Modèle 1910 guns in casemates along the length of the hull. She also carried seven 47 mm (1.9 in) Hotchkiss guns, two on the conning tower and one on the roof of each turret. The ship was also armed with four submerged 450 mm (17.7 in) torpedo tubes.

Her waterline belt ranged in thickness from 140 to 250 mm (5.5 to 9.8 in) and was thickest amidships. The gun turrets were protected by 300 mm (11.8 in) of armor and 160 mm (6.3 in) plates protected the casemates. The curved armored deck was 40 mm (1.6 in) thick on the flat and 70 mm (2.8 in) on the outer slopes. The conning tower had 266 mm (10.5 in) thick face and sides.

== Service ==
Lorraine was ordered on 15 July 1912, as a replacement for the battleship Liberté, which had been destroyed by a magazine explosion the previous year. She was laid down at the Chantiers de Penhoët shipyard in Saint-Nazaire on 1 August 1912 and launched on 30 September 1913. She was commissioned into the French Navy on 10 March 1916. After entering service in 1916, Lorraine and her sisters were assigned to the 1st Division of the 1st Battle Squadron. The three ships remained in the unit for the remainder of the war. They spent the majority of their time at Corfu to prevent the Austro-Hungarian fleet from attempting to break out of the Adriatic. The fleet's presence was also intended to intimidate Greece, which had become increasingly hostile to the Triple Entente. Later in the war, men were drawn from their crews for anti-submarine warfare vessels. As the Austro-Hungarians largely remained in port for the duration of the war, Lorraine saw no action during the conflict. In 1917, she returned to Toulon for a periodic refit, but apart from that voyage, she saw no time at sea for the rest of the year.

In January 1919, she went to Cattaro, where she guarded the former Austro-Hungarian Navy. She assisted in repatriating Austrian naval personnel, and escorted former Austro-Hungarian warships to France and Italy; this duty lasted until March. The French Navy intended to send Lorraine and her sister Provence to the Black Sea to join operations against the Bolsheviks, but a major mutiny prevented the operation. The two ships went to Constantinople in October 1919, where they formed the core of the Eastern Mediterranean Squadron, which operated until July 1921. Lorraine underwent her first refit starting on 10 November 1921, which lasted until 4 December 1922. After emerging from refit, Lorraine was placed in reserve, due to fiscal limitations in the post-war French Navy. She returned to service the following year—1923—with the 1st Battleship Division of the Mediterranean Fleet.

Lorraine was modernized a second time between 15 November 1924 and 4 August 1926. A third refit followed on 17 September 1929 and lasted until 6 June 1931. During these periods in dock, the range of the main battery was increased, the anti-aircraft battery was strengthened, and her boilers were replaced with newer, oil-fired models. Between 18 September 1934 and 20 September 1935, a fourth and final pre-war refit was carried out in Brest; Lorraine's amidships turret was removed, and an aircraft catapult along with a hangar for three aircraft were installed. The aircraft were initially Gourdou-Leseurre GL819 and Potez 452 seaplanes, though they were later replaced with Loire 130 flying boats. In 1936, Lorraine was transferred to the Atlantic Squadron, where she remained until the outbreak of World War II in September 1939.

=== World War II ===
After the start of World War II, Lorraine served primarily in the western Mediterranean as the flagship of Force X, under Vice Admiral Godfroy. On 4 December, Lorraine operated out of Casablanca against German surface forces, along with the cruisers Algérie, La Galissonnière, and Marseillaise, and several destroyers and submarines. During this period, she carried a shipment of gold bullion from the French treasury to Bermuda. On 1 January 1940, she was transferred to the 2nd Battleship Division of the 1st Squadron, and went into drydock for refit, which lasted until April.

On 27 April, Lorraine and her two sisters were transferred to Alexandria. On 10 June, Italy declared war on France; by that time, both Bretagne and Provence had moved back to the western Mediterranean. Lorraine was the only French capital ship in the eastern Mediterranean, though she was joined by four British battleships and an aircraft carrier. On the night of 20–21 June, Lorraine formed the center of an Anglo-French task force, with the cruisers HMS Neptune, Orion, and Achilles, for a bombardment of Italian positions at Bardia. The operation, which caused only minimal damage, was the last combined British and French naval operation before the French surrender.

Following the French surrender, the French commander, Vice Admiral Godfroy, concluded an agreement with Admiral Andrew Cunningham to demilitarize and intern the French ships in Alexandria; this included Lorraine, four cruisers, and three destroyers. In December 1942, the ship's crew decided to join the Allies in the Free French Naval Forces, and so Lorraine was placed back into service. On 3 July 1943, the ship left Suez and sailed around Africa to Dakar, stopping in Cape Town on the way. After arriving on 12 October, she was used briefly as a training ship; on 2 December, Lorraine was sent to Oran for refitting. The work included removing the aircraft facilities and installing a large number of anti-aircraft guns, including eight 75 mm (3.0 in) guns, fourteen 40 mm (1.6 in) guns, and twenty-five 20 mm (0.79 in) guns. Radar equipment was also installed on the ship.

The overhaul readied Lorraine to participate in Operation Dragoon, the Allied invasion of southern France in August 1944. On 15 August, Lorraine joined the bombardment force, Task Force 86, that supported landings. She and the American battleship USS Nevada hammered German defenses in and around Toulon, including 340 mm coastal guns that had been removed from Provence. The bombardment lasted until 21 August. Over the course of 1–13 September, Lorraine, four cruisers, and two destroyers shelled German defenses throughout the French Riviera. Among the targets Lorraine attacked were fortresses at Sospel and Castillon, along with Axis positions around Carqueiranne and Saint-Tropez. Lorraine left the bombardment area on 17 September, but remained in the western Mediterranean until she was sent to Portsmouth for a brief refit toward the end of the year. She was then sent to Cherbourg in December.

In late March 1945, Lorraine left Cherbourg to participate in her final wartime operations, codenamed Vénérable and Vermeille. In the operations, which took place in April, the French Navy focused on eliminating a pocket of German resistance in Gironde. On 14–20 April, Lorraine and several cruisers and destroyers bombarded the German "Girond-Nord" fortress in Royan in support of an attack by the French 10th Division and American 66th Division; the German defenders surrendered on the 20th. After completing the operation, Lorraine returned to Brest before being sent to Toulon. Starting in February 1947, she was used as a stationary gunnery training ship. Later, she was used as a barracks ship, until she was stricken from the naval register on 17 February 1953. She was sold on 18 December, to a French shipbreaking company, and towed to Brégaillon outside Toulon in January 1954 and broken up for scrap.
