= French destroyer Forbin (1928) =

Destroyer of the French Navy

History

France
- Name: Forbin
- Ordered: 14 April 1927
- Builder: Forges et Chantiers de la Méditerranée, Le Havre-Graville
- Laid down: 29 June 1927
- Launched: 17 July 1928
- Completed: 1 May 1930
- Stricken: 10 December 1952

General characteristics
- Class & type: L'Adroit-class destroyer
- Displacement: 1,380 t (1,360 long tons) (standard)
- Length: 107.2 m (351 ft 8 in)
- Beam: 9.9 m (32 ft 6 in)
- Draft: 3.5 m (11 ft 6 in)
- Installed power: 3 du Temple boilers; 31,000 PS (22,800 kW; 30,576 shp)
- Propulsion: 2 shafts; 2 geared steam turbines
- Speed: 33 knots (61 km/h; 38 mph)
- Range: 3,000 nmi (5,600 km; 3,500 mi) at 15 knots (28 km/h; 17 mph)
- Crew: 9 officers, 153 crewmen (wartime)
- Armament: 4 × single 130 mm (5.1 in) guns; 2 × single 37 mm (1.5 in) AA guns; 2 × triple 550 mm (21.7 in) torpedo tubes; 2 chutes and 2 throwers for 22 depth charges

The French destroyer Forbin was one of 14 L'Adroit-class destroyers built for the French Navy during the 1920s.

== Design and description ==
The L'Adroit class was a slightly enlarged and improved version of the preceding Bourrasque class. The ships had an overall length of 107.2 meters (351 ft 8 in), a beam of 9.9 meters (32 ft 6 in), and a draft of 3.5 meters (11 ft 6 in). The ships displaced 1,380 metric tons (1,360 long tons) at standard load and 2,000 metric tons (2,000 long tons) at deep load. They were powered by two geared steam turbines, each driving one propeller shaft, using steam provided by three du Temple boilers. The turbines were designed to produce 31,000 metric horsepower (22,800 kW; 30,576 shp), which would propel the ships at 33 knots (61 km/h; 38 mph). The ships carried 386 metric tons (380 long tons) of fuel oil which gave them a range of 3,000 nautical miles (5,600 km; 3,500 mi) at 15 knots (28 km/h; 17 mph).

The main armament of the L'Adroit-class ships consisted of four Canon de 130 mm Modèle 1924 guns in single mounts, one superfiring pair each fore and aft of the superstructure. Their anti-aircraft armament consisted of a pair of Canon de 37 mm Modèle 1925 guns. The ships carried two above-water triple sets of 550-millimeter (21.7 in) torpedo tubes. A pair of depth charge chutes were built into their stern; these housed a total of sixteen 200-kilogram (440 lb) depth charges. In addition two depth charge throwers were fitted for which six 100-kilogram (220 lb) depth charges were carried.

== Construction and career ==
Forbin was laid down on 29 June 1927, launched on 17 July 1928 and completed on 1 May 1930.
