= Chantiers Navals Français =

French shipbuilding company

Chantiers Navals Français was a French shipbuilding company founded in 1917 located in Blainville-sur-Orne in the port of Caen.

The company mainly built merchant ships but also built destroyers and submarines for the French Navy between 1924 and 1933 and the destroyers ORP Wicher and ORP Burza for the Polish Navy.

The yard closed in 1954.
