= Canon de 130 mm Modèle 1924 =

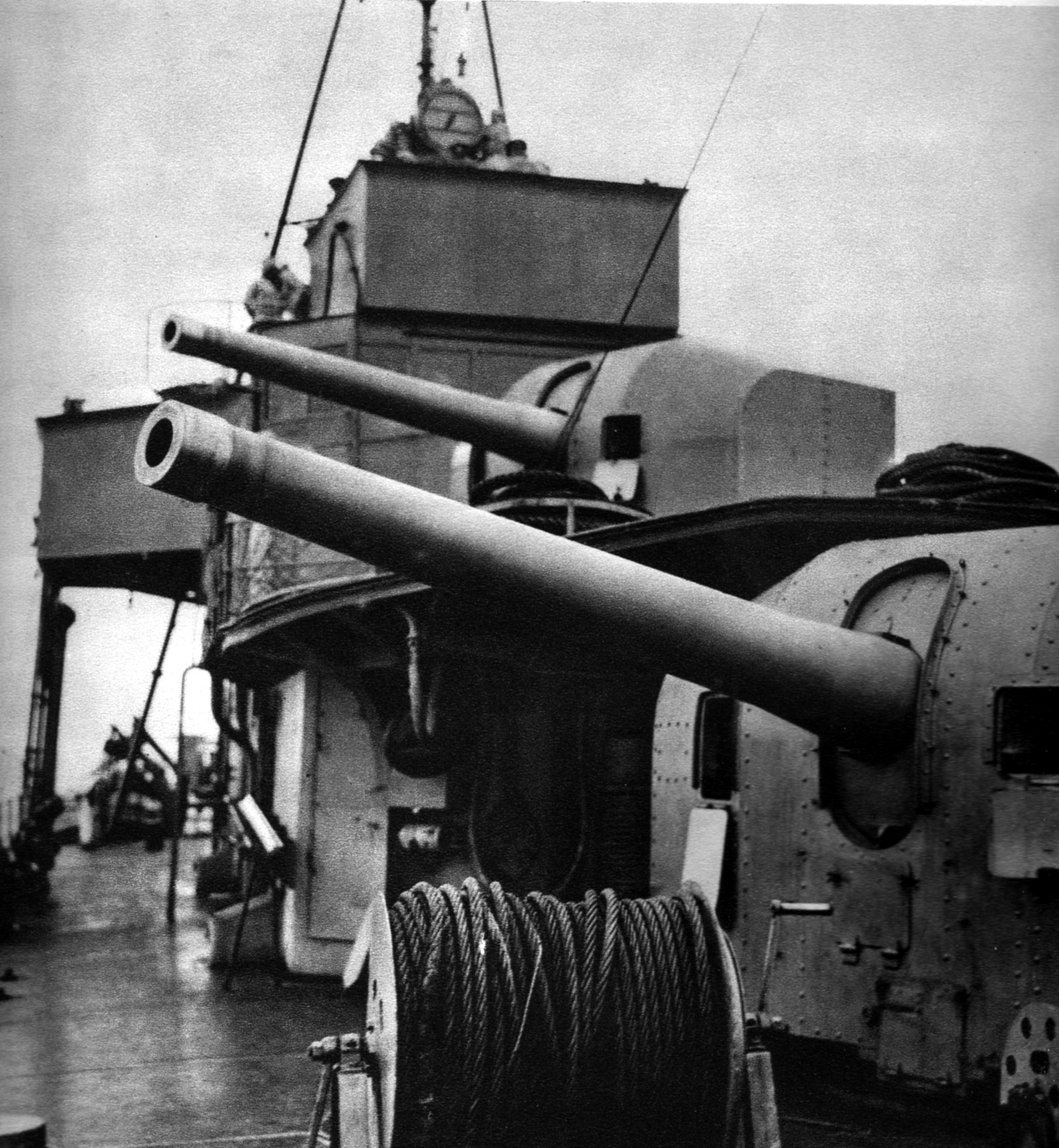
- Type: Naval gun
- Place of origin: France

Service history
- In service: World War II
- Used by: France
- Wars: World War II

Production history
- Designed: 1924

Specifications
- Mass: 3.8 metric tons
- Barrel length: 5.387 meters (17.67 ft) 40 caliber
- Shell: 130x674mm R Separate loading QF
- Shell weight: 35 kilograms (77 lb)
- Caliber: 130 millimeters (5.1 in)
- Breech: Welin breech block
- Elevation: -10° to +35°
- Rate of fire: 5-6 rpm
- Muzzle velocity: 725 meters per second (2,380 ft/s)
- Maximum firing range: 18,700 meters (20,500 yd) at 35°

The Canon de 130 mm Modèle 1924 was a medium-caliber naval gun used as the primary armament on a number of French destroyers during World War II.

== Description ==
The Canon de 130 mm Modèle 1924 had an autofretted built-up barrel and a Welin breech block. Useful life expectancy was 900 effective full charges (EFC) per barrel. These guns were carried in low-angle single turrets on destroyers. They had an automatic spring rammer, but loading was difficult at elevations over 15°.

== Ammunition ==
Ammunition was of a separate loading QF type. It was the same as that used by the earlier Canon de 130 mm Modèle 1919. The cartridge case was 674 millimetres (26.5 in) long, and together with the 7.73 kilograms (17.0 lb) propellant charge weighed 17.5 kilograms (39 lb).

The gun was able to fire:

- Semi Armour-Piercing - 32 kg (71 lb)
- High Explosive - 34.85 kg (76.8 lb)
- Illumination - Unknown

== Naval Service ==
Ship classes that carried the Canon de 130 mm Modèle 1924 include:

- L'Adroit-class destroyers
- Wicher-class destroyers - built in France for the Polish Navy
