= Naval Battle of Casablanca =

Naval engagements in WWII (Nov 1942)

- Part of Operation Torch of World War II
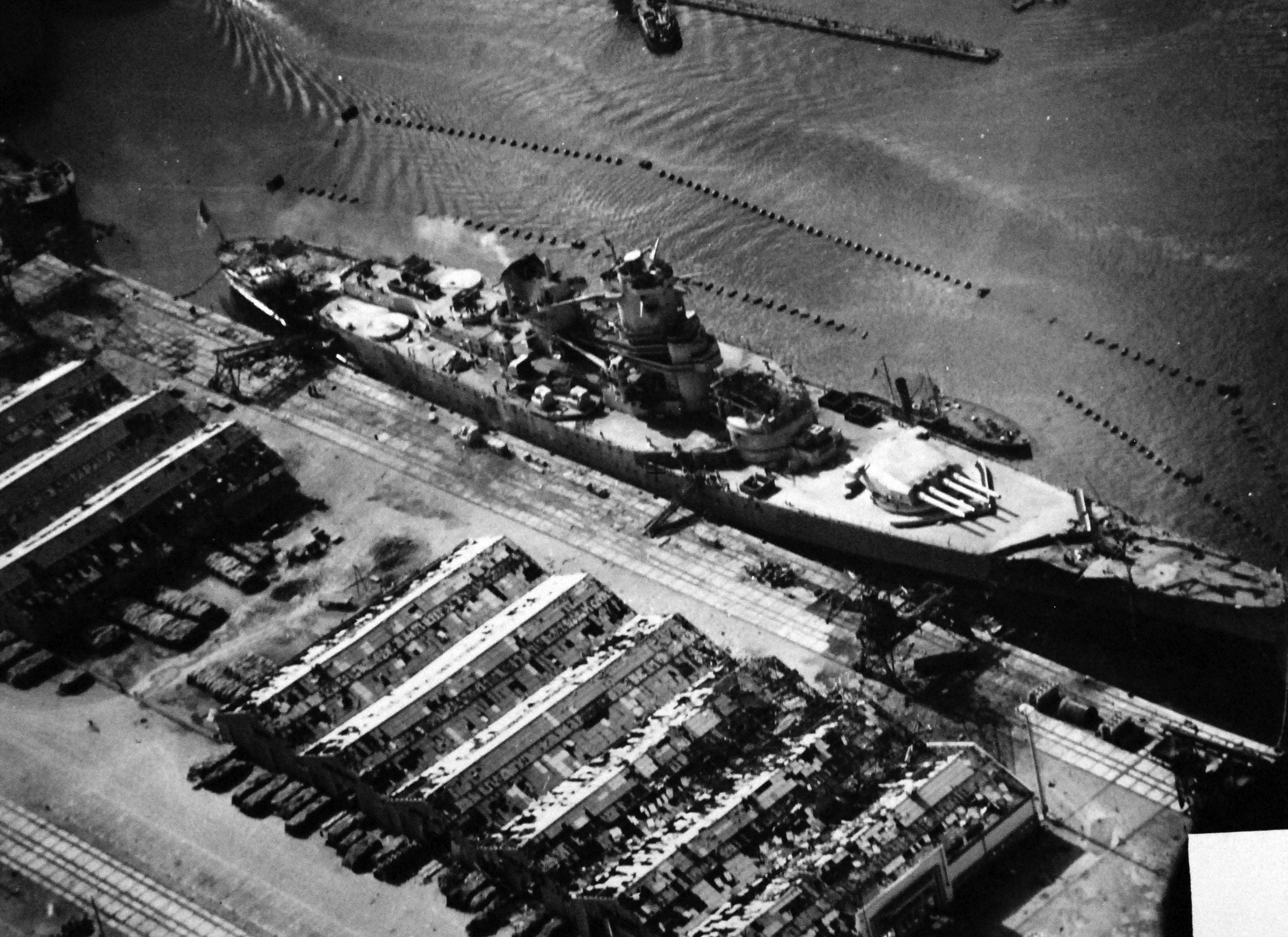
- Jean Bart under attack, circa November 1942
Date	8–16 November 1942
Location	Casablanca, Morocco
Result	American victory

Belligerents
United States	Vichy France; Germany

Commanders and leaders
Henry Hewitt	Frix Michelier; Ernst Kals

Strength
1 aircraft carrier 1 escort carrier 1 battleship 3 heavy cruisers 1 light cruiser 14 destroyers 15 troopships 347 landing craft 108 aircraft	1 battleship 1 light cruiser 2 flotilla leaders 7 destroyers 8 sloops 11 minesweepers 13 submarines 7 aircraft

Casualties and losses
174 killed 4 troopships sunk 150 landing craft sunk 5 aircraft destroyed 1 battleship damaged 1 heavy cruiser damaged 2 destroyers damaged 1 oiler damaged	462 killed 200 wounded 1 battleship damaged 1 light cruiser destroyed 4 destroyers sunk 7 submarines sunk 1 submarine scuttled 2 submarines damaged 1 destroyer grounded 2 flotilla leaders grounded 1 submarine grounded 7 aircraft destroyed

The Naval Battle of Casablanca was a series of naval engagements fought between American ships covering the invasion of North Africa and Vichy French ships defending the neutrality of French Morocco in accordance with the Second Armistice at Compiègne during World War II. Allied military planners anticipated an all-American force assigned to seize the Atlantic port city of Casablanca might be greeted as liberators. An invasion task force of 102 American ships carrying 35,000 American soldiers approached the Moroccan coast undetected under cover of darkness.

French defenders interpreted the first contacts as a diversionary raid for a major landing in Algeria; and Germany regarded the surrender of six Moroccan divisions to a small commando raiding force as a clear violation of French obligations to defend Moroccan neutrality under the Armistice of 22 June 1940 at Compiègne.

The last stages of the battle consisted of operations by German U-boats which had reached the area the same day the French troops surrendered. (Note: Robert Cressman, in his book USS Ranger: The Navy's First Flattop from Keel to Mast, 1934-1946, recounts the sinking of three troopships by U-130 on 12 November. U-130 was one of the submarines ordered to investigate early reports of invasion convoys on 2 November after sailing from France on 29 October. All were delayed by battle damage or mechanical difficulties. U-130 approached the Fedala troopship anchorage after Casablanca had surrendered by sailing along the Moroccan coast on the evening of 11 November) An escalating series of surprised responses in an atmosphere of mistrust and secrecy caused the loss of four U.S. troopships and the deaths of 462 men aboard 24 French ships opposing the invasion.

== Background ==
Morocco was a protectorate of France at the time of World War II. The French government at Vichy had surrendered to Germany after the Battle of France, signing an Armistice with Nazi Germany. General Charles de Gaulle led French forces opposed to the surrender and to the Vichy government, continuing the war on the side of the UK and the Allies. The Vichy regime—which controlled Morocco—was thus officially neutral, but in practical terms the Armistice obliged Vichy to resist any attempt to seize French territory or equipment for use against Germany. British forces had bombarded the French at Mers-el-Kébir to prevent the possibility of the French fleet from falling into German hands after the French rejected demands to join the Allies or sail to a neutral port, leading to much ill-will between France and Britain. The United States government had previously recognized the Vichy regime as legitimate. Military planning for Operation Torch in 1942 emphasized American troops in the initial landing forces on the basis of intelligence estimates they would be less vigorously opposed than British soldiers.

=== American forces ===
Troopship convoy UGF 1 left Chesapeake Bay on 23 October 1942 and was joined on 26 October by a covering force of battleships and cruisers sailing from Casco Bay and on 28 October by the aircraft carrier USS Ranger, and the escort carriers Sangamon, Suwannee, Chenango, and Santee sailing from Bermuda. These ships were screened by 38 American destroyers. The resulting Task Force 34 (TF 34) included 102 ships for the invasion of Morocco under the command of Rear Admiral Henry Kent Hewitt aboard the flagship heavy cruiser USS Augusta. As TF 34 sailed, the British submarine HMS Seraph landed Major General Mark W. Clark near Algiers to meet with pro-American French military officers stationed in Algeria. French officers shared information about defensive arrangements; but the Americans did not share critical invasion details of timing, strength and distribution of forces. No information was provided to key French leaders including Armed Forces Commander in Chief Admiral François Darlan, North African Commander in Chief General Alphonse Juin, or Moroccan Resident General Charles Noguès.

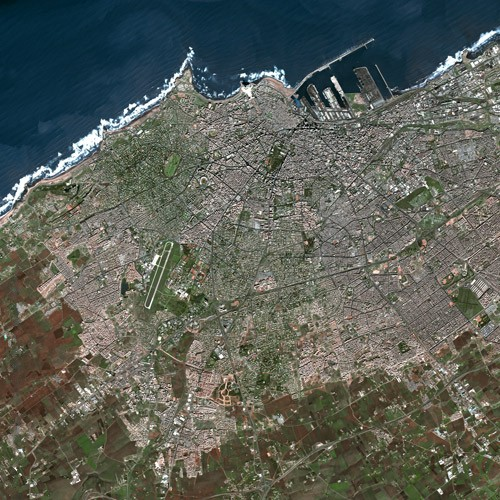
Casablanca in 2006 picture from space.

=== French forces ===
In 1942, Casablanca was the principal Vichy-controlled port on the Atlantic (all of France's Atlantic coast having been occupied by Germany since 1940) and the most important Vichy-controlled naval base after Toulon. Naval gunners manned the El Hank coastal artillery battery of four 194 mm (7.6 in) guns and four 138 mm (5.4 in) guns. One quadruple 380 mm/45 Modèle 1935 gun turret of the modern battleship Jean Bart was operational, although the battleship remained incomplete following escape from the Saint-Nazaire shipyards during the German invasion of 1940. One light cruiser, two flotilla leaders, seven destroyers (two already damaged by collision), eight sloops, 11 minesweepers, and 11 submarines were in port on the morning of 8 November.

Most French personnel attending General Clark's pre-invasion meeting were army officers. Information subsequently conveyed in pre-invasion contact with army personnel stationed in Morocco was interpreted as a request for recommendations. No pre-invasion contact has been documented with Vice Admiral Frix Michelier, who commanded naval forces responsible for the defense of Casablanca. Admiral Michelier was not yet in the confidence of North African officers in contact with the Americans, since he had been a member of the Armistice Commission until assuming his Casablanca post less than a month before the invasion.

== Prelude ==
French defenders were placed on alert status when Algerian invasion convoys were detected passing through the Strait of Gibraltar. Destinations remained unclear, and TF 34 remained undetected as it split into three groups on 7 November. Concealed by darkness, a northern group (six troopships and two cargo ships escorted by the battleship USS Texas, the light cruiser USS Savannah and six destroyers) prepared to land 9,000 troops of the 60th infantry Regiment reinforced with 65 light tanks to seize the Port Lyautey airfield; and a southern group (four troopships and two cargo ships escorted by the battleship USS New York, the light cruiser USS Philadelphia and six destroyers) prepared to land 6,500 troops of the 47th Infantry Regiment reinforced with 90 medium and light tanks near the phosphate port of Safi to cover the southern approaches to Casablanca, while the center group prepared to land the Casablanca occupation force of 19,500 troops of the 3rd Infantry Division reinforced with 79 light tanks near Fedala 15 mi (24 km) northeast of Casablanca. Naval coastal defense batteries flanked both ends of the Fedala landing beach with four 138 mm (5.4 in) guns on Pont Blondin (Note: Some references identify this eastern battery by the Arabic Chergui sometimes Anglicized as Sherki. (Willoughby, p. 210)) to the east and three 10 cm (3.9 in) and two 75 mm (3 in) guns in Fedala on the point sheltering the western end of the beach.

== Battle ==
=== 8 November ===
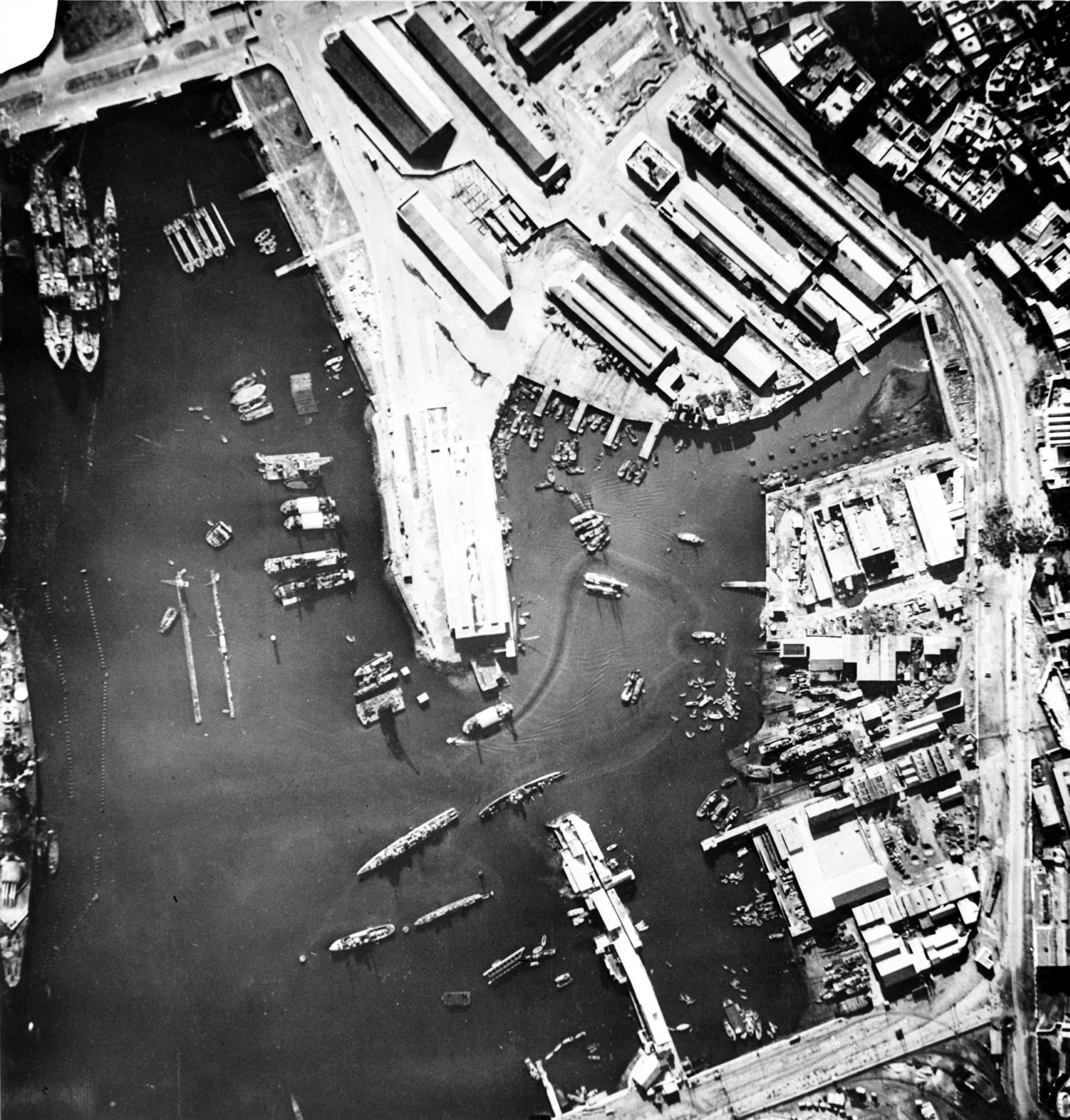
Aerial view of Casablanca harbour, 9 November. Jean Bart is at the far left. Note the sunken ships in the center.

Center group troopships USS William P. Biddle, Leonard Wood, (Note: Ship manned by United States Coast Guard crew. (Willoughby, p. 208)) Joseph T. Dickman, Tasker H. Bliss, Hugh L. Scott, Joseph Hewes, Edward Rutledge, Charles Carroll, Thomas Jefferson, Ancon, Elizabeth C. Stanton, Thurston, Arcturus, Procyon, and Oberon anchored 8 mi (7.0 nmi; 13 km) off Fedala at midnight. Loaded landing craft rendezvoused and left the line of departure at 06:00. (Note: Morocco observed Greenwich Mean Time (GMT) time; but, at 7° 35′ West, Casablanca was 30 minutes behind the prime meridian. Astronomical sunrise was 06:54 GMT on the day of the invasion. TF 34's clocks were apparently set to UTC-1. The commencement of Massachusetts's shelling of Casablanca harbor is reported as 08:04 by Auphan & Mordal, but 07:04 by USN sources Karig and Potter & Nimitz. Times specified in those references have been adjusted to GMT to conform to other references and clarify the sequence of events.) Pont Blondin coast defense batteries were alerted by the noise of landing craft engines and illuminated the beach approaches with searchlights but the searchlights were extinguished when the landing craft support boats opened fire with machine guns. The destroyer Wilkes and a scout boat tasked with marking Red Beach 2 moved out of position while maneuvering to avoid an unidentified boat evaluated as potentially hostile; and landing craft ran onto rocks while running at full speed rather than reaching their intended beach. Twenty-one of the 32 landing craft from Leonard Wood were wrecked. Eight of the ship's surviving landing craft were wrecked in heavy surf landing later waves.

3,500 American troops were ashore by dawn; but early morning mist concealed the size of the invasion force. Fedala coast defense batteries opened fire on the landing craft shortly after 07:00. At 07:20, Admiral Hewitt authorized four American destroyers supporting the landing craft to open fire on the French shore batteries. French gunners damaged the destroyers USS Ludlow and Murphy, and at 07:25 the destroyers were defended by the heavier guns of the cruisers Augusta and Brooklyn screening the troopships. Ludlow and Wilkes silenced the Pont Blondin battery, while Augusta silenced the Fedala battery. Murphy, Wainwright, and other U.S. vessels engaged two French aircraft just before 07:00 on 8 November, ultimately driving them off.

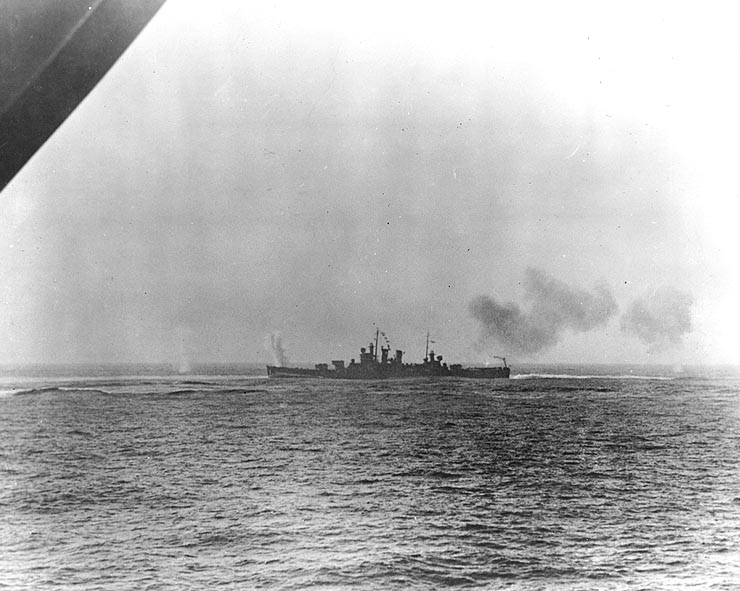
The heavy cruiser USS Wichita under fire off Casablanca.

The French submarines Amazone, Antiope, Méduse, Orphée and Sibylle sortied to defensive patrol stations at 07:00. At 07:50, French fighters rose to intercept a force of bombers from Ranger and Suwanee. The French fighters were engaged by fighters from Ranger in a dogfight that felled seven French and four or five American planes. Bombs started falling on Casablanca Harbor at 08:04. Ten civilian freighters and liners were sunk and French submarines Amphitrite, Oréade, and La Psyché were destroyed at their moorings before they could get underway. The American covering force of Massachusetts, Wichita and Tuscaloosa screened by destroyers Mayrant, Rhind, Wainwright, and Jenkins appeared offshore and Massachusetts's 16 in (406 mm) guns were added to the bombardment. The El Hank battery observed gunfire from the covering force and straddled Massachusetts with its first salvo. The operational turret aboard the incomplete battleship Jean Bart also opened fire and was targeted by Massachusetts. Jean Bart had fired only seven rounds before Massachusetts's fifth salvo jammed the turret rotating mechanism on Jean Bart. Massachusetts's heavy 16-inch projectiles caused significant damage although few actually exploded because they had been fitted with fuzes manufactured in 1918. The covering force then targeted El Hank Battery from 08:40 to 09:25.

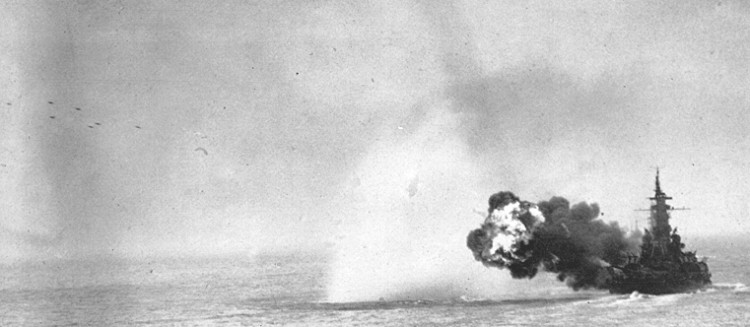
Massachusetts's nine 16-inch guns (shown firing in the Pacific) gave United States forces a significant naval artillery advantage at Casablanca.

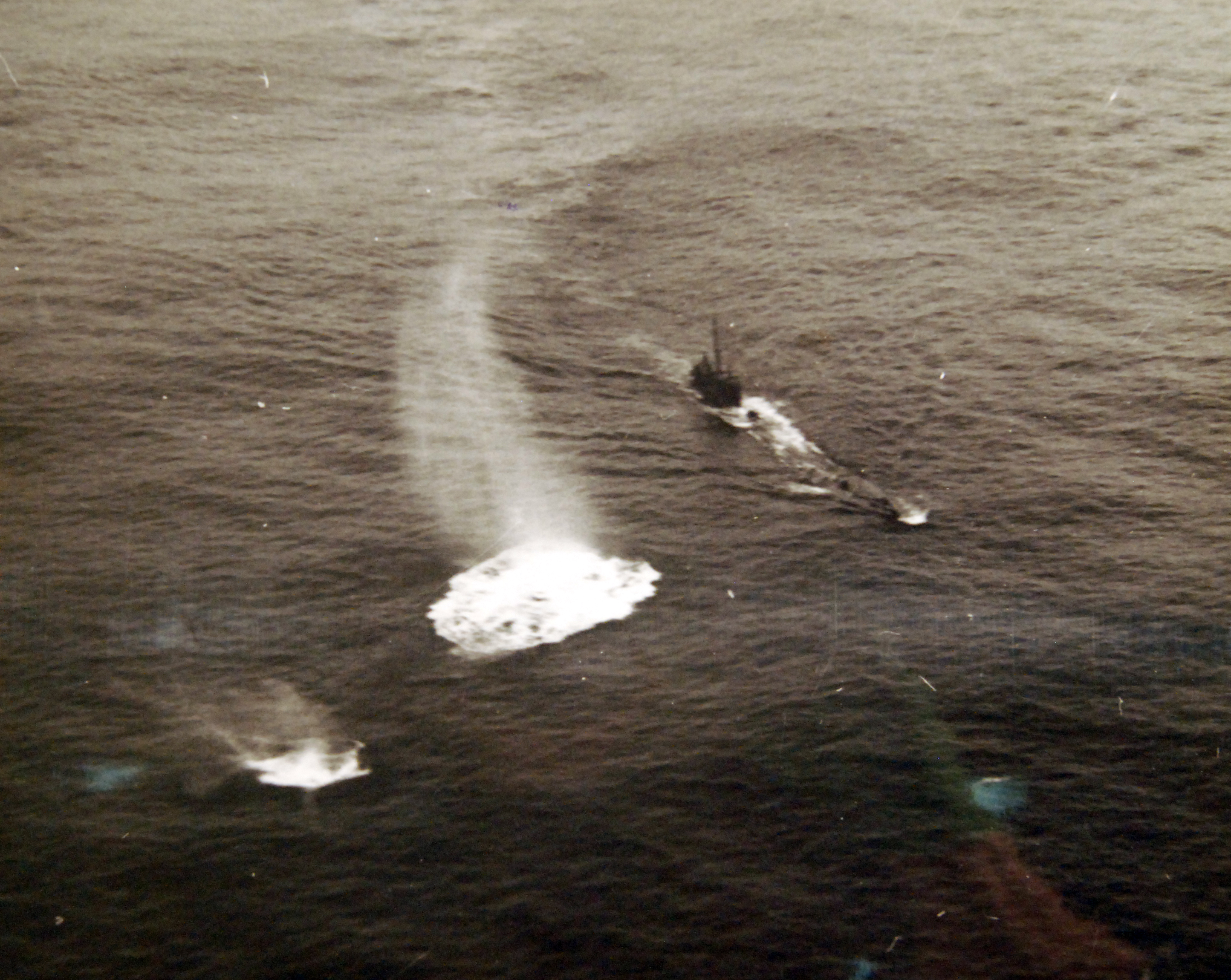
Aerial attack on a French submarine off the coast of French Morocco

While the covering force engaged El Hank Battery west of Casablanca, seven ships of the French 2nd Light Squadron sortied from Casablanca harbor at 09:00 under cover of a smoke screen to attack the troopships anchored off Fedala to the east. The French destroyer Milan sortied with destroyers Fougueux and Boulonnais. At 09:20, the French squadron was strafed by fighter planes from Ranger. French gunners sank a landing craft and scored hits on Ludlow. and one hit on Massachusetts at 10:00, causing minor damage. Milan beached after being damaged by gunfire from Wilkes, Wichita, and Tuscaloosa. Massachusetts and Tuscaloosa engaged the French destroyers Fougueux at 10:00 and Boulonnais at 10:12. Fougueux sank at 10:40. The French light cruiser Primauguet sortied with flotilla leader destroyer Albatros and destroyers Brestois and Frondeur. Engaged by Massachusetts, the Primauguet force was outgunned; Primauguet had been under refit and was not fully operational but returned fire nonetheless. The French flotilla was also engaged by Augusta and Brooklyn from 11:00 to 11:20. Albatros beached to avoid sinking. The remaining ships returned to Casablanca harbor where Primauguet beached and burnt out and the two destroyers capsized. Forty-five crew members were killed aboard Primauguet, and more than 200 more wounded. The French submarine Amazone missed Brooklyn with a salvo of torpedoes. Sibylle disappeared on a patrol station between Casablanca and Fedala, but the cause of her destruction remains uncertain. Surviving French submarines Sidi Ferruch and Le Conquérant sortied without torpedoes to avoid destruction in the harbor. Le Tonnant managed to load a few torpedoes before leaving. Augusta sank Boulonnais at noon and the only French destroyer remaining operational was L'Alcyon.

A less significant victim of this engagement was the boat in which General Patton had intended to reach the beach from the flagship Augusta. The boat had been swung out on davits in preparation for launch when muzzle blast from the cruiser's 8-inch guns blew out the bottom of the boat, causing most of Patton's luggage to be lost overboard.

Three small French warships emerged from Casablanca harbor in the early afternoon to rescue sailors from the sunken destroyer Fougueux, but the rescue ships were turned back by shellfire from the American covering force. (Note: Potter and Nimitz refer to a destroyer and two sloops, and Auphan and Mordal identify the destroyer as L'Alcyon. Cressman identifies the three ships as the 1969-ton colonial sloop La Grandiere with second class sloops La Gracieuse and Commandant Delage. La Grandiere was about the size of a destroyer with three 14 cm (5.5 in) guns and a maximum speed of 15 knots. Jane's Fighting Ships refers to the second class sloops as 20-knot, 630-ton minesweepers armed with two 9 cm (3.5 in) guns.) French planes bombed and strafed the landing beach at intervals throughout the day, but caused little damage. Workmen had repaired Jean Bart's turret by sundown, and El Hank Battery remained operational. Nearly half of the 347 American landing craft had been destroyed, and fewer than 8,000 troops had been landed. Five French submarines still stalked the invasion fleet.

=== 9 November ===
Dawn found the Fedala landing beaches lashed by 6-foot (1.8 m) waves which greatly impeded unloading the invasion troopships. Forty percent of the troops were ashore with barely one percent of their supplies. There were shortages of ammunition, and inadequate medical supplies for the wounded. Communications broke down because radio equipment was still aboard the troopships. The advance toward Casablanca halted because shore parties lacked mechanized equipment to move supplies off the landing beach.

=== 10 November ===
The French sloops Commandant Delage and La Gracieuse sortied at 10:00 to open fire on American troops advancing from Fedala to the outskirts of Casablanca. The cruiser Augusta and destroyers Edison and Tillman chased the minesweepers back into Casablanca harbor before being forced to retreat by gunfire from Jean Bart. Nine dive bombers from Ranger hit Jean Bart with two 1,000 lb (450 kg) bombs and sank her at 16:00. Jean Bart settled into the harbor mud with decks awash. French submarines Le Tonnant, Meduse and Antiope launched unsuccessful torpedo salvos at Ranger, Massachusetts and Tuscaloosa, respectively. Meduse was crippled by counterattacks and beached off Cape Blanc.

=== 11 November ===
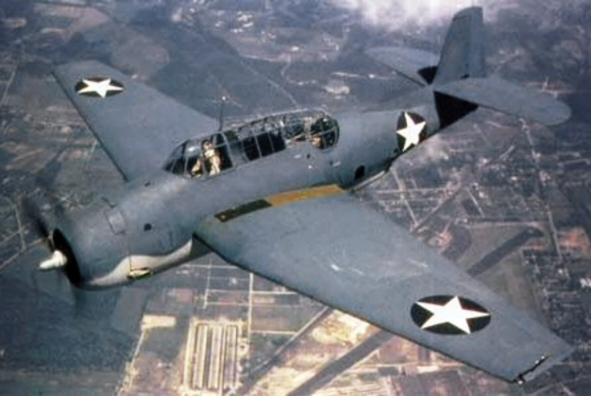
A Grumman TBF Avenger torpedo bomber, mid-1942.

Casablanca surrendered on 11 November while 11,000 tons (75 percent) of supplies for the invading troops remained aboard the troopships. That day German submarines were able to reach the troopships before they completed offloading cargo. In the early evening, U-173 torpedoed the destroyer Hambleton, the oiler Winooski and the troopship Joseph Hewes; around 100 men went down with Joseph Hewes. At this time, Bristol spotted a surfaced submarine and engaged with her deck guns and finally with depth charges, but is not believed to have sunk the French submarine. Sidi Ferruch was sunk by Grumman TBF Avenger torpedo bombers from Suwanee on 11 November.

=== Final actions ===
The invasion troopships remained in their makeshift anchorage to keep Casablanca's harbor open to unload additional troops from the anticipated arrival of convoy UGF-2 until U-130—under Ernst Kals—torpedoed the troopships Tasker H. Bliss, Hugh L. Scott, and Edward Rutledge on the evening of 12 November, killing 74 additional American servicemen; and prompting undamaged troopships to leave the anchorage and maneuver evasively at sea until they were able to moor in the lee of the Casablanca breakwater on 13 November to complete offloading supplies. Of the American ships damaged by submarine torpedoes on 11 and 12 November, all four troopships sank, but the oiler and destroyer were repaired. Surviving troopships left Casablanca when unloading was completed on 17 November. French submarines Amazone and Antiope reached Dakar, and Orphee returned to Casablanca after the city surrendered. Le Conquerant was sunk on 13 November by two VP-92 PBY Catalina flying boats off Villa Cisneros. Le Tonnant was scuttled off Cádiz on 15 November. On 16 November, U-173 was sunk off Casablanca by American destroyers.

One of Massachusetts′s 16-inch (406 mm) shells fired at the Jean-Bart, after an unexpected rebound on her berth, caused the partial collapse of the house adjoining the Ettedgui Synagogue. The defused shell proved too heavy for trolley sent to remove it, requiring a truck to be used in its stead. Reconstruction of the damaged synagogue commenced in 2011.

== Order of battle ==
=== French 2nd Light Squadron ===
Ship	Type	Displacement	Speed	Guns	Torpedoes	Notes
Primauguet	Duguay-Trouin-class light cruiser	7,249 tons	33 knots	8 × 155 mm (6.1 in)	12	Disabled by cruisers USS Augusta, USS Wichita, and USS Tuscaloosa and naval aircraft; beached and burnt out for total loss
Albatros	Aigle-class destroyer	2,441 tons	36 knots	5 × 138 mm Mle 1927 guns	6	Disabled by USS Augusta, USS Wichita, and USS Tuscaloosa and naval aircraft; beached to avoid sinking
Milan	Aigle-class destroyer	2,441 tons	36 knots	5 × 138 mm Mle 1927 guns	6	Disabled by battleship USS Massachusetts; beached to avoid sinking
Boulonnais	Adroit-class destroyer	1378 tons	33 knots	4 × 130 mm (5.1 in)	6	Sunk by USS Augusta
Brestois	Adroit-class destroyer	1378 tons	33 knots	4 × 130 mm (5.1 in)	6	Sunk by cruiser USS Brooklyn
Fougueux	Adroit-class destroyer	1378 tons	33 knots	4 × 130 mm (5.1 in)	6	Sunk by battleship USS Massachusetts
Frondeur	Adroit-class destroyer	1,378 tons	33 knots	4 × 130 mm (5.1 in)	6	Sunk by cruiser USS Brooklyn
L'Alcyon	Adroit-class destroyer	1378 tons	33 knots	4 × 130 mm (5.1 in)	6	did not sortie
Simoun	Bourrasque-class destroyer	1,319 tons	33 knots	4 × 130 mm (5.1 in)	6	repairing collision damage – did not sortie
Tempête	Bourrasque-class destroyer	1,319 tons	33 knots	4 × 130 mm (5.1 in)	6	repairing collision damage – did not sortie

=== American covering force ===
Ship	Type	Displacement	Speed	Guns	Torpedoes	Notes
Massachusetts	South Dakota-class battleship	35000 tons	28 knots	9 × 16"/45 cal 20 × 5"/38 cal	none	Damaged the incomplete and not-yet commissioned French battleship Jean Bart in gun duel, sank a floating dry dock and up to seven merchant ships in the harbor. Engaged French 2nd Light Squadron, sank at least one destroyer, assisted in engaging light cruiser and other destroyers.
Wichita	heavy cruiser	10000 tons	34 knots	9 × 8"/55 cal 8 × 5"/38 cal	none	engaged and help sink several destroyers, Damaged by a coastal battery with 14 wounded
Tuscaloosa	New Orleans-class heavy cruiser	9975 tons	32 knots	9 × 8"/55 cal 8 × 5"/25 cal	none	Engaged and help sink several destroyers
Mayrant	Benham-class destroyer	1500 tons	36 knots	4 × 5"/38 cal	16	Mayrant's gunnery officer was Franklin Delano Roosevelt Jr., son of the President of the United States
Rhind	Benham-class destroyer	1500 tons	36 knots	4 × 5"/38 cal	16	
Wainwright	Sims-class destroyer	1570 tons	38 knots	5 × 5"/38 cal	12	
Jenkins	Fletcher-class destroyer	2050 tons	37 knots	5 × 5"/38 cal	10	
Augusta	Northampton-class cruiser	9050 tons	32 knots	9 × 8"/55 cal 8 × 5"/25 cal	none	operated independently as Task Force 34 flagship
Brooklyn	Brooklyn-class cruiser	9700 tons	33 knots	15 × 6"/47 cal 8 × 5"/25 cal	(none)	assigned as escort for center group troopships engaged 2nd Light Squadron
Rowan	Benham-class destroyer	1500 tons	36 knots	4 × 5"/38 cal	16	screened center group troopships off Fedala engaged 2nd Light Squadron
Woolsey	Gleaves-class destroyer	1620 tons	37 knots	4 × 5"/38 cal	10	screened center group troopships off Fedala
Ludlow	Gleaves-class destroyer	1620 tons	37 knots	4 × 5"/38 cal	10	screened center group troopships off Fedala engaged Pont Blondin Battery engaged 2nd Light Squadron
Edison	Gleaves-class destroyer	1620 tons	37 knots	4 × 5"/38 cal	10	screened center group troopships off Fedala
Wilkes	Gleaves-class destroyer	1620 tons	37 knots	4 × 5"/38 cal	10	screened center group troopships off Fedala engaged Fedala Battery engaged 2nd Light Squadron
Swanson	Gleaves-class destroyer	1620 tons	37 knots	4 × 5"/38 cal	10	screened center group troopships off Fedala engaged Fedala Battery engaged 2nd Light Squadron
Bristol	Gleaves-class destroyer	1,620 tons	37 knots	4 × 5"/38 cal	10	screened center group troopships off Fedala
Boyle	Benson-class destroyer	1,620 tons	37 knots	4 × 5"/38 cal	5	screened center group troopships off Fedala
Murphy	Benson-class destroyer	1620 tons	37 knots	4 × 5"/38 cal	5	screened center group troopships off Fedala engaged Pont Blondin Battery
Tillman	Gleaves-class destroyer	1630 tons	37 knots	4 × 5"/38 cal	5	screened center group troopships off Fedala
Ranger	aircraft carrier	14500 tons	29 knots	8 × 5"/25 cal	(none)	provided air cover for center group while operating 130 mi (210 km) offshore of Casablanca, her bombers sank Jean Bart 10 November 42 after she was refloated from being sunk at her stern on 8 November 1942.
Suwannee	Sangamon-class escort carrier	11400 tons	18 knots	2 × 5"/51 cal	(none)	provided air cover for center group while operating 130 miles (200 km) offshore of Casablanca

== See also ==
- List of French military equipment of World War II
- Attack on Mers-el-Kébir
- Atlantic Theater aircraft carrier operations during World War II#Allied Invasion of North Africa (1942)
