= USS Tillman (DD-641) =

Gleaves-class destroyer

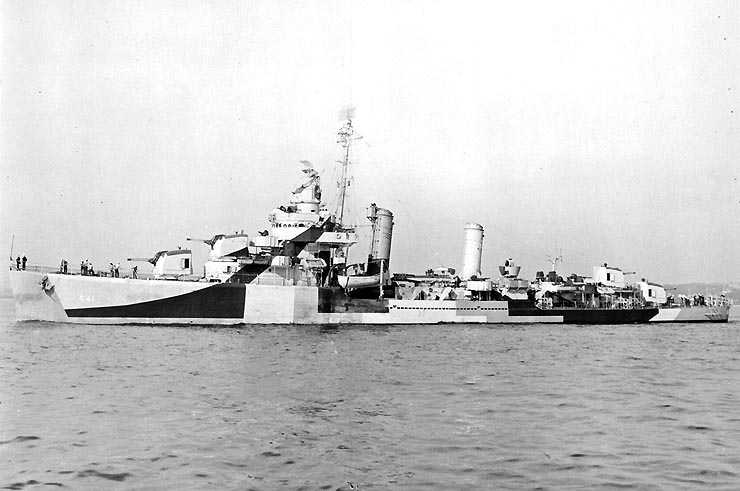
- USS Tillman off the New York Navy Yard, New York, 8 October 1944.

History

United States
- Name: USS Tillman
- Namesake: Benjamin Tillman
- Builder: Charleston Navy Yard, Charleston, South Carolina
- Laid down: 1 May 1941
- Launched: 20 December 1941
- Sponsored by: Mrs. Charles Sumner Moore
- Commissioned: 4 June 1942
- Decommissioned: 6 February 1947
- Stricken: 1 June 1970
- Fate: Sold for scrapping 8 May 1972

General characteristics
- Class & type: Gleaves-class destroyer
- Displacement: 1,630 tons
- Length: 348 ft 3 in (106.15 m)
- Beam: 36 ft 1 in (11.00 m)
- Draft: 11 ft 10 in (3.61 m)
- Propulsion: 50,000 shp (37,000 kW); 4 boilers; 2 propellers
- Speed: 37.4 knots (69 km/h)
- Range: 6,500 nmi (12,000 km; 7,500 mi) at 12 kn (22 km/h; 14 mph)
- Complement: 16 officers, 260 enlisted
- Armament: 4 × 5 in (127 mm)/38 cal. DP guns; 4 × 40 mm (1.6 in) guns; 5 × 20 mm (0.79 in) AA guns, 5 × 21 in (533 mm) torpedo tubes (5 Mark 15 torpedoes); 6 × depth charge projectors, 2 × depth charge tracks

USS Tillman (DD-641), a Gleaves-class destroyer, was the second ship of the United States Navy to be named for United States Senator Ben Tillman. In commission from 1942 to 1947, she saw service in World War II, primarily in the Atlantic and Mediterranean.

== Service history ==
=== Construction and commissioning ===
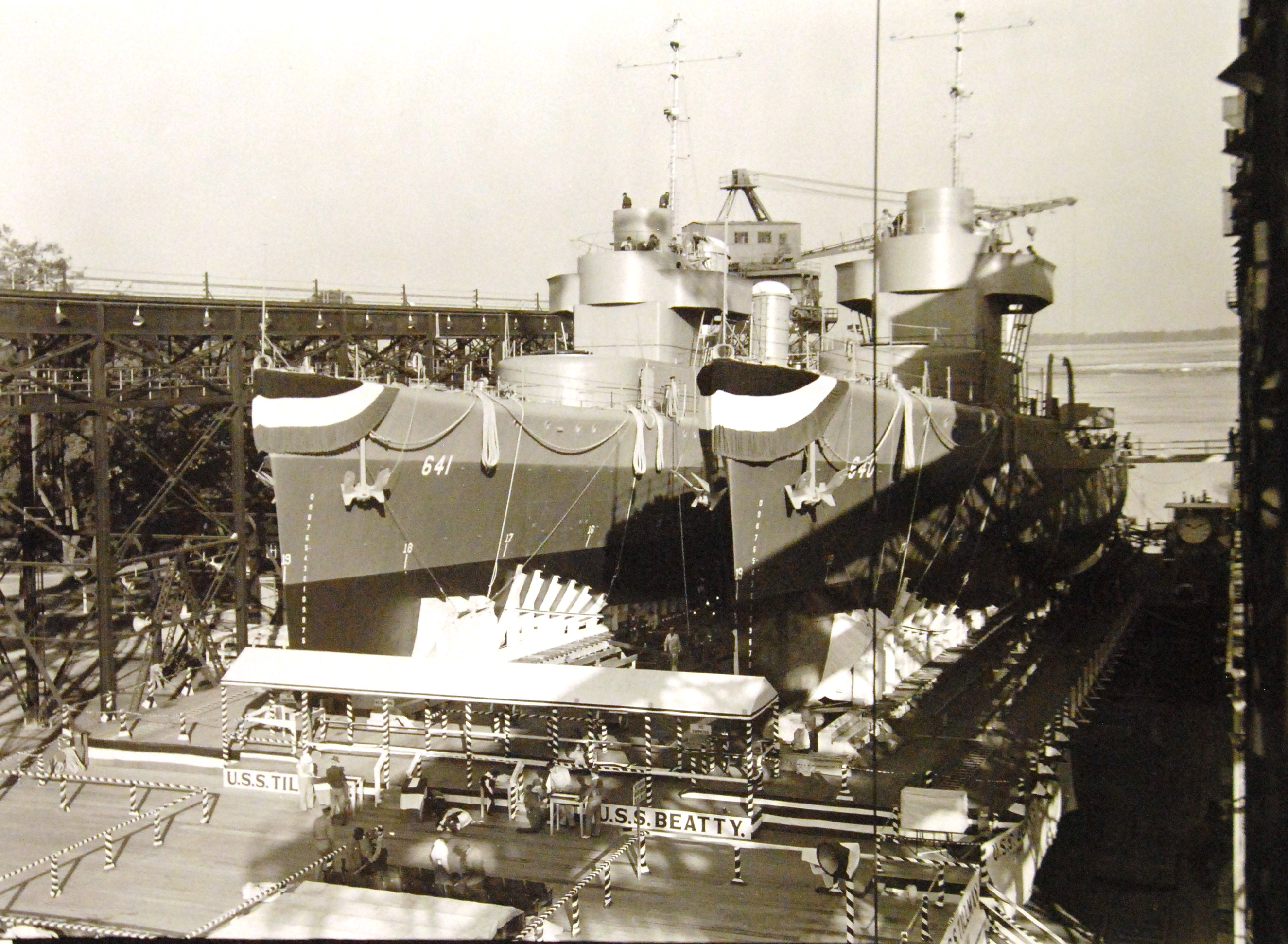
Dual launch of Tillman and Beatty

Tillman was laid down on 1 May 1941 at the Charleston Navy Yard in Charleston, South Carolina; launched on 20 December 1941, sponsored by Mrs. Charles Sumner Moore; and commissioned on 4 June 1942.

=== 1942 ===
From June until September 1942, Tillman underwent sea trials and shakedown off the United States East Coast. In September and October, the new destroyer escorted convoys and participated in exercises on the Eastern Sea Frontier before getting underway on 23 October from the Chesapeake Bay with a convoy bound for Operation Torch.

Shortly before midnight on 7 November, Tillman reached a point some 6 nautical miles (11 km; 6.9 mi) off the coast of Africa and began screening the unloading transports of the Center Attack Group during the Naval Battle of Casablanca near Fedhala. While screening off the transport area, Tillman engaged Vichy French patrol vessel W-43, which had attempted to slip six merchant ships into the transport area despite the destroyer's warnings. After coming under fire from Tillman's 5-inch (127 mm) guns, the patrol vessel exploded and beached herself. Tillman later captured three French merchant ships.

On 10 November, American troops advancing on Casablanca from the east came under fire from Vichy French destroyers. Tillman, the heavy cruiser Augusta, and the destroyer Edison attacked the French ships, at the same time drawing fire from the French shore batteries, including that at El Hank. Maneuvering at speeds of up to 34 knots (63 km/h; 39 mph), Tillman fired on the French ships, leaving one vessel steaming in circles, before she returned to her station off the transport area. On 12 November, Tillman departed the area escorting a convoy which weathered 50-to-60-foot (15 to 18 m) seas before arriving safely at New York on 1 December 1942.

=== 1943 ===
Tillman continued convoy duty in the wintry Atlantic and then participated in exercises off Casco Bay, Maine. Departing New York Harbor in the early hours of 8 February 1943, a dark night with unusually strong tides, Tillman sideswiped the paravane boom of an improperly illuminated merchant vessel anchored directly in the channel. After repairs at New York, Tillman operated on the Eastern Sea Frontier in February and March 1943, performing escort duties and participating in exercises. In the spring of 1943, Tillman protected convoys in the Atlantic and Mediterranean.

On 6 July 1943, Tillman screened the sortie from Oran of a convoy bound for Operation Husky, the invasion of Sicily. In the days that followed, she provided neutralizing fire on beach defenses and picked off artillery which menaced troops landing near Scoglitti. Before dawn on 10 July, Tillman fired her first salvo into Yellow Beach at 03:31, as the assault got underway. At 04:30, a stick of six bombs dropped by enemy aircraft exploded 300 yards (270 m) off Tillman's starboard bow, temporarily knocking out her radar. An hour later, Tillman silenced a shore battery which had been firing on Yellow Beach. Enemy aircraft, flying in low over the land where they were indiscernible by radar, harassed landing troops and supporting ships. Fear of hitting troops on the beaches forced the Allied ships to withhold their fire when aiming at the low-flying planes.

During the night of 10–11 July, Tillman patrolled off the invasion beaches. On 11 July, she repelled enemy aerial bombing attacks and supplied fire missions called in by shore observers. On 16 July, Tillman returned to Oran to guard returning transports.

During the remainder of 1943, Tillman escorted convoys in Mediterranean and Atlantic waters, experiencing many dangerous moments as she protected vulnerable merchant vessels from enemy submarines and airplanes. While en route from New York to Bizerte on 2 September 1943, one day after passing through the Strait of Gibraltar, Tillman was attacked by a Luftwaffe torpedo plane. Patchy haze limited visibility to 2,000 yards (1,800 m) when the plane, incorrectly identified as friendly, dropped torpedoes. Quick maneuvering saved Tillman from destruction by the torpedo which crossed about 30 yards (27 m) ahead and passed down her port side trailing a sinister wake. During the same attack, the destroyer Kendrick was damaged by a German torpedo. Two days later, the convoy arrived at Bizerte, but the illusion of safety in port was dispelled on 6 September 1943 by a 30-minute air attack on the harbor. Tillman engaged the attackers with her main battery and machine guns. Thirteen members of her crew were injured when a spent shell exploded on the deck of the ship.

On 6 November 1943, as she steamed off the coast of French Algeria, Tillman helped repel a German air attack on the port quarter of a convoy carrying troops and supplies for the Italian campaign. An estimated 25 German aircraft, many armed with glide bombs, took part in the raid, and sank two merchantmen and Tillman's sister ship Beatty. In the first wave of the attack, a Dornier 217 singled out Tillman as the target of her glide bomb. The radio-controlled missile came in at a terrific speed, but Tillman's machine guns splashed it in a violent explosion only 150 yards (140 m) off the destroyer's port bow. Soon after, a second glide bomb intended for Tillman's destruction splashed and exploded, again only 160 yards (150 m) away, as Tillman shot down its launching plane. A third glide bomb splashed off the ship's starboard beam as its parent craft turned back in the face of Tillman's concerted fire. During this first stage of the attack, Tillman maneuvered constantly and rapidly to evade the glide bombs. Her own safety temporarily secured, Tillman then turned her guns on planes attacking the convoy and splashed another attacker. Soon, the final and fiercest phase of the attack began as five German planes attacked Tillman. As her main battery engaged the raiders, Tillman turned left full rudder to evade torpedoes, two of which passed nearly parallel to the ship at distances of 60 and 100 feet (18 and 30 m). Moments later, as Tillman swung to port to regain her station, a heavy explosion shook the ship. This detonation, thought to have been caused by a torpedo exploding in the destroyer's wake, caused her no serious damage, and she turned to the task of rescuing survivors from the sinking merchant freighter SS Santa Elena. She then proceeded to Philippeville to disembark the survivors.

=== 1944 – 1946 ===
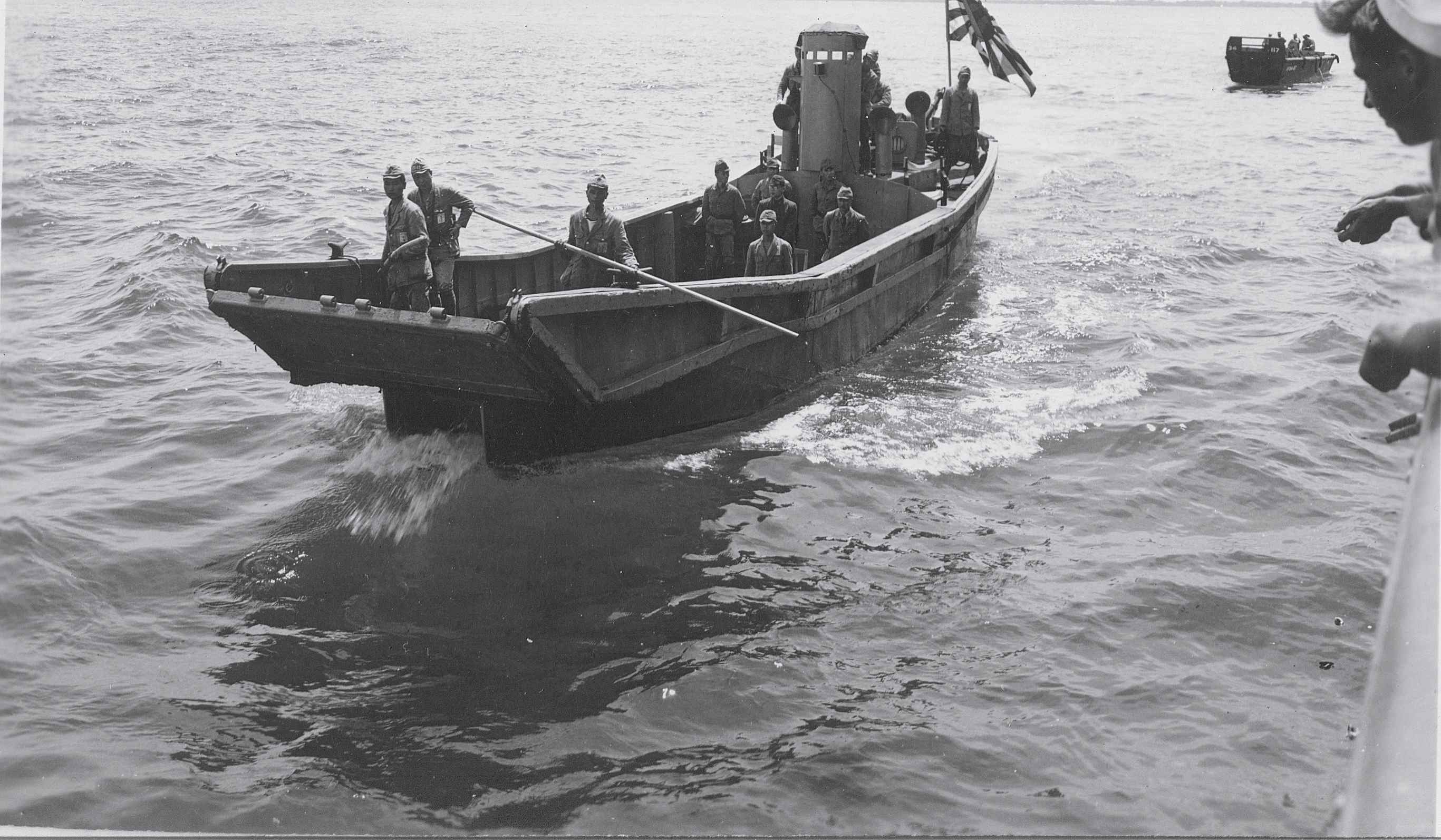
Japanese approaching Tillman in preparation for the surrendering of Yap Island

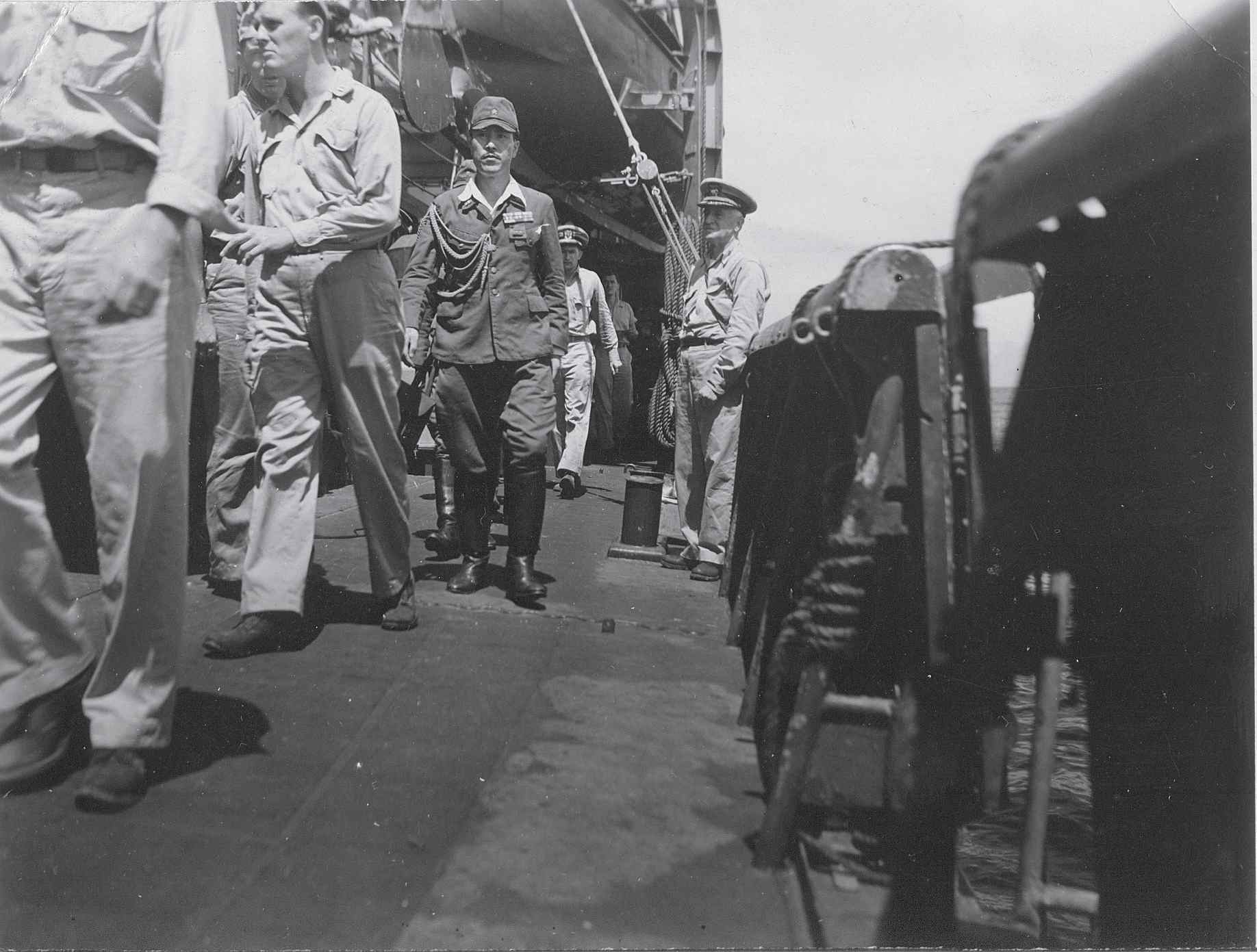
Japanese atoll commander on Tillman for the surrendering of Yap Island

During December 1943 and throughout 1944, Tillman escorted convoys between ports in the United States, the Mediterranean, and the United Kingdom. Occasionally, she varied this duty with overhaul at New York or exercises off New England. In the first three months of 1945, Tillman participated in exercises in the Caribbean and off the United States East Coast before departing on 28 March 1945 from the Delaware Bay and steaming via the Panama Canal Zone and San Diego, California, for Hawaii.

Following her arrival at Pearl Harbor on 21 April, she took part in exercises in Hawaiian waters, then departed the area on 1 May 1945. Until September 1945, Tillman performed life guard and antisubmarine picket duties, based at Guam and Ulithi Atoll. On 6 September 1945 at Tamil Harbor, the commanding officer of the Imperial Japanese Army garrison on Yap Island formally surrendered to the American atoll commander from Ulithi on board Tillman.

Tillman continued to operate in the Caroline Islands and southern Mariana Islands until 3 November 1945, when she proceeded to Pearl Harbor. Then, continuing on, she steamed via the Panama Canal to the United States East Coast, arriving at Charleston on 11 December 1946 for inactivation.

Tillman was decommissioned on 6 February 1947.

=== Final disposition ===
After over 23 years of inactivity, Tillman was struck from the Navy list on 1 June 1970. She was sold for scrapping on 8 May 1972.

== Honors and awards ==
Tillman received three battle stars for World War II service.
