= Frix Michelier =

French naval admiral (1887–1966)

- Born: 8 February 1887; Grenoble, France
- Died: 23 May 1966 (aged 79); Toulouse, France
- Military career
- Branch: French Navy
- Service years: 1907–1943
- Rank: Vice admiral
- Conflicts: World War I World War II

François Frix Michelier (8 February 1887 – 23 May 1966) was a French admiral who served in both World War I and World War II. He is best known for commanding French forces during the Naval Battle of Casablanca.

== Biography ==
In 1907, Michelier enrolled in the French Naval Academy at the age of 20. During the First World War, he held several commands and functions; Most notably, he was briefly a liaison and intelligence officer with the Royal Navy.

On 10 November 1928 Michelier was promoted to the rank of Frigate captain. He was promoted to deputy director of Military Personnel of the Fleet at the Ministry of the Navy and Colonies. On 6 March 1938 Michelier was appointed to vice-president of the French Navy technical committee and as president of the higher shipwreck commission. He was then assigned as head of fleet construction for the French Naval Ministry.

== World War II ==
On 29 September 1939 Michelier was promoted to Rear Admiral of the Navy. He then became the Secretary General of the Ministry of the Navy on 18 June 1940. During the Battle of France, Michelier along with most of the French Naval general staff were captured by the German Army in the town Rochefort. The general staff were released shortly after their capture and Michelier became a member of the French delegation to the German Armistice Commission on 1 July 1940. Later in July 1941 he became the interim president of the comminison. On 25 March 1941, Michelier was promoted to squadron vice-admiral. He was then made commander of the vichy naval forces station in Morocco and as commander and chief of the Atlantic theater of operations. He arrived in Morocco on 20 October 1941. He was placed under the direct command of the Vichy French Ministry of the Navy for all naval operations. Michelier was also placed under the command of Residents-General of Morocco Charles Noguès and served as commander of the Casablanca-Rabat sector.

=== Allied landings in North Africa ===
Michelier was warned of the upcoming Allied landing in Morocco by General Antoine Béthouart. However, Michelier and Noguès gave no credibility to the information given. He informed Noguès (who also received information from Béthouart) of the lack of confirmation of this potential Allied operation, while nevertheless knowing that a convoy is passing Gibraltar towards the east. After the landing on the 8th, Michelier coordinated the defense and did not stop the fire until 11 November. He continued resisting even after receiving a telegram from the Commander-in-Chief of the French Armed Forces Admiral François Darlan to stop resisting. Michelier believed that Darlan was already captured thereby invalidating him from issuing orders. Additionally, Michelier had received orders from Darlan two weeks earlier that he was to hold out until the end if the allies attacked. He also received information from Admiral Gabriel Auphan, the Secretary of the Navy, indicating that Vichy French leader Marshal Philippe Pétain wished for Michelier to resist an Allied invasion to the fullest extent, should one occur.

After the ceasefire, Michelier was more cooperative with the Allies, even wishing to repair both Allied and French damaged ships to resume fighting against the Germans. Under Darlan's orders, he retained the role commander in chief of the navy in the Atlantic. However, after Darlan's assassination, he was dismissed from his position and placed on leave that June. After clashes with Admiral Philippe Auboyneau in May, Free French leader Charles de Gaulle requested his replacement; Michelier was relieved of his duties on 7 July 1943 and was automatically retired in December of the same year.

== After the war ==
After the war, Michelier was brought before a French court on charges of treason, but he was able to get the case against him dismissed on the grounds that he was carrying out the orders of the Admiralty. He testified during Noguès's treason trial before the French High Court. Michelier died in 1966 in Toulouse.
