= USS Mayrant (DD-402) =

Benham-class destroyer

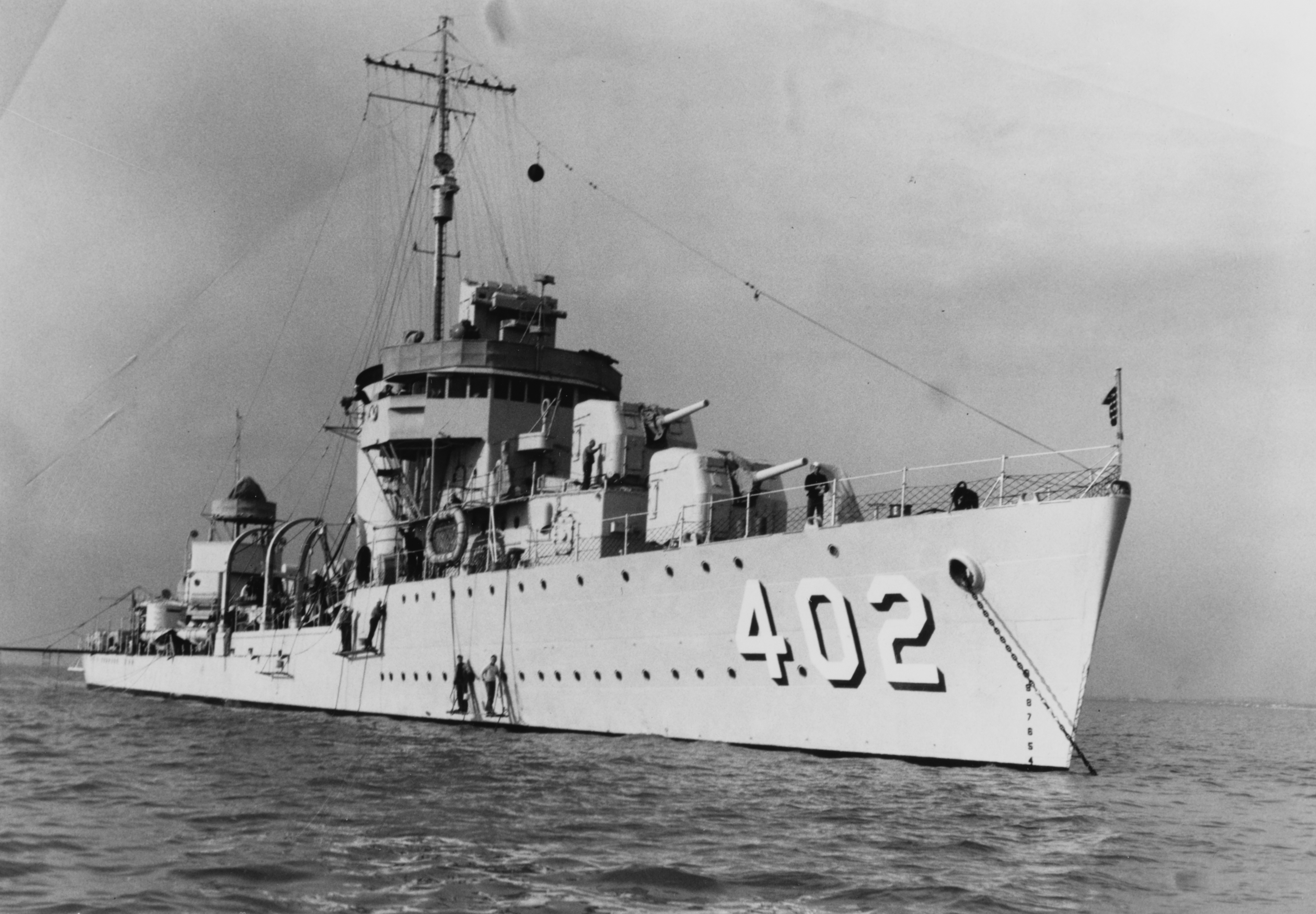
- USS Mayrant (DD-402)

History

United States
- Name: USS Mayrant
- Namesake: John Mayrant
- Builder: Boston Navy Yard
- Laid down: 15 April 1937
- Launched: 14 May 1938
- Sponsored by: Mrs. E. Sheely
- Commissioned: 13 September 1939
- Decommissioned: 28 August 1946
- Stricken: 30 April 1948
- Fate: Scuttled off Kwajalein 4 April 1948

General characteristics
- Class & type: Benham-class destroyer
- Displacement: 1,725 long tons (1,753 t)
- Length: 331 ft 1 in (100.91 m)
- Beam: 35 ft 5 in (10.80 m)
- Draft: 14 ft 4 in (4.37 m)
- Speed: 38.5 kn (71.3 km/h; 44.3 mph)
- Complement: 184 officers and enlisted
- Armament: 4 × 5 in (130 mm) Naval Gun; 16 × 21 mm (0.83 in) Torpedo Launcher

The second USS Mayrant (DD-402) was a Benham-class destroyer in the United States Navy, the second ship named for John Mayrant. Commissioned shortly before World War II, she was primarily active in the Atlantic theater of the war, and was decommissioned after being used as a target in the Operation Crossroads atomic weapons tests.

== History ==
Mayrant was laid down 15 April 1937 at the Boston Navy Yard, Boston, Massachusetts; launched 14 May 1938; sponsored by Mrs. E. Sheely, a descendant of Capt. John Mayrant; and commissioned 19 September 1939.

During the summer of 1940, after shakedown and an extended training period, Mayrant escorted her Commander in Chief, Franklin D. Roosevelt, on a tour of east coast defenses. Later on in the year, again escorting the President, she visited island bases newly acquired from Great Britain under the "destroyers for bases" agreement.

=== 1941–1942 ===
The following spring, 1941, as U.S. involvement in European hostilities increased, the Navy expanded its efforts to keep the sealanes open. In May, the limits of the neutrality patrol were extended and the Navy gradually expanded its responsibilities for transatlantic convoys. By September, it was officially responsible for protecting them as far as Iceland, lengthening the patrols of the Support Force, Atlantic Fleet, which had been assigned the task.

Mayrant, on duty with that force, operated off Newfoundland during the spring and summer. In August she stood-by during the Atlantic Charter Conferences and, at their conclusion, escorted HMS Prince of Wales, carrying Prime Minister Winston Churchill, to Great Britain.

In late October, Mayrant joined a convoy from Halifax to Cape Town. Two days out of the latter port, on 7 December 1941, she received news of the U.S. entry into the war. She then joined Royal Navy ships protecting convoys transporting British and Canadian troops to South Africa. She returned to the United States in January 1942, and for the next 5 months engaged in North Atlantic convoy duty. In April, she sailed to Scapa Flow where she joined the British Home Fleet. As a unit of that fleet she participated in operations in the Denmark Strait in search of the German battleship Tirpitz in addition to escorting several convoys on the "suicide run" to Murmansk.

Mayrant returned to the east coast in July and immediately put her experience to work conducting antisubmarine warfare training exercises in the Caribbean. Relieved of that duty in October, she resumed convoy work. She escorted troops to north Africa for the November invasions and screened the covering force for the Naval Battle of Casablanca off Casablanca 8 and 9 November. Continuing her support activities, she helped to insure the safe passage of supplies to the area into the new year, 1943.

=== Damaged off Palermo ===
Following the success of the north African invasion, Mayrant spent several months on convoy duty off the east coast, returning to north African waters in May. Passing through the Straits of Gibraltar, she arrived Mers-el Kebir, 23 May. Throughout June she cruised the north African coast from Oran to Bizerte, escorting convoys and conducting antisubmarine patrols. On 14 July, she shifted her base of operations north toward Sicily. While on anti-air patrol off Palermo, 26 July, she was attacked by Luftwaffe dive bombers.

A near miss, only a yard or two off her port bow, during this encounter caused extensive damage. Her side ruptured and her engineering space flooded, she was towed into Palermo with five dead and 18 wounded. When the engineering space of a ship is flooded, the ship usually sinks. However, heroic action of her crew, and able assistance of several other ships who pumped water and provided electric power, kept the Mayrant floating as she crawled back to harbor. Her executive officer, Franklin Delano Roosevelt, Jr., was later awarded the Silver Star for his action in saving the ship. In port, mattresses were stuffed into the holes in the ship's sides. In spite of her damage, the destroyer's secondary guns helped repel several Luftwaffe raids on Palermo during the next week. On 9 August, she was towed to Malta where temporary repairs were completed by 14 November. She then steamed to Charleston, South Carolina for extensive yard repairs.

=== 1944–1945 ===
Back in fighting trim 15 May 1944 she departed Charleston for Casco Bay, Maine. For the next year she operated primarily along the east coast, escorting new cruisers and aircraft carriers on shakedown and protecting coastal convoys. During this year she also escorted two convoys to the Mediterranean.

On patrol off New England, 5 April 1945, Mayrant went to the rescue of the cargo ship Atlantic States, torpedoed off Cape Cod Light. Despite heavy weather, the destroyer transferred members of her crew to the powerless merchantman and took her in tow. For 2 days until oceangoing tugs had her under control, they battled waves and breaking lines to keep Atlantic States from drifting and sinking.

The war in Europe drawing to a close, Mayrant transferred to the Pacific Fleet. She arrived Pearl Harbor 21 May and underwent intensive training in shore bombardment and night operations. On 2 June she sailed for Ulithi escorting convoys to Iwo Jima, Okinawa, and Saipan. After the end of hostilities, Mayrant was designated to make preliminary arrangements for the surrender of the enemy garrison on Marcus, a bypassed island in the central Pacific. With the official surrender of the island 31 August, the destroyer took up air-sea rescue operations in the Marshalls and Marianas.

== Fate ==
On 30 December, Mayrant arrived at San Diego for a brief stay before heading back to the central Pacific. Designated as test ship for Operation Crossroads, the 1946 atomic bomb tests, she arrived Bikini Atoll, Marshall Islands, 31 May 1946. Surviving the tests, but too highly contaminated, Mayrant decommissioned at Bikini 28 August 1946. She was sunk 4 April 1948 off Kwajalein and struck from the Navy Register on 30 April.

== Honors ==
Mayrant received three battle stars for World War II service.
