= USS Brooklyn (CL-40) =

Brooklyn-class light cruiser

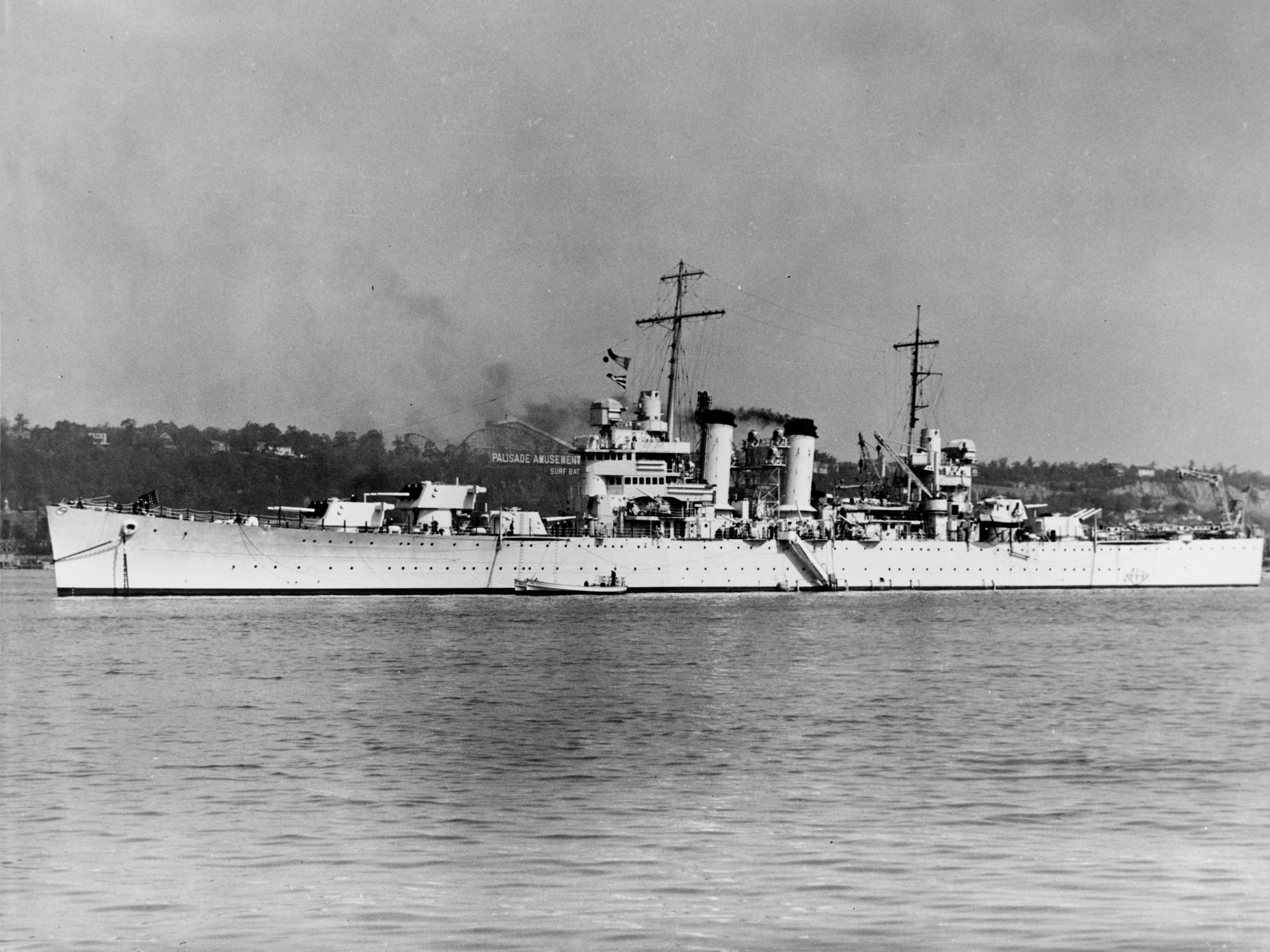
- USS Brooklyn (1939)

History

United States
- Name: Brooklyn
- Namesake: Borough of Brooklyn, New York City, New York
- Ordered: 13 February 1929
- Awarded: 3 August 1933 (date assigned to ship yard); 1 November 1933 (beginning of construction period)
- Builder: Brooklyn Navy Yard, Brooklyn, New York
- Laid down: 12 March 1935
- Launched: 30 November 1936
- Sponsored by: Miss Kathryn Jane Lackey
- Commissioned: 30 September 1937
- Decommissioned: 3 January 1947
- Stricken: 22 January 1951
- Identification: Hull symbol:CL-40; Code letters:NAKT
- Honors and awards: 4 × battle stars
- Fate: Sold to Chile in 1951

Chile
- Name: O'Higgins
- Namesake: Bernardo O'Higgins Riquelme
- Commissioned: 9 January 1951
- Decommissioned: 14 January 1992
- Identification: CL-02
- Fate: Sold for scrap in 1992; Sunk 3 November 1992, under tow to breakers in India

General characteristics (as built)
- Class & type: Brooklyn-class cruiser
- Displacement: 10,000 long tons (10,160 t) (estimated as design); 9,767 long tons (9,924 t) (standard); 12,207 long tons (12,403 t) (max)
- Length: 608 ft 4 in (185.42 m) oa; 600 ft (180 m) lwl
- Beam: 61 ft 7 in (18.77 m)
- Draft: 19 ft 9 in (6.02 m) (mean); 24 ft (7.3 m) (max)
- Installed power: 8 × Steam boilers; 100,000 shp (75,000 kW)
- Propulsion: 4 × geared turbines; 4 × screws
- Speed: 32.5 kn (37.4 mph; 60.2 km/h)
- Complement: 868 officers and enlisted
- Armament: 15 × 6 in (152 mm)/47 caliber guns (5 × 3); 8 × 5 in (127 mm)/25 caliber guns (8 × 1); 8 × .50 caliber machine guns (8 × 1)
- Armor: Belt: 3 1/4–5 in (83–127 mm); Deck: 2 in (51 mm); Barbettes: 6 in (150 mm); Turrets: 1 1/4–6 in (32–152 mm); Conning tower: 2 1/4–5 in (57–127 mm)
- Aircraft carried: 4 × floatplanes
- Aviation facilities: 2 × stern catapults

General characteristics (1945)
- Beam: 69 ft (21 m) (with blisters)
- Armament: 15 × 6 in (152 mm)/47 caliber guns (5 × 3); 8 × 5 in (127 mm)/25 caliber guns (8 × 1); 6 × quad 40 mm (1.6 in) Bofors anti-aircraft guns; 2 × twin 40 mm (1.6 in) Bofors guns; 18 × single 20 mm (0.79 in) Oerlikon anti-aircraft cannons

USS Brooklyn (CL-40) was a light cruiser, the lead ship of her class of nine, and the third United States Navy ship to bear its name. Commissioned in 1937, she served in the Atlantic during World War II, as a convoy escort and as fire support for amphibious landings.

Decommissioned in 1947, she was transferred to the Chilean Navy in 1951, where she served for another 40 years. She sank under tow to a scrapyard in 1992.

== Construction and commissioning ==
She was launched on 30 November 1936 by New York Navy Yard; sponsored by Kathryn Jane Lackey, daughter of rear admiral F. R. Lackey; and commissioned on 30 September 1937.

Designed and built under the terms of the 1922 Washington Naval Arms Limitation Treaty and the 1930 London Naval Arms Limitation Treaty, the Brooklyn-class light cruisers were authorized by Congress in 1933. The treaty restrictions, which limited the size and armament of major warships in an attempt to avoid a naval arms race, meant the light cruiser designs were kept under 10,000 tons and armed with six-inch guns. Built in response to heavily armed light cruisers laid down by the Japanese, the Brooklyn-class warships had five triple six-inch gun turrets, three forward and two aft with turrets II and IV in super-firing (mounted above turrets I and III) position. This was the same layout as the Japanese Mogami-class cruiser warships. The Brooklyn-class was also noticeable for its flush-deck hull, with its high transom and built-in hangar aft.

== United States Navy ==
=== Inter-war period ===
Following shakedown training out of Guantánamo Bay, Cuba, Brooklyn joined the fleet in the Panama Canal Zone during the latter part of 1938. She was assigned to Cruiser Division 8 (CruDiv 8) and attended to routine duties with the fleet until April 1939. In mid-April, she returned to the United States where she participated in the opening of the New York World's Fair on 30 April 1939. On 23 May, Brooklyn was ordered to the scene of the Squalus disaster, 6 mi (9.7 km) south of the Isles of Shoals, New Hampshire. Until 3 June, she acted as a base ship during the salvage and rescue operations. Brooklyn then steamed to the west coast, where she joined the Pacific Fleet and participated in the opening of the Golden Gate International Exposition on 18 February 1940. She served on the west coast until March 1941, when she departed on a good-will and training tour of the South Pacific. In May, she left Pearl Harbor for the east coast where she joined the Atlantic Squadron. From 1–7 July 1941, she escorted the convoy carrying Marines to Reykjavík, Iceland. During the remainder of 1941, Brooklyn engaged in convoy escort and Neutrality Patrol in the western Atlantic.

=== World War II ===
With the entry of the United States into World War II, Brooklyn got underway from Bermuda to patrol the Caribbean Sea. In April 1942, she was assigned convoy escort duty between the United States and the United Kingdom. On 3 September, during one of the trans-Atlantic crossings, the troopship Wakefield caught fire and was abandoned. Brooklyn rescued 1,173 troops who had been embarked on board the troopship. Although severely damaged by the fire, Wakefield was towed to safety and repaired.

On 24 October 1942, Brooklyn departed Norfolk, Virginia, for North Africa. On 8 November, she bombarded shore installations to cover the Fedhala landing of Operation Torch. Unhappily, it was later determined Brooklyn fired upon friendly troops (Seventh Infantry) before the nearby French fort surrendered. French warships then sortied from Casablanca, and Brooklyn and Augusta took destroyer Milan under fire. During the action, Brooklyn was struck by small caliber fire. Brooklyn also assisted in damaging Brestois and may have damaged the light cruiser Primauguet. Both French warships were later beached or sank from the damage. Unbeknownst to the cruisers' crew, Brooklyn was also attacked by French second-class submarine Amazone, but her torpedoes missed wide of the mark. Later in the day, Brooklyn bombarded French artillery positions near Casablanca. While engaged, she was hit by a dud projectile from a coastal gun, which damaged two of the cruiser's guns and wounded five of her crew.

Following the Naval Battle of Casablanca Brooklyn departed Casablanca for the east coast on 17 November 1942. From January–July 1943, she made three convoy escort voyages between the east coast and Casablanca and then steamed to the Mediterranean where she carried out screening and fire support duties during the invasion of Sicily (10–14 July).

Remaining in the Mediterranean, Brooklyn next covered the Anzio-Nettuno landings (22 January – 9 February 1944), also known as Operation Shingle. From 13 to 23 May, she participated in the bombardment of the Formia-Anzio area and then carried out exercises in preparation for the invasion of southern France. On 15 August, Brooklyn furnished part of the heavy naval gunfire which preceded the landing of Allied troops on the coast of southern France. She remained on duty in the Mediterranean until 21 November, when she departed Sicily for New York, arriving on 30 November.

=== Post-war ===
From December 1944 to May 1945, Brooklyn underwent extensive overhaul and alteration at New York Navy Yard. From May–September 1945, she exercised along the eastern seaboard and then reported to Philadelphia Navy Yard for her pre-inactivation overhaul. She went in commission in reserve on 30 January 1946 and out of commission in reserve on 3 January 1947.

== Chilean Navy ==
On 9 January 1951, Brooklyn was transferred under the Mutual Defense Assistance Program to Chile, where she was renamed O'Higgins after one of Chile's founding fathers, Bernardo O'Higgins, and she served for 40 years.

At 16:06 on August 12, 1974, the ship struck a submerged rock not indicated on its charts while travelling in the Smyth Channel in Patagonia. The collision caused a 64-metre (210 ft) hull rupture between frames 70 and 121, on the port side near the keel. This caused flooding and contamination of the fuel and water supplies of the ship, and damage to the propulsion and electrical machinery. Unable to make headway or be towed, the cruiser anchored overnight in the channel and was subjected to midwinter weather; 35-knot (65 km/h) winds were reported at the channel mouth. The ship's interior, lacking steam heat, continued to cool down, as damage control parties shored up the hull from inside with wooden braces and makeshift patches. The next day, the cruiser was successfully taken under tow by the escorting destroyer Almirante Williams, and they made for the anchorage at Año Nuevo Bay on Union Sound, 52 nautical miles (96 km) away. There, for two weeks, the crew gathered supplies, divers patched the hull's exterior, and engineers repaired and restarted the damaged machinery in preparation for the 1018-nautical-mile (1900 km) cruise to the naval base at Talcahuano. On September 3, the O'Higgins was again taken under tow to navigate the confined Patagonian channels, but once in the oceanic waters of Trinity Gulf on September 8, she engaged her engines at 120 rev/min and proceeded with difficulty under her own power toward Talcahuano. The cruiser arrived at Talcahuano Naval Base on the afternoon of September 11, 1974, a month after the collision. O'Higgins was subsequently repaired and returned to service.

She was sold for scrap in 1992, but foundered and sank off Pitcairn Island while under tow to shipbreakers in India. One of her turrets is preserved at the Chilean Navy base at Talcahuano.

== Awards ==
- European–African–Middle Eastern Campaign Medal with four battle stars for World War II service.
