= Operation Torch =

Allied landing operations in French North Africa during World War II

- Part of the North African campaign of World War II
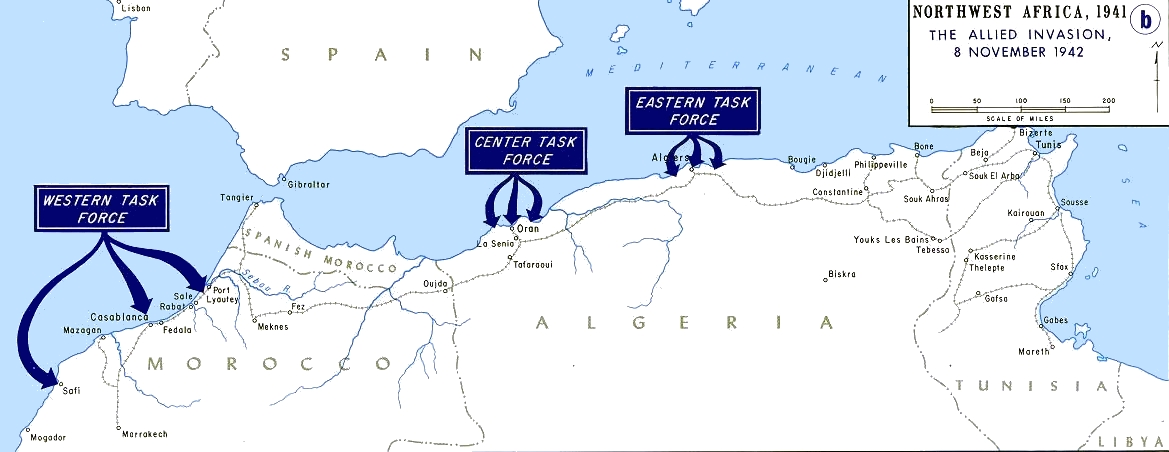
- Landings during the operation
Date	8–16 November 1942 (1 week and 1 day)
Location	French Morocco, French Algeria
Result	Allied victory
Territorial changes	Anglo-American occupation of French Morocco and French Algeria; Case Anton (Axis occupation of southern France)

Belligerents
United States; United Kingdom	Vichy France: Algeria; Morocco; Germany; Italy

Commanders and leaders
(United States) Dwight D. Eisenhower; (United States) George S. Patton; (United States) Henry Kent Hewitt; (United States) Lloyd Fredendall; (United Kingdom) Andrew Cunningham; (United Kingdom) Kenneth Anderson; François Darlan (from 14 November)	(Vichy France) François Darlan; (Vichy France) Alphonse Juin; (Vichy France) Charles Noguès; (Vichy France) Frix Michelier

Strength
Ground forces: 107,000 troops 35,000 in Morocco; 39,000 near Algiers; 33,000 near Oran; Naval activity: 108 aircraft 350 warships 500 transports	Ground forces: 125,000 troops 210 tanks 500 aircraft many shore batteries Naval forces: 1 battleship (partially armed); 10 other warships 11 submarines Germany: 42 submarines Italy: 21 submarines

Casualties and losses
United States: 556 dead 837 wounded United Kingdom: 574 dead Naval Forces: 1 escort carrier 4 destroyers 2 sloops 6 troopships 1 minesweeper 1 auxiliary anti-aircraft ship	Vichy France: 1,346+ dead 1,997 wounded 1 light cruiser 5 destroyers 6 submarines 2 flotilla leaders Germany: 8 submarines Italy: 2 submarines

Operation Torch (8–16 November 1942) was an Allied invasion of French North Africa during World War II. Torch was a compromise operation that met the British objective of securing victory in North Africa while allowing American armed forces the opportunity to begin their fight against Nazi Germany and Fascist Italy on a limited scale.

The French colonies were aligned with Germany via Vichy France but the loyalties of the population were mixed. Reports indicated that they might support the Allies. The American General Dwight D. Eisenhower, supreme commander of the Allied forces in Mediterranean theater of the war, approved plans for a three-pronged attack on Casablanca (Western), Oran (Centre) and Algiers (Eastern), then a rapid move on Tunis to catch Axis forces in North Africa from the west in conjunction with the British advance from Egypt.

The Western Task Force encountered unexpected resistance and bad weather but Casablanca, the principal French Atlantic naval base, was captured after a short siege. The Centre Task Force suffered some damage to its ships when trying to land in shallow water; Oran surrendered after bombardment by British battleships. The Eastern Task Force met less opposition and were able to push inland and compel surrender on the first day.

The success of Torch caused Admiral François Darlan, commander of the Vichy French forces, who was in Algiers, to order co-operation with the Allies, in return for being installed as High Commissioner, with many other Vichy officials keeping their jobs. Darlan was assassinated by a monarchist six weeks later and the Free French gradually came to dominate the government.

== Background ==
=== Allied strategy ===
When the United States entered the Second World War on December 7, 1941, British and Americans met at the Arcadia Conference in Washington D.C. to discuss future strategy. The principle of Europe first (Germany first) was agreed upon, but British and Americans had different views on how to implement it. Americans favoured a direct approach with first a limited landing in Europe in 1942 (Operation Sledgehammer), and then a follow-up main thrust in 1943 (Operation Roundup). The British pressed for a less ambitious plan. They realized the build-up of American forces (Operation Bolero) would take time, and there was not enough shipping available for large operations. Winston Churchill proposed to invade North Africa. The head of the United States Army, General George Marshall and the head of the US Navy, Admiral Ernest King strongly opposed that plan, and were inclined to abandon the Germany first strategy if Churchill persisted. But President Franklin D. Roosevelt wanted to support the Soviets and as any Pacific operation would be of no help to them, he agreed to the North-African operation. On 14 August 1942 Lt. General Dwight D. Eisenhower was appointed as Commander in Chief Allied expeditionary Force, and he set up his headquarters in London.

Planners identified Oran, Algiers and Casablanca as key targets. Ideally there would also be a landing at Tunis to secure Tunisia and facilitate the rapid interdiction of supplies travelling via Tripoli to Erwin Rommel's Afrika Korps forces in Italian Libya. A compromise would be to land at Bône in eastern Algeria, some 300 miles (480 km) closer to Tunis than Algiers. Limited resources dictated that the Allies could only make three landings and Eisenhower, who believed that any plan must include landings at Oran and Algiers, had two main options: either the western option, to land at Casablanca, Oran and Algiers and then make as rapid a move as possible to Tunis some 500 miles (800 km) east of Algiers once the Vichy opposition was suppressed; or the eastern option, to land at Oran, Algiers and Bône and then advance overland to Casablanca some 500 miles (800 km) west of Oran. He favoured the eastern option because of the advantages it gave to an early capture of Tunis and also because the Atlantic swells off Casablanca presented considerably greater risks to an amphibious landing there than would be encountered in the Mediterranean. The Combined Chiefs of Staff, however, were concerned that should Operation Torch precipitate Spain to abandon neutrality and join the Axis, the Straits of Gibraltar could be closed cutting the entire Allied force's lines of communication. They therefore chose the Casablanca option as the less risky since the forces in Algeria and Tunisia could be supplied overland from Casablanca in the event of closure of the straits.

The Morocco landings ruled out the early occupation of Tunisia. But with British forces advancing from Egypt, this would allow the Allies to carry out a pincer operation against Axis forces in North Africa by mid-January 1943.

=== Intrigues with Vichy commanders ===
The Allies believed that the Vichy French Armistice Army would not fight, partly because of information supplied by the American Consul Robert Daniel Murphy in Algiers. The French were former members of the Allies, and US troops were instructed not to fire unless they were fired upon. The Vichy French Navy were expected to be very hostile after the British Attack on Mers-el-Kébir in June 1940, and the Syria–Lebanon campaign in 1941.

Allied military strategists needed to consider the political situation in North Africa. The Americans had recognised Pétain and the Vichy government in 1940, whereas the British did not and had recognised General Charles de Gaulle's French National Committee as a government-in-exile instead. After his backing of British operations against the Vichy French in Dakar and Syria, de Gaulle did not have many supporters in North Africa. Hence the Allies decided to keep de Gaulle and his Free French Forces entirely out of the operation.

To gauge the feeling of the Vichy French forces, Murphy was appointed to the American consulate in Algeria. His covert mission was to determine the mood of the French forces and to make contact with elements that might support an Allied invasion. He succeeded in contacting several French officers, including General Charles Mast, the French commander-in-chief in Algiers. These officers were willing to support the Allies but asked for a clandestine conference with a senior Allied general in Algeria. Major General Mark W. Clark, one of Eisenhower's senior commanders, was secretly dispatched to Cherchell in Algeria aboard the British submarine HMS Seraph and met with these Vichy French officers on 21 October 1942. Due to the need to maintain secrecy, the French officers were left in the dark about concrete plans, but they gave Clark detailed information about the military situation in Algiers. These officers also asked French General Henri Giraud be moved out of Vichy France to take the lead of the operation.

Eventually the Allies succeeded in slipping Giraud out of Vichy France on HMS Seraph to Gibraltar, where Eisenhower had his headquarters, intending to offer him the post of commander in chief of French forces in North Africa after the invasion. However, Giraud would take no position lower than commander in chief of all the invading forces. When he was refused, he decided to remain "a spectator in this affair".

== Forces ==
=== Allied forces ===
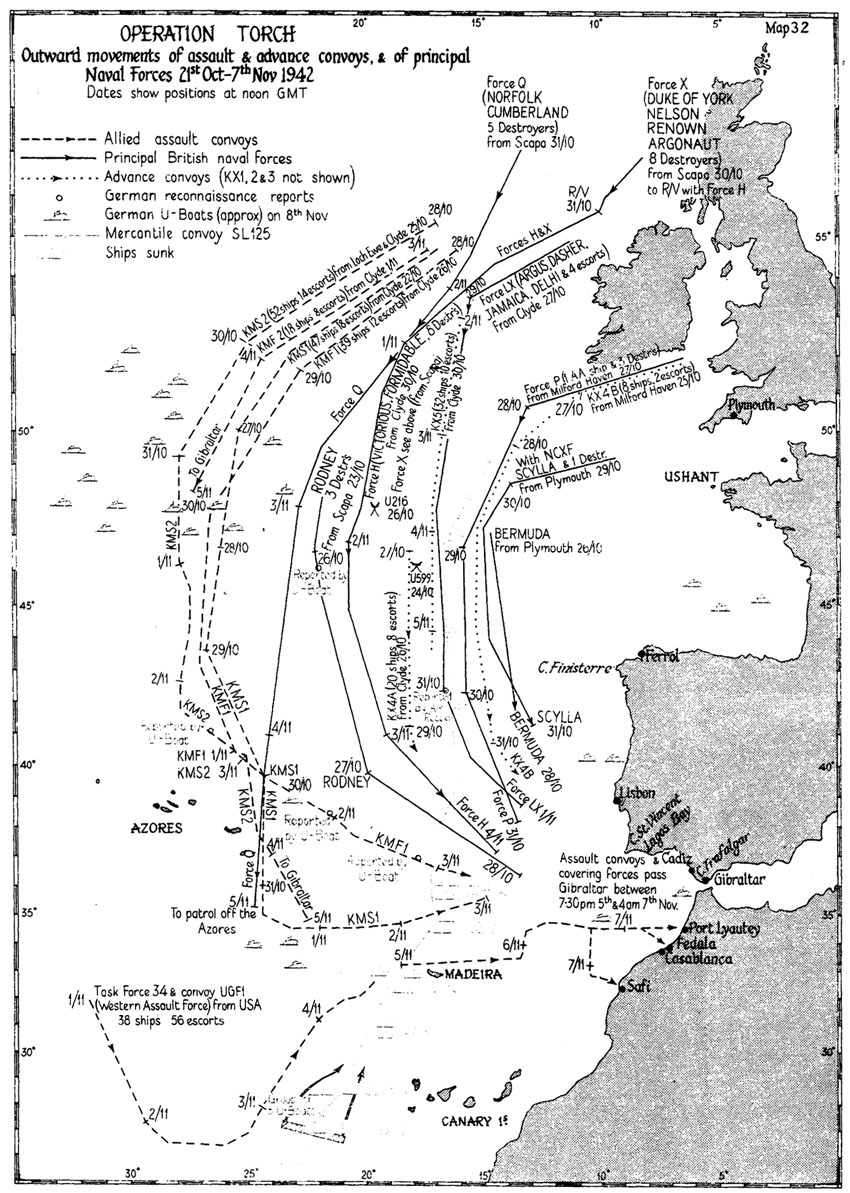
Allied convoys heading from the British Isles to North Africa

The Allies organised three amphibious task forces to simultaneously seize the key ports and airports in Morocco and Algeria, targeting Casablanca, Oran and Algiers.

A Western Task Force (aimed at Casablanca) was composed of American units, with Major General George S. Patton in command and Rear Admiral Henry Kent Hewitt heading the naval operations. This Western Task Force consisted of the U.S. 3rd and 9th Infantry Divisions, and two battalions from the U.S. 2nd Armored Division, 35,000 troops in a convoy of over 100 ships. They were transported directly from the United States in the first of a new series of UG convoys providing logistic support for the North African campaign.

The Centre Task Force, aimed at Oran, included the U.S. 2nd Battalion 509th Parachute Infantry Regiment, the U.S. 1st Infantry Division, and the U.S. 1st Armored Division, a total of 18,500 troops. They were commanded by Major General Lloyd Fredendall, and conveyed from the UK by naval units under Royal Navy Commodore Thomas Troubridge. The central task force also included air power from USS Ranger, the only true aircraft carrier involved, and the escort carrier USS Suwannee bearing Grumman Wildcats, the US Navy's standard fighter at the time.

Torch was, for propaganda purposes, a landing by U.S. forces, supported by British warships and aircraft, under the belief that this would be more palatable to French public opinion than an Anglo-American invasion. For the same reason, Churchill suggested that British soldiers might wear U.S. Army uniforms, and No. 6 Commando did so. (Fleet Air Arm aircraft did carry US "star" roundels during the operation, and two British destroyers flew the Stars and Stripes.) In reality, the Eastern Task Force, aimed at Algiers, was commanded by Lieutenant-General Kenneth Anderson and consisted of a brigade from the British 78th and the U.S. 34th Infantry Divisions, along with two British commando units (No. 1 and No. 6 Commandos), together with the RAF Regiment providing 5 squadrons of infantry and 5 Light anti-aircraft flights, totalling 20,000 troops. During the landing phase, ground forces were to be commanded by U.S. Major General Charles W. Ryder, Commanding General (CG) of the 34th Division and naval forces were commanded by Royal Navy Vice-Admiral Sir Harold Burrough.

Aerial operations were split into two commands, with Royal Air Force aircraft under Air Marshal Sir William Welsh operating east of Cape Tenez in Algeria, and all United States Army Air Forces aircraft under Major General Jimmy Doolittle, who was under the direct command of Major General Patton, operating west of Cape Tenez.

=== Vichy French forces ===
The Vichy French had around 125,000 soldiers in the territories as well as coastal artillery, 210 operational but out-of-date tanks and about 500 aircraft, of which 173 were modern Dewoitine D.520 fighters. These forces included 60,000 troops in Morocco, 15,000 in Tunisia, and 50,000 in Algeria. The bulk of the Vichy French Navy was stationed outside North Africa: three battleships and seven cruisers at Toulon and one battleship and three cruisers at Dakar. In North Africa, at Casablanca the incomplete battleship Jean Bart was used as a coastal battery and there was one cruiser, seven destroyers and eight submarines. At Oran there was a force of four destroyers and nine submarines.

== Battle ==
=== Eastern task force ===
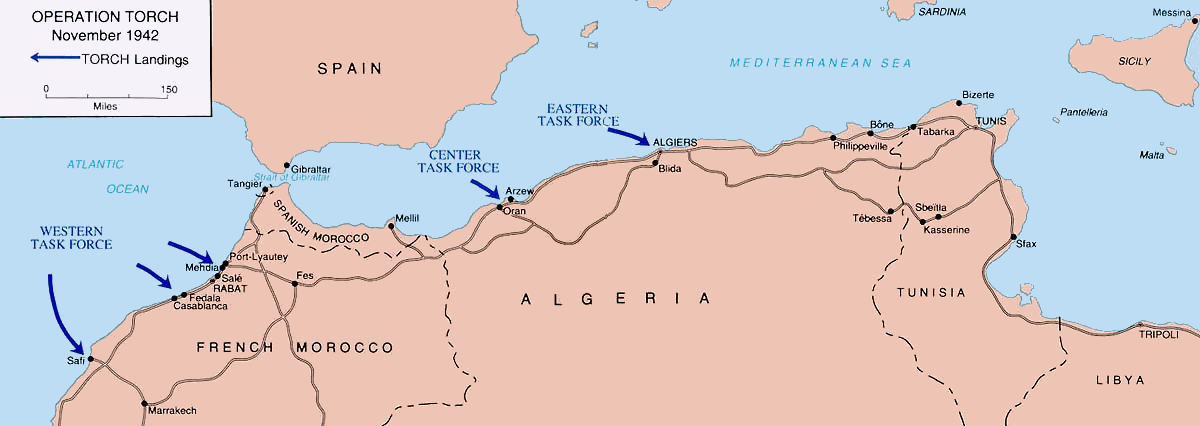
A map showing landings during Operation Torch.

In the early hours of 8 November, French Resistance fighters staged a coup in the city of Algiers. They seized control of the city, but when no US troops appeared in the morning, they quickly lost control to Vichy French forces. Meanwhile, the American consul Robert Murphy attempted to persuade General Alphonse Juin, the senior French Army officer in North Africa, to side with the Allies and place himself under the command of General Giraud. Murphy learned that Admiral François Darlan, the commander of all French forces, was also in Algiers on a private visit, and Juin insisted on contacting Darlan at once. Murphy was unable to persuade them to side with the Allies right away, and Darlan contacted Pétain, who instructed him to resist.

The invasion commenced with landings on three beaches, two west of Algiers and one east. The landing forces were under the overall command of Major-General Charles W. Ryder, commanding general of the U.S. 34th Infantry Division. The 11th Brigade Group from the British 78th Infantry Division landed on the right-hand beach; the US 168th Regimental Combat Team, from the 34th Infantry Division, supported by 6 Commando and most of 1 Commando, landed on the middle beach; and the US 39th Regimental Combat Team, from the US 9th Infantry Division, supported by the remaining 5 troops from 1 Commando, landed on the left-hand beach. The 36th Brigade Group from the British 78th Infantry Division stood by in floating reserve. Though some landings went to the wrong beaches, this was immaterial because of the lack of French opposition. Only at Cape Matifou a coastal battery opened fire, and in the forenoon some resistance was offered at the fortresses of Cape Matifou, Duperre and L'Empereur. At 06:00 the airfield at Maison Blanche was captured and at 10:00 Hawker Hurricane and Supermarine Spitfire aircraft from Gibraltar started to flow in at the airfield. A second airfield at Blida surrendered the same day to a British plane landing on the airfield.

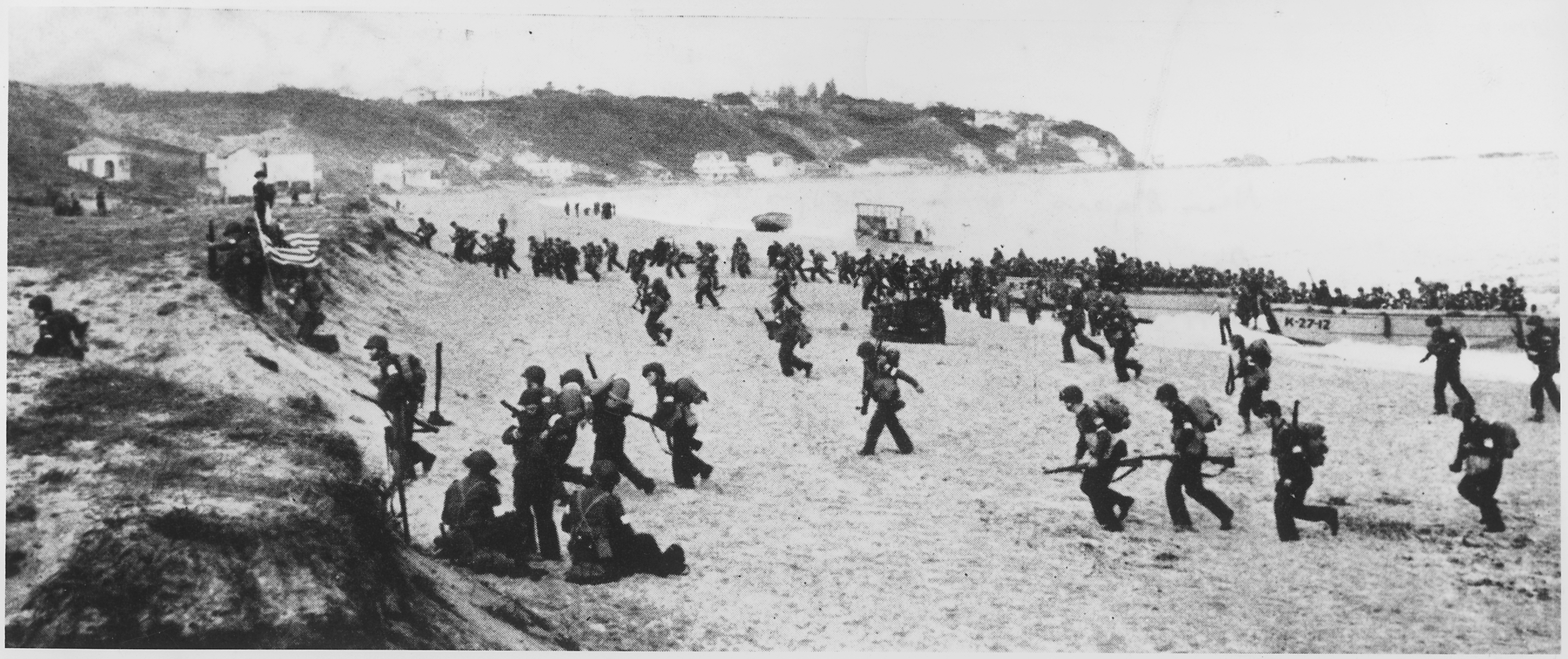
American soldiers land near Algiers. The soldier at the dune line is carrying a flag because it was hoped the French would be less likely to fire on Americans.

The only fierce fighting took place in the port of Algiers, where in Operation Terminal, the British destroyers HMS Malcolm and HMS Broke attempted to land a party of US Army Rangers directly onto the dock, to prevent the French destroying the port facilities and scuttling their ships. Heavy artillery fire hit Malcolm and forced her to abandon the operation, but Broke was able to disembark 250 Rangers who secured the power station and oil installations. At 9:15 however she too had to recall the Rangers and abandon the operation due to the heavy artillery fire. As a result of the damage received, Broke foundered the next day in bad weather.

By 16:00, the US troops had surrounded Algiers and held the coastal batteries defending the harbour. At 18:40 Juin made an agreement with Ryder to stop the fighting. The next day on 9 November a local cease-fire was negotiated and Darlan authorized the Eastern Task Force to use the harbor of Algiers, but in Oran and Morocco the fighting continued. Giraud arrived the same day in Algiers and at noon on 10 November after negotiations with General Clark, Darlan ordered all hostilities to end and to observe neutrality. On secret orders from Pétain, on 11 November he ordered the forces in Tunisia to resist a German invasion.

=== Western task force ===
The Western Task Force landed before daybreak on 8 November 1942, at three points in Morocco: In the South at Safi (Operation Blackstone), in the North at Mehdiya-Port Lyautey (Operation Goalpost) and the main thrust was at the centre in Fedala, close to Casablanca, (Operation Brushwood). Just like in Algiers, there was a failed attempt to neutralize Vichy French command in the morning of 8 November: General Béthouart was unable to convince Admiral Michelier nor General Noguès to side with the Allies. Instead they ordered the Army and Navy to oppose the invasion.

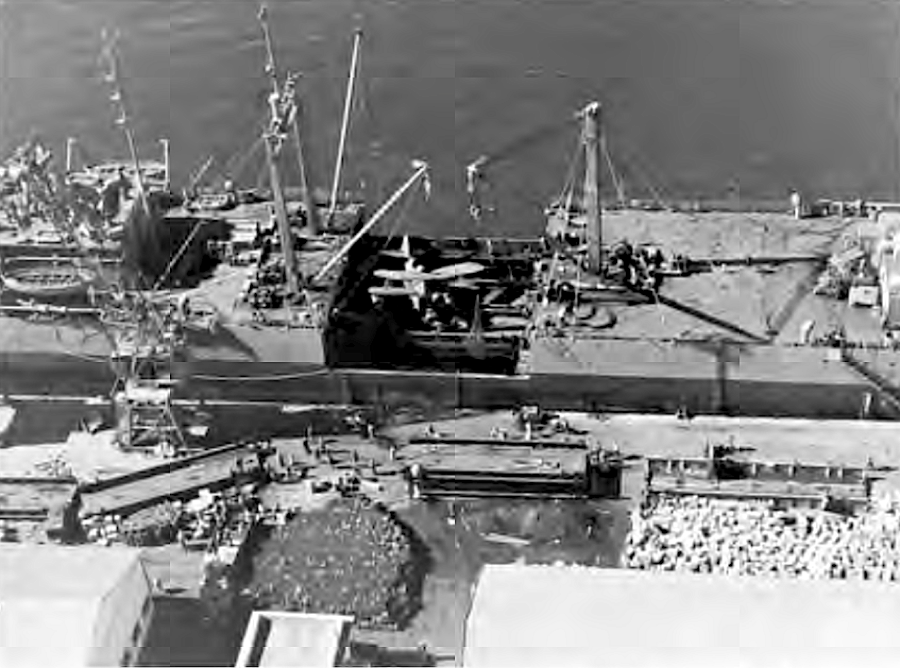
USS Lakehurst (formerly Seatrain New Jersey), after discharging medium tanks at Safi, Morocco

At Safi the objective was to capture the port facilities intact and to land the Western Task Force's medium Sherman tanks, which would be used to reinforce the assault on Casablanca. Two old destroyers, USS Cole and USS Bernadou, were to land an assault party in the harbor, whilst troops landed on the beaches would quickly move to the town. The landings were begun without covering fire, in the hope that the French would not resist at all. However, once French coastal batteries opened fire, Allied warships returned fire. Most of the landings occurred behind schedule, but met no opposition on the beaches. Under cover from fire of the battleship USS New York and cruiser USS Philadelphia, Cole and Bernadou landed their troops and the harbor was captured intact. Safi surrendered on the afternoon of 8 November. By 10 November, the landed troops moved northwards to join the siege of Casablanca.

At Port-Lyautey, the objective was to secure the port and the airfield, so that aircraft could be flown in from Gibraltar and from aircraft carriers. The landings were delayed because of navigational problems and the slow disembarkation of the troops in their landing ships. The first three waves of troops were landed unopposed on five beaches. The cruiser USS Savannah bombarded coastal batteries at Kasbah Mahdiyya. The next waves came under fire from coastal batteries and Vichy-French aircraft. A first attempt by the old destroyer USS Dallas to bring a raiding party inshore on the Sebou River to the airfield, failed on 8 November. Vichy French reinforcements coming from Rabat were bombarded by the battleship USS Texas and the cruiser Savannah. A second attempt on 10 November to take the airfield was successful and over the next two days, the escort carrier USS Chenango sent 77 Curtiss P-40 Warhawk to the airfield. With the support of aircraft from the escort carrier USS Sangamon, the Kasbah battery was taken and ships could come closer to shore to unload supplies. On 11 November The cease-fire ordered by Darlan halted all hostilities.

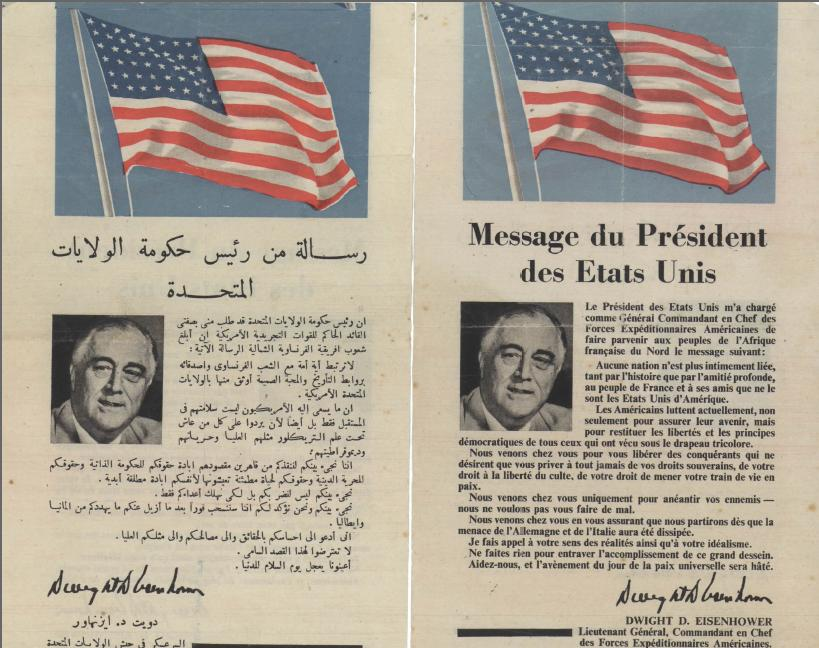
A flyer in French and Arabic that was distributed by Allied forces in the streets of Casablanca, calling on citizens to cooperate with the Allied forces

At Fedala, a small port with a large beach 15 miles (24 km) from Casablanca, weather was good but landings were delayed because troopships were not disembarking troops on schedule. The first wave reached shore unopposed at 05:00. Many landing craft were wrecked in the heavy surf or on rocks. At dawn the Vichy French shore batteries opened fire. By 07:30 fire from the cruisers USS Augusta and USS Brooklyn with their supporting destroyers, had silenced the shore batteries. At 08:00 when Vichy-French aircraft appeared and attacked, one battery reopened fire. Two Vichy-French destroyers arrived from Casablanca at 08:25 and attacked the American destroyers. By 09:05 the Vichy French destroyers had been driven away, but all available Vichy French ships sortied from Casablanca and at 10:00 renewed the attack on the American ships at Fedala. By 11:00 the battle was over, the two American cruisers had either sunk or driven ashore the light cruiser Primauguet, two flotilla leaders and four destroyers. Only one destroyer escaped back to Casablanca. Fedala surrendered at 14:30 and transport ships could move closer to shore to speed up the unloading. Meanwhile the American Covering force with the battleship USS Massachusetts had appeared before Casablanca and when coastal batteries opened fire at 07:00, the American ships responded at once and damaged the Vichy-French battleship Jean Bart with five hits, putting its one operational turret out of action. Of the eleven submarines in port, three were destroyed but the other eight took up attack positions. These submarines attacked Massachusetts; the aircraft carrier USS Ranger; and the cruisers Brooklyn and Tuscaloosa, but all their torpedoes missed, and six submarines were sunk.

On 9 November the small port of Fedala was in use and troops advanced on Casablanca. Despite having lost 55 aircraft the previous day, attacks by Vichy-French aircraft continued all day. On 10 November, Jean Bart was repaired, but when she opened fire, she was attacked by dive-bombers from the aircraft carrier Ranger and heavily damaged by two bomb hits. The Americans surrounded the port of Casablanca by 10 November but waited for the arrival of the tanks from Safi to start an all-out attack planned for 11 November at 07:15. Orders from Darlan, broadcast on 10 November, to cease resistance were ignored until 11 November 06:00, the city surrendered an hour before the final assault was due to take place.

=== Center task force ===
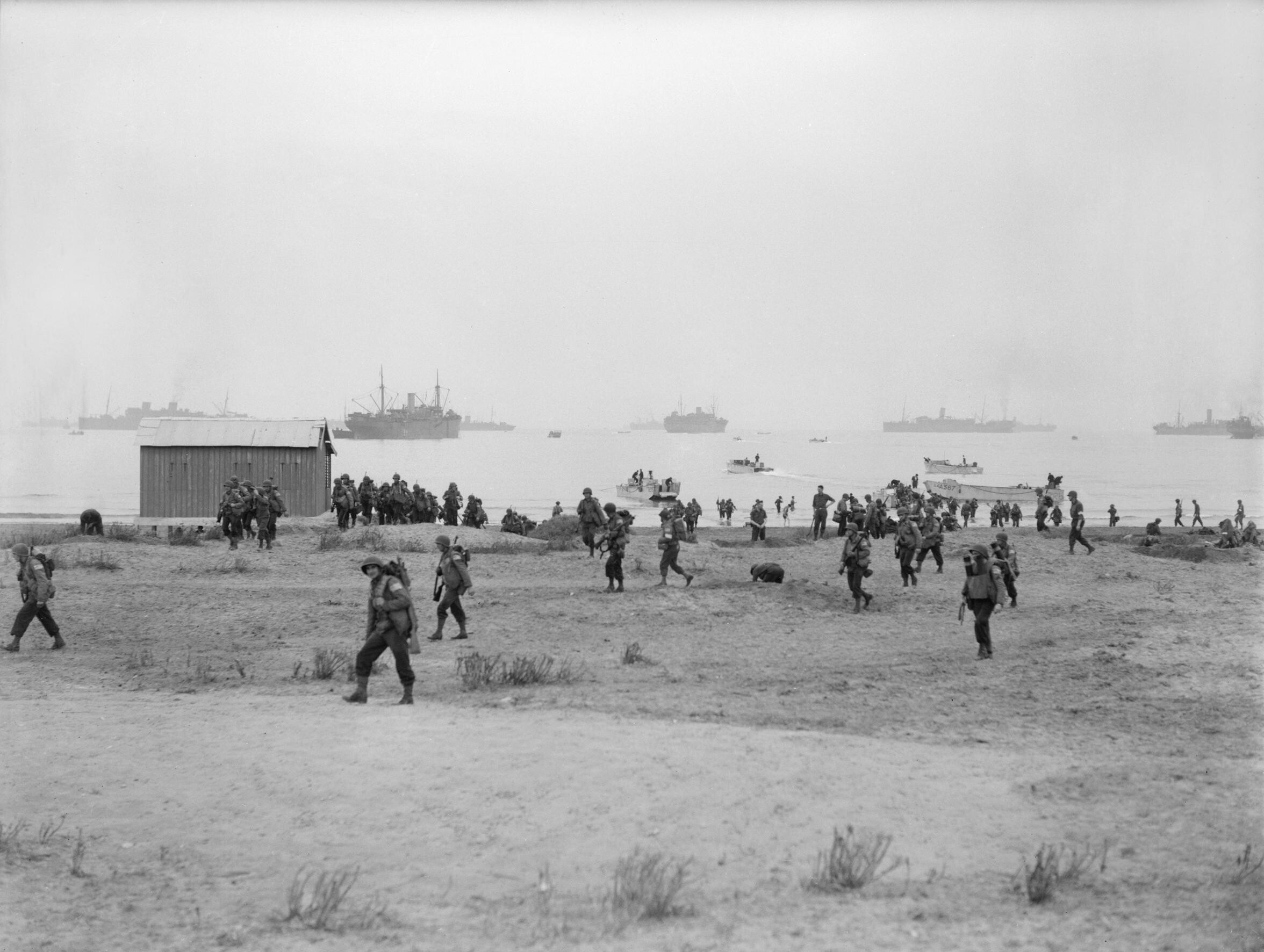
U.S. troops landing in Arzew, with troopships in the background

The Center Task Force was split among three beaches, two west of Oran and one east. Landings at the westernmost beach were delayed because of a French convoy which appeared while the minesweepers were clearing a path. Some delay and confusion, and damage to landing ships, was caused by the unexpected shallowness of water and sandbars. On all beaches the landings met no resistance.

An airborne assault by the 2nd Battalion, 509th Parachute Infantry Regiment, which flew all the way from England, over Spain, to Oran, to capture the airfields at Tafraoui and La Sénia failed. The operation was marked by communicational and navigational problems owing to the anti-aircraft and beacon ship HMS Alynbank broadcasting on the wrong frequency. Poor weather over Spain and the extreme range caused the formation to scatter and forced 30 of the 37 air transports to land in the dry salt lake to the west of the objective. Of the other aircraft, one pilot became disoriented and landed his plane in Gibraltar. Two others landed in French Morocco and three in Spanish Morocco, where another Dakota dropped its paratroopers by mistake. A total of 67 American troops were interned by Franco's forces until February 1943. Tafraoui and La Sénia were eventually captured but the role played by the airborne forces in Operation Torch was minimal. Aircraft from three British carriers attacked these airfields in the morning and destroyed seventy airplanes which were armed and ready to take off to attack. In the afternoon the Tafraoui airfield was captured by the quickly advancing troops from the beachheads, and immediately Spitfires were flown in from Gibraltar. The U.S. 1st Ranger Battalion landed east of Oran and quickly captured the shore battery at Arzew.

At the same time of the landings, in the early morning of 8 November, an attempt was made to land U.S. infantry by the sloops HMS Walney and HMS Hartland at the harbor of Oran, in order to prevent destruction of the port facilities and scuttling of ships. But both sloops were sunk by Vichy-French destroyers in the harbour and the operation failed. The Vichy French naval fleet consisting of one flotilla leader, three destroyers, one minesweeper, six submarines and some smaller vessels, broke out from the harbor and attacked the Allied invasion fleet. Over the next two days all these ships were either sunk or driven ashore, only one submarine escaped to Toulon, after an unsuccessful attack on the cruiser HMS Jamaica. French batteries and the invasion fleet exchanged fire throughout 8–9 November, with French troops defending Oran and the surrounding area stubbornly; bombardment by the British battleship HMS Rodney brought about Oran's surrender on 10 November.

=== Axis reaction ===
In the central and eastern Atlantic, U-boats had been drawn away to attack trade convoy SL 125, and troop convoys between the UK and North Africa went largely unnoticed. A Focke-Wulf Fw 200 Condor detected on 31 October a task force of aircraft carriers and cruisers, and on 2 November a returning U-boat reported a troop ship convoy.

On 4 November the Germans became aware of an impending big operation, they anticipated another convoy run to Malta or an amphibious landing in Libya or at Bougie Bay. Seven U-boats of the Atlantic force were ordered to break through the Strait of Gibraltar and go to the North African coast. Nine Mediterranean U-boats were also deployed to the same region. A total of nineteen U-boats were stationed between the Balearic Islands and Algiers, whilst the Italian Navy deployed twenty-one submarines East of Algiers. On 7 November five German submarines made contact with the British invasion forces but all their attacks missed their target. On 8 November most of these U-boats were operating near Bougie and missed the landings at Algiers. When receiving news of the landings, Dönitz ordered twenty-five of the Atlantic U-boats to move towards the Morocco area and Gibraltar, leaving only ten U-boats in the North Atlantic and bringing the U-boat main offensive against the convoy lanes to the United Kingdom to a virtual standstill. The first wave of nine U-boats to arrive off Morocco ran into a well-prepared defense and achieved little. Only U-130 sank three large transports on the anchorage of Fedala, forcing the port to close and ships to divert to Casablanca. The second wave of fourteen U-boats was sent to the area West of Gibraltar, trying to block all traffic in and out the Straits. They sank the escort carrier HMS Avenger and the destroyer tender HMS Hecla with heavy loss of life. In both theaters of operation, the Mediterranean and Atlantic, the Germans lost eight U-boats, and the Italians two. Between 8 and 14 November German bomber and torpedo aircraft attacked ships along the North African coast. They sank two troop transports, one landing ship, two transport ships and the sloop Ibis. The aircraft carrier Argus and the monitor Roberts were damaged by bombs.

=== Assault on Bougie ===
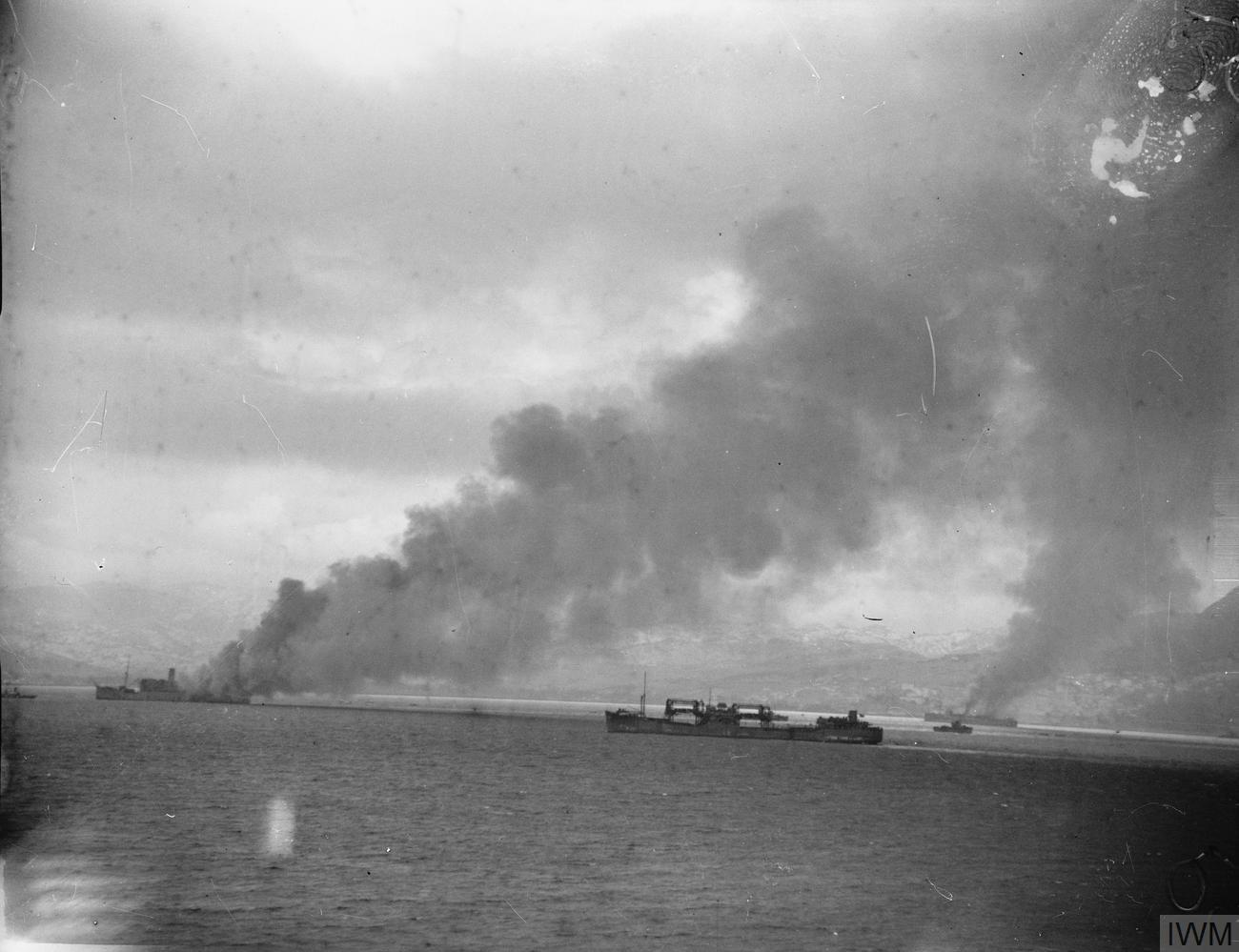
Karanja and Cathay on fire off Bougie after Axis air attacks

There were limited land communications to move quickly from Algiers eastwards to Tunisia. The Allies had planned additional landings at Bougie and Bone in order to speed up that advance, but there were not enough resources available to execute these landings together with the main landings at Oran and Algiers. On 10 November the British 36th Infantry Brigade was boarded on three troop transports which landed unopposed, under the cover of a bombardment force in the harbor of Bougie on 11 November. A further troop transport was to land commandos, RAF personnel and petrol at Djidelli, with the goal to capture the airfield there and provide air cover over Bougie. Due to the heavy surf, this landing was delayed and finally diverted to Bougie and as a consequence air cover was only available from 13 November onward. The Axis air force based in Sardinia and Sicily exploited the lack of air cover between 11 and 13 November to execute heavy attacks on the harbour of Bougie. They sank the empty troop transports Cathay, Awatea and the landing ship Karanja.

== Aftermath ==
=== Political results ===
It quickly became clear that Giraud lacked the authority to take command of the French forces. He preferred to wait in Gibraltar for the results of the landing. However, Darlan in Algiers had such authority. Eisenhower, with the support of Roosevelt and Churchill, made an agreement with Darlan, recognising him as French "High Commissioner" in North Africa. In return, Darlan ordered all French forces in North Africa to cease resistance to the Allies and to cooperate instead. The deal was made on 10 November, and French resistance ceased almost at once. The French troops in North Africa who were not already captured submitted to and eventually joined the Allied forces. Men from French North Africa would see much combat under the Allied banner as part of the French Expeditionary Corps (consisting of 112,000 troops in April 1944) in the Italian campaign, where Maghrebis (mostly Moroccans) made up over 60% of the unit's soldiers.

When Adolf Hitler learned of Darlan's deal with the Allies, he immediately ordered the occupation of Vichy France.

The Eisenhower/Darlan agreement meant that the officials appointed by the Vichy regime would remain in power in North Africa. No role was provided for Free France, which deeply offended De Gaulle. It also offended much of the British and American public, who regarded all Vichy French as Nazi collaborators. Eisenhower insisted that he had no real choice if his forces were to move on against the Axis in Tunisia, rather than fight the French in Algeria and Morocco. On 24 December, Fernand Bonnier de La Chapelle, a French resistance fighter and anti-fascist monarchist, assassinated Darlan. Giraud succeeded Darlan but, like him, replaced few of the Vichy officials. Under pressure from the Allies and De Gaulle's supporters, the French régime shifted, with Vichy officials gradually replaced and its more offensive decrees rescinded.

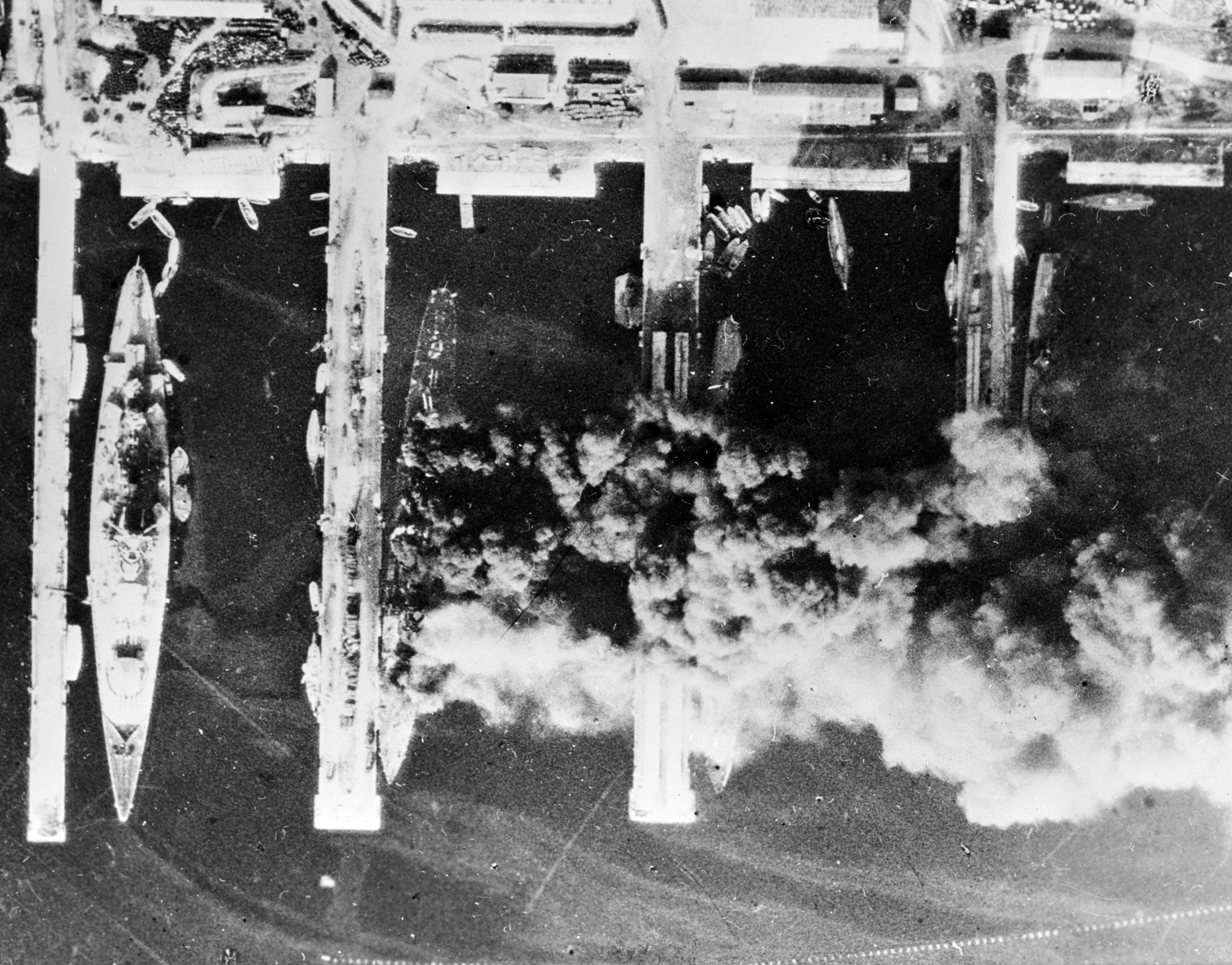
Scuttled and burning French warships in the harbor of Toulon

=== Military consequences ===
==== Toulon ====
Darlan ordered cease fire in North Africa on 10 November, and the next day the Germans and the Italians invaded Vichy France. One of their goals was to seize the French fleet in Toulon. Darlan invited the French commander of the fleet in Toulon, Jean de Laborde to join the Allies, but instead the French commander ordered the fleet scuttled on 27 November when the Germans entered Toulon.

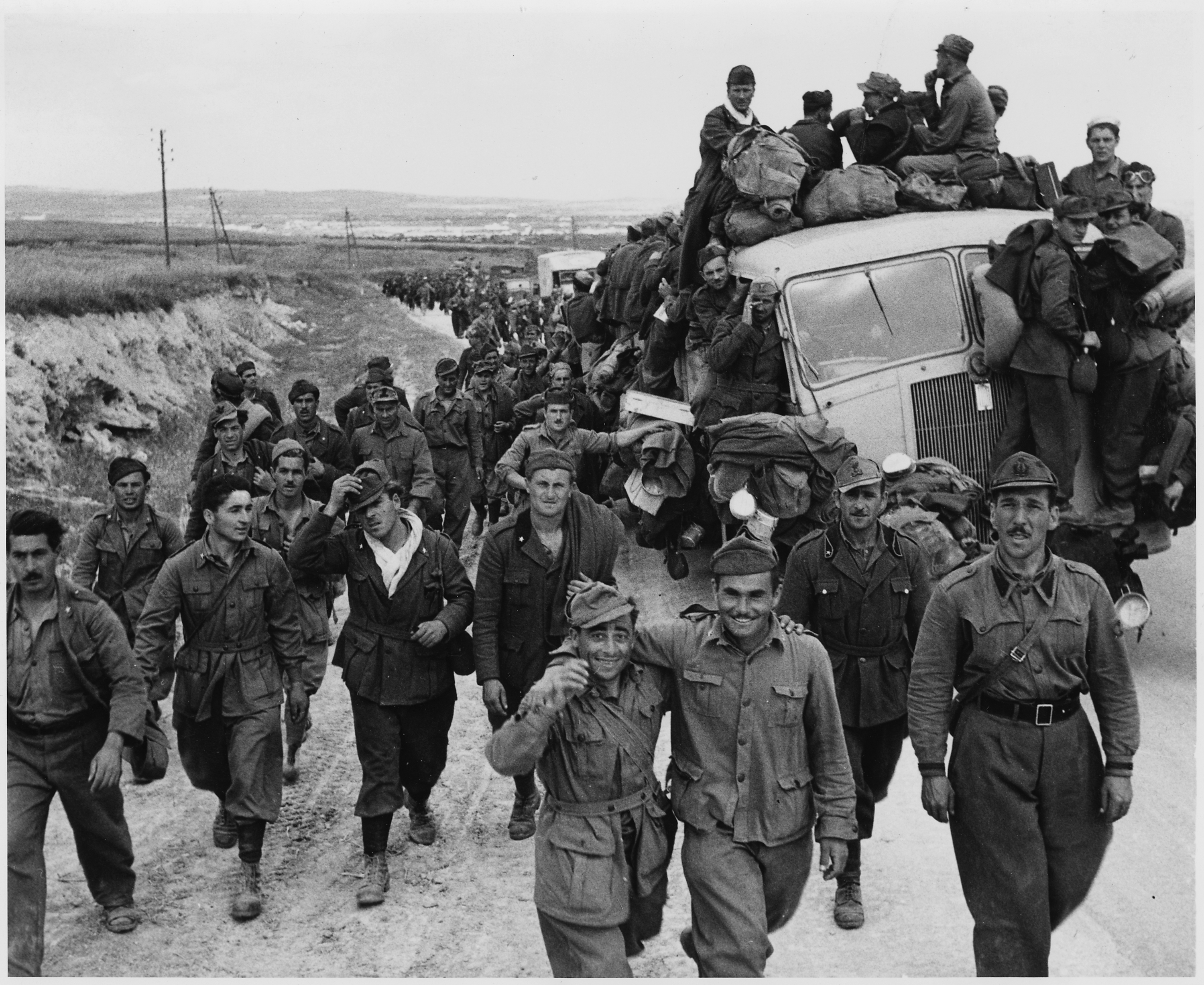
Italian prisoners of war in Tunisia

==== Tunisia ====
After the German and Italian occupation of Vichy France, the French Armée d'Afrique sided with the Allies, providing a third corps (XIX Corps) for the First Army under the command of Anderson. On 9 November, Axis forces started to build up in French Tunisia, unopposed by the local French forces. After consolidating in Algeria, the Allies began the Tunisia Campaign. Elements of the First Army came to within 40 mi (64 km) of Tunis before a counterattack at Djedeida thrust them back. Meanwhile, after their victory at El-Alamein, the Eighth Army under Lieutenant-General Bernard Montgomery was pushing German and Italian troops under Generalfeldmarschall Erwin Rommel steadily towards Tunisia from the East. In January 1943 they reached South Tunisia where Axis troops made a stand at the Mareth Line. In the west, the US II Corps suffered defeats at the Battle of Sidi Bou Zid on 14–15 February and the Battle of Kasserine Pass on 19 February, but Allied reinforcements halted the Axis advance on 22 February. Fredendall was sacked and replaced by George Patton. General Sir Harold Alexander arrived in Tunisia in late February as commander of the new 18th Army Group, which had been created to command the Eighth Army and the Allied forces fighting in Tunisia. The Axis forces attacked eastward at the Battle of Medenine on 6 March but were easily repulsed by the Eighth Army. On 9 March, Rommel left Tunisia to be replaced by Jürgen von Arnim. The First and Eighth Armies attacked again in April. On 6 May the British took Tunis and American forces reached Bizerte on 7 May. By 13 May, all Axis forces in Tunisia had surrendered.

== Later influence ==
Despite Operation Torch's role in the war and logistical success, it has been largely overlooked in many popular histories of the war and in general cultural influence. The Economist speculated that this was because French forces were the initial enemies of the landing, making for a difficult fit into the war's overall narrative in general histories. The operation was America's first armed deployment in the Arab world since the Barbary Wars and, according to The Economist, laid the foundations for America's postwar Middle East policy.

== See also ==
- Mieczysław Zygfryd Słowikowski
- North African campaign timeline
- Operation Flagpole (World War II)
- US Naval Bases North Africa

== Bibliography ==
- Atkinson, Rick (2002). An Army at Dawn. Henry Holt. ISBN 0-8050-6288-2 – via Archive Foundation.
- Blair, Clay (1998). Hitler's U-Boat War: The Hunted 1942–1945. Vol. 2. Cassell. ISBN 0-304-35261-6.
- Breuer, William B. (1985). Operation Torch : the Allied gamble to invade North Africa. New York: St. Martin's Press. ISBN 031258685X.
- Brown, J. D. (1968). Carrier Operations in World War II: The Royal Navy. London: Ian Allan.
- Eisenhower, Dwight D. (1948). Crusade in Europe. London: William Heinemann. OCLC 559866864 – via Archive Foundation.
- Edwards, Bernard (1999). Dönitz and the Wolf Packs. Brockhampton Press. ISBN 1-86019-927-5 – via Archive Foundation.
- Gaujac, Paul (2003). Le Corps expéditionnaire français en Italie (in French). Histoire et collections.
- Gelb, Norman (1992). Desperate Venture : The Story of Operation Torch, the Allied Invasion of North Africa. New York: W. Morrow. ISBN 9780688098834.
- Groom, Winston (3 April 2006). 1942: The Year That Tried Men's Souls. New York: Grove Press. p. 354. ISBN 978-0-8021-4250-4.
- Hague, Arnold (2000). The Allied Convoy System 1939–1945. Naval Institute Press. ISBN 1-55750-019-3.
- Howe, George F. (1993) [1957]. North West Africa: Seizing the Initiative in the West. The United States Army in World War II. Washington, D.C.: United States Army Center of Military History. LCCN 57060021. CMH Pub 6-1. Archived from the original on 28 May 2015.
- Husen (1999). Zabecki, David T.; Schuster, Carl O.; Rose, Paul J.; Van, William H. (eds.). World War II in Europe : an encyclopedia. Garland Pub. ISBN 9780824070298. Archived from the original on 3 February 2023.
- MacCloskey, Monro (1971). Torch and the Twelfth Air Force. New York: Rosen Press. ISBN 9780823902408.
- Mackenzie, S.P. (2014). The Second World War in Europe: Second Edition. Routledge. pp. 54–55. ISBN 978-1317864714. Archived from the original on 3 February 2023.
- Mangold, Peter (2012). Britain and the Defeated French: From Occupation to Liberation, 1940–1944. London: I.B. Tauris.
- Morison, Samuel Eliot (1947). Operations in North African waters, October 1942-June 1943. London: O.U.P.
- Pack, S.W.C. (1978). Invasion North Africa, 1942. New York: Scribner. ISBN 068415921X.
- Painton, Frederick, C., “Secret Mission to North Africa”, Reader's Digest, May 1943.
- Playfair, Major-General I. S. O.; Molony, Brigadier C. J. C.; Flynn R.N., Captain F. C. & Gleave, Group Captain T. P. (2004) [1st HMSO 1966]. Butler, J. R. M. (ed.). The Mediterranean and Middle East: The Destruction of the Axis Forces in Africa. History of the Second World War United Kingdom Military Series. Vol. IV. Uckfield, UK: Naval & Military Press. ISBN 1-84574-068-8.
- Rohwer, Jürgen (2005). Chronology of the War at Sea 1939–1945: The Naval History of World War Two (Third Revised ed.). Annapolis, Maryland: Naval Institute Press. ISBN 1-59114-119-2.
- Sutherland, Jonathan (2011). Vichy Air Force at war : the French Air Force that fought the allies in World War II. Barnsley, South Yorkshire: Pen & Sword Aviation. ISBN 9781783461257.
- Watson, Bruce Allen (2007) [1999]. Exit Rommel: The Tunisian Campaign, 1942–43. Stackpole Military History Series. Mechanicsburg, PA: Stackpole Books. ISBN 978-0-8117-3381-6. OCLC 40595324.
- Willmott, H.P. (1984). June, 1944. Poole, Dorset: Blandford Press. ISBN 0-7137-1446-8 – via Archive Foundation.
- Lambert, John W. (1992), Phalanx Publishing Co., Ltd., Wildcats over Casablanca, pp. 3

=== Online ===
- "The Stamford Historical Society Presents: Operation Torch and the Invasion of North Africa". Archived from the original on 4 September 2021.
- Satloff, Robert (9 October 2017). "Operation Torch and the Birth of American Middle East Policy, 75 Years On". Washington D.C.: Washington Institute for Near East Policy.
- United States Military Academy. Department of Military Art and Engineering (1947). The War in North Africa Part 2 – The Allied Invasion. West Point, NY: Department of Military Art and Engineering, United States Military Academy. pp. 4–5. Archived from the original on 3 February 2023.
- R.B.S. (9 November 2017). "Remembering Operation Torch on its 75th anniversary". The Economist. Archived from the original on 24 April 2018.
