= List of cruisers of World War II =

The heavy cruiser was designed for long range, high speed, and heavy calibre naval guns. The first heavy cruisers were built in 1915, although it only became a widespread classification following the London Naval Treaty in 1930. The heavy cruiser's immediate precursors were the light cruiser designs of the 1910s and 1920s; the US 8-inch 'treaty cruisers' of the 1920s were originally classed as light cruisers until the London Treaty forced their redesignation. Heavy cruisers continued in use until after World War II.

The German Deutschland class was a series of three Panzerschiffe ("armored ships"), a form of heavily armed cruiser, built by the German Reichsmarine in nominal accordance with restrictions imposed by the Treaty of Versailles. The class is named after the first ship of this class to be completed (Deutschland). All three ships were launched between 1931 and 1934, and served with Germany's Kriegsmarine during World War II. During the war, they were reclassified as heavy cruisers.

The British press began referring to the vessels as pocket battleships, in reference to the heavy firepower contained in the relatively small vessels; they were considerably smaller than contemporary battleships, though at 28 knots, were slower than battlecruisers. And although their displacement and scale of armor protection was that of a heavy cruiser, they were armed with guns larger than the heavy cruisers of other nations. Deutschland-class ships continue to be called pocket battleships in some circles. The development of the anti-aircraft cruiser began in 1935 when the Royal Navy re-armed HMS Coventry and HMS Curlew. Torpedo tubes and 6-inch (152 mm) low-angle guns were removed from these World War I light cruisers and replaced by ten 4-inch (102 mm) high-angle guns with appropriate fire-control equipment to provide larger warships with protection against high-altitude bombers.

A tactical shortcoming was recognized after completing six additional conversions of C-class cruisers. Having sacrificed anti-ship weapons for anti-aircraft armament, the converted anti-aircraft cruisers might need protection themselves against surface units. New construction was undertaken to create cruisers of similar speed and displacement with dual-purpose guns. Dual-purpose guns offered good anti-aircraft protection with anti-surface capability for the traditional light cruiser role of defending capital ships from destroyers. The first purpose built anti-aircraft cruiser was the British Dido class, completed shortly before the beginning of World War II. The US Navy Atlanta-class anti-aircraft cruisers (CLAA) were designed to match capabilities of the Royal Navy. Both Dido and Atlanta carried torpedo tubes.

The quick-firing dual-purpose gun anti-aircraft cruiser concept was embraced in several designs completed too late to see combat including USS Worcester and USS Roanoke completed in 1948 and 1949, two De Zeven Provinciën-class cruisers completed in 1953, De Grasse and Colbert completed in 1955 and 1959, and HMS Tiger, HMS Lion and HMS Blake completed between 1959 and 1961.

The List of ships of World War II contains major military vessels of the war, arranged alphabetically and by type. The list includes armed vessels that served during the war and in the immediate aftermath, inclusive of localized ongoing combat operations, garrison surrenders, post-surrender occupation, colony re-occupation, troop and prisoner repatriation, to the end of 1945. For smaller vessels, see also List of World War II ships of less than 1000 tons. Some uncompleted Axis ships are included, out of historic interest. Ships are designated to the country under which they operated for the longest period of the World War II, regardless of where they were built or previous service history.

== List ==
Click on headers to sort columns.

List of cruisers of World War II
Ship	Operator	Class	Type	Displacement (tons)	First commissioned	Fate
Abdiel	Royal Navy	Abdiel	minelayer cruiser	2,650	15 April 1941	sunk 10 September 1943
Abrek	Soviet Navy	Kazarskii	torpedo cruiser	535	23 September 1897	rated as a destroyer by World War II, scrapped 1948
Abukuma	Imperial Japanese Navy	Nagara	light cruiser	5,088	6 May 1925	Sunk 26 October 1944
Achilles	Royal New Zealand Navy	Leander	light cruiser	6,985	10 October 1933	sold to India 5 July 1948 as Delhi, scrapped 1978
Adelaide	Royal Australian Navy	Birmingham	light cruiser	5,560	5 August 1922	scrapped 1949
Admiral Graf Spee	Kriegsmarine	Deutschland	heavy cruiser	14,650	6 January 1936	scuttled 17 December 1939
Admiral Hipper	Kriegsmarine	Admiral Hipper	heavy cruiser	15,910	25 April 1939	Scuttled 2 May 1945
Admiral Scheer	Kriegsmarine	Deutschland	heavy cruiser	13,440	12 November 1934	sunk 9 April 1945
Adventure	Royal Navy		minelayer cruiser	6,740	2 October 1926	reclassified as repair ship 1944, sold for scrap 1947
Agano	Imperial Japanese Navy	Agano	light cruiser	6,547	31 October 1942	sunk 17 February 1944
Ajax	Royal Navy	Leander	light cruiser	7,220	3 June 1935	Scrapped 1949
Alaska	United States Navy	Alaska	large cruiser	29,779	17 June 1944	scrapped 1960
Alberico da Barbiano	Regia Marina	Condottieri (Alberto di Giussano)	light cruiser	6,467	9 June 1931	sunk 13 December 1941
Alberto di Giussano	Regia Marina	Condottieri (Alberto di Giussano)	light cruiser	6,467	5 February 1931	sunk 13 December 1941
Algérie	French Navy		heavy cruiser	10,000	15 June 1934	scuttled 27 November 1942, scrapped 1951
Almirante Brown	Argentine Navy	Veinticinco de Mayo	heavy cruiser	6,800	18 July 1931	scrapped 1962
Almirante Cervera	Spanish Navy	Almirante Cervera	light cruiser	7,475	15 September 1927	stricken 1966
Almirante Grau	Peruvian Navy	Almirante Grau	scout cruiser	3,100	10 August 1907	stricken 1958
Amsterdam	United States Navy	Cleveland	light cruiser	11,744	8 January 1945	sold for scrap 11 February 1972
Aoba	Imperial Japanese Navy	Aoba	heavy cruiser	8,300	20 September 1927	sunk 28 July 1945, raised and scrapped 1946-1947
Apollo	Royal Navy	Abdiel	minelayer cruiser	2,650	12 February 1944	scrapped November 1962
Arcona	Kriegsmarine	Gazelle	light cruiser	2,663	12 May 1903	scuttled 3 May 1945, scrapped 1948
Arethusa	Royal Navy	Arethusa	light cruiser	5,220	23 May 1935	scrapped 1950
Argonaut	Royal Navy	Dido	light cruiser	5,600	8 August 1942	scrapped 1955
Ariadne	Royal Navy	Abdiel	minelayer cruiser	2,650	9 October 1943	scrapped June 1965
Armando Diaz	Regia Marina	Condottieri (Cadorna)	light cruiser	5,321	29 April 1933	sunk 25 February 1941
Asama	Imperial Japanese Navy	Asama	armoured cruiser	9,560	18 March 1899	scrapped 1947
Ashigara	Imperial Japanese Navy	Myōkō	heavy cruiser	13,300	20 August 1929	Sunk 8 June 1945
Astoria (CA-34)	United States Navy	New Orleans	heavy cruiser	9,950	28 April 1934	sunk 9 August 1942 Battle of Savo Island
Astoria (CL-90)	United States Navy	Cleveland	light cruiser	11,744	17 May 1944	sold for scrap 12 January 1971
Atago	Imperial Japanese Navy	Takao	heavy cruiser	14,616	30 March 1932	sunk 23 October 1944
Atlanta (CL-51)	United States Navy	Atlanta	light cruiser	6,718	24 December 1941	sunk 13 November 1942
Atlanta (CL-104)	United States Navy	Cleveland	light cruiser	11,744	3 December 1944	sunk as target 1 October 1970
Attilio Regolo	Regia Marina	Capitani Romani	flotilla leader	3,750	15 May 1942	ceded to France as Châteaurenault 1948, scrapped 1979
Augusta	United States Navy	Northampton	heavy cruiser	9,200	30 January 1931	Scrapped 1960
Aurora	Soviet Navy	Pallada	protected cruiser	6,731	29 July 1903	In 1957 became a museum ship.
Aurora	Royal Navy	Arethusa	light cruiser	5,270	12 November 1937	to Republic of China as Chung King 19 May 1948, defected to Communist China 25 February 1949
Australia	Royal Australian Navy	County (Kent)	heavy cruiser	9,850	24 April 1928	sold for scrap 25 January 1955
Azuma	Imperial Japanese Navy		armoured cruiser	9,131	28 July 1900	struck 1941, scrapped 1946
Bahia	Brazilian Navy	Bahia	scout cruiser	3,050	21 May 1910	lost 4 July 1945
Baltimore	United States Navy	Baltimore	heavy cruiser	13,600	15 April 1943	decommissioned 1956, scrapped 1972
Bałtyk	Polish Navy		training cruiser	7,995	15 February 1899	captured by Germany 19 September 1939 and converted to barrack ship, scrapped 1942
Bari	Regia Marina	Pillau	light cruiser	3,284	14 December 1914	sunk 28 June 1943
Bartolomeo Colleoni	Regia Marina	Condottieri (Alberto di Giussano)	light cruiser	6,467	10 February 1932	sunk 19 July 1940
Belfast	Royal Navy	Town (Edinburgh)	light cruiser	10,635	5 August 1939	museum ship since 21 October 1971
Bellona	Royal Navy	Dido (Bellona)	light cruiser	5,950	29 October 1943	scrapped 1959
Berk-i Satvet	Turkish Navy	Peyk-i Şevket	torpedo cruiser	775	13 November 1907	Scrapped 1946
Bermuda	Royal Navy	Crown Colony (Fiji)	light cruiser	8,530	21 August 1942	scrapped 1965
Berwick	Royal Navy	County (Kent)	heavy cruiser	9,850	12 July 1927	scrapped 1948
Biloxi	United States Navy	Cleveland	light cruiser	11,744	31 August 1943	sold for scrap 5 March 1962
Birmingham	Royal Navy	Town (Southampton)	light cruiser	9,770	18 November 1937	scrapped 1960
Birmingham	United States Navy	Cleveland	light cruiser	11,744	29 January 1943	sold for scrap 12 November 1959
Bistrița	Royal Romanian Navy	Bistrița	coastguard cruiser	100	1888	Used as river gunboat after the war, scrapped 1950's
Black Prince	Royal Navy	Dido (Bellona)	light cruiser	5,950	30 November 1943	scrapped 1962
Blanco Encalada	Chilean Navy		protected cruiser	3,435	1895	struck 19 December 1945
Blücher	Kriegsmarine	Admiral Hipper	heavy cruiser	15,910	20 September 1939	sunk 9 April 1940
Boise	United States Navy	Brooklyn	light cruiser	9,767	12 August 1938	to Argentina as ARA Nueve de Julio January 1951, scrapped 1983
Bolzano	Regia Marina		heavy cruiser	10,890	19 August 1933	sunk 21 June 1944
Bonaventure	Royal Navy	Dido	light cruiser	5,600	24 May 1940	sunk 31 March 1941
Boston	United States Navy	Baltimore	heavy cruiser	13,600	30 June 1943	converted to missile cruiser 1955, decommissioned 1970, scrapped 1975
Bremerton	United States Navy	Baltimore	heavy cruiser	13,600	29 April 1945	decommissioned 29 July 1960, scrapped 1974
Brooklyn	United States Navy	Brooklyn	light cruiser	9,767	30 September 1937	to Chile as O'Higgins January 1951, sunk under tow 1992
Caio Mario	Regia Marina	Capitani Romani	flotilla leader	3,750	Never commissioned	launched 17 August 1941, captured by Germany and converted as floating oil tank, scuttled 1944
Cairo	Royal Navy	C (Carlisle)	light cruiser	4,200	24 September 1919	lost 12 August 1942
Calcutta	Royal Navy	C (Carlisle)	light cruiser	4,200	21 August 1919	lost 1 June 1941
Caledon	Royal Navy	C (Caledon)	light cruiser	4,180	6 March 1917	scrapped 1948
Calypso	Royal Navy	C (Caledon)	light cruiser	4,180	6 March 1917	scrapped January 1948
Canarias	Spanish Navy	Canarias	heavy cruiser	10,670	September 1936	scrapped 1977
Canberra	Royal Australian Navy	County (Kent)	heavy cruiser	9,850	10 July 1928	scuttled 9 August 1942
Canberra	United States Navy	Baltimore	heavy cruiser	13,600	14 October 1943	converted to missile cruiser 1956, decommissioned 1970, scrapped 1980
Capetown	Royal Navy	C (Carlisle)	light cruiser	4,200	10 April 1922	Scrapped June 1946
Caradoc	Royal Navy	C (Caledon)	light cruiser	4,180	15 June 1917	scrapped 1946
Cardiff	Royal Navy	C (Ceres)	light cruiser	4,290	25 June 1917	scrapped 1946
Carlisle	Royal Navy	C (Carlisle)	light cruiser	4,200	11 November 1918	constructive total loss 9 October 1942, scrapped 1948
Caroline	Royal Navy	C (Caroline)	light cruiser	4,200	4 December 1914	used as floating establishment 1924-2009, decommissioned 2011, preserved as museum ship
Ceres	Royal Navy	C (Ceres)	light cruiser	4,290	1 June 1917	scrapped 1946
Ceylon	Royal Navy	Crown Colony (Ceylon)	light cruiser	8,530	13 July 1943	to Peru as BAP Coronel Bolognesi 1960, scrapped 1985
Chacabuco	Chilean Navy		protected cruiser	4,500	1902	discarded 1952
Chao Ho	Republic of China Navy	Chao Ho	protected cruiser	2,707	21 February 1912	sunk 28 September 1937
Charybdis	Royal Navy	Dido	light cruiser	5,600	3 December 1941	sunk 23 October 1943
Chervona Ukraina	Soviet Navy	Admiral Nakhimov	light cruiser	7,480	21 March 1927	sunk 12 November 1941, raised 3 November 1947, used as target 1950-1980
Chester	United States Navy	Northampton	heavy cruiser	9,200	24 June 1930	scrapped 1959
Chicago (CA-29)	United States Navy	Northampton	heavy cruiser	9,200	9 March 1931	sunk 30 January 1943
Chicago (CA-136)	United States Navy	Baltimore	heavy cruiser	13,600	10 January 1945	converted to missile cruiser 1964, decommissioned 1980, scrapped 1992
Chikuma	Imperial Japanese Navy	Tone	heavy cruiser	15,200	30 May 1939	sunk 25 October 1944
Chōkai	Imperial Japanese Navy	Takao	heavy cruiser	15,781	30 June 1932	sunk 25 October 1944
Cincinnati	United States Navy	Omaha	light cruiser	7,050	1 January 1924	scrapped 1946
Clas Fleming	Swedish Navy		minelayer cruiser	1,550	23 February 1914	Scrapped 1960
Claudio Druso	Regia Marina	Capitani Romani	flotilla leader	3,750	Never commissioned	laid down 27 September 1939, construction stopped June 1940, scrapped 1941-1942
Claudio Tiberio	Regia Marina	Capitani Romani	flotilla leader	3,750	Never commissioned	laid down 28 September 1939, construction stopped June 1940, scrapped 1941-1942
Cleopatra	Royal Navy	Dido	light cruiser	5,600	5 December 1941	scrapped 1958
Cleveland	United States Navy	Cleveland	light cruiser	11,744	15 June 1942	sold for scrap 18 February 1960
Colbert	French Navy	Suffren	heavy cruiser	10,000	4 March 1931	scuttled 27 November 1942
Colombo	Royal Navy	C (Carlisle)	light cruiser	4,200	18 June 1919	scrapped 1948
Columbia	United States Navy	Cleveland	light cruiser	11,744	29 July 1942	sold for scrap 18 February 1959
Columbus	United States Navy	Baltimore	heavy cruiser	13,600	8 June 1945	converted to missile cruiser 1962, decommissioned 1975, scrapped 1977
Concord	United States Navy	Omaha	light cruiser	7,050	3 November 1923	scrapped 1947
Cornelio Silla	Regia Marina	Capitani Romani	flotilla leader	3,750	Never commissioned	launched 28 June 1941, captured by Germany and never completed, sunk July 1944
Cornwall	Royal Navy	County (Kent)	heavy cruiser	9,850	8 May 1928	sunk 5 April 1942
Coronel Bolognesi	Peruvian Navy	Almirante Grau	scout cruiser	3,100	10 August 1907	stricken 1958
Coventry	Royal Navy	C (Ceres)	light cruiser	4,290	21 February 1918	lost 14 September 1942
Cuba	Cuban Constitutional Navy		light cruiser	2,023	1911	stricken 1971
Cumberland	Royal Navy	County (Kent)	heavy cruiser	9,850	23 February 1928	scrapped 1959
Curacoa	Royal Navy	C (Ceres)	light cruiser	4,290	18 February 1918	lost 2 October 1942
Curlew	Royal Navy	C (Ceres)	light cruiser	4,290	14 December 1917	lost 26 May 1940
Dalmacija	Royal Yugoslav Navy; Regia Marina; Kriegsmarine	Gazelle	light cruiser	2,963	25 June 1900	captured by Italy as Cattaro 25 April 1941, captured by Germany as Niobe September 1943, ran aground and destroyed December 1943, scrapped 1952
Danae	Royal Navy; Polish Navy	Danae	light cruiser	4,850	22 July 1918	to Poland as ORP Conrad 4 October 1944, scrapped March 1948
Dauntless	Royal Navy	Danae	light cruiser	4,850	22 November 1918	scrapped 1946
Dayton	United States Navy	Cleveland	light cruiser	11,744	7 January 1945	sold for scrap 6 April 1962
De Ruyter	Royal Netherlands Navy		light cruiser	6,442	3 October 1936	sunk 28 February 1942
Delhi	Royal Navy	Danae	light cruiser	4,850	7 June 1919	scrapped 1948
Denver	United States Navy	Cleveland	light cruiser	11,744	15 October 1942	sold for scrap 4 February 1960
Despatch	Royal Navy	Danae	light cruiser	4,850	2 June 1922	scrapped 1946
Detroit	United States Navy	Omaha	light cruiser	7,050	31 July 1923	scrapped 1946
Deutschland	Kriegsmarine	Deutschland	heavy cruiser	12,430	1 April 1933	renamed Lützow January 1940, sunk as target 22 July 1947
Devonshire	Royal Navy	County (London)	heavy cruiser	9,850	18 March 1929	scrapped 12 December 1954
Diadem	Royal Navy	Dido (Bellona)	light cruiser	5,950	6 January 1944	to Pakistan as Babur February 1956, scrapped 1985
Dido	Royal Navy	Dido	light cruiser	5,600	30 September 1940	scrapped 1957
Diomede	Royal Navy	Danae	light cruiser	4,850	22 October 1922	scrapped 1946
Dorsetshire	Royal Navy	County (Norfolk)	heavy cruiser	10,035	30 September 1930	sunk 5 April 1942
Dragon	Royal Navy; Polish Navy	Danae	light cruiser	4,850	16 August 1918	to Poland 15 January 1943, scuttled 20 July 1944 as Gooseberry breakwater blockship
Duguay-Trouin	French Navy; Free French Naval Forces	Duguay-Trouin	light cruiser	7,249	2 November 1926	decommissioned 29 March 1952
Duluth	United States Navy	Cleveland	light cruiser	11,744	18 September 1944	sold for scrap 14 November 1960
Dunedin	Royal Navy	Danae	light cruiser	4,850	13 September 1919	sunk 24 November 1941
Dupleix	French Navy	Suffren	heavy cruiser	10,000	7 July 1932	scuttled 27 November 1942
Duquesne	French Navy; Free French Naval Forces	Duquesne	heavy cruiser	10,000	6 December 1928	sold for scrap 27 July 1956
Durban	Royal Navy	Danae	light cruiser	4,850	1 November 1921	scuttled 9 June 1944 as Gooseberry breakwater blockship
Edinburgh	Royal Navy	Town (Edinburgh)	light cruiser	10,635	6 July 1939	sunk 2 May 1942
Effingham	Royal Navy	Hawkins	heavy cruiser	9,860	2 July 1925	wrecked 18 May 1940
Elli	Hellenic Navy	Chao Ho	protected cruiser	2,115	November 1913	sunk 15 August 1940
Emanuele Filiberto Duca d'Aosta	Regia Marina	Condottieri (Duca d'Aosta)	light cruiser	8,317	13 July 1935	ceded to USSR as Z15 2 March 1949, renamed Stalingrad, later Kerch, scrapped 1960s
Emden	Kriegsmarine		light cruiser	5,300	15 October 1925	scuttled 3 May 1945, scrapped 1949
Emerald	Royal Navy	Emerald	light cruiser	7,580	14 January 1926	scrapped July 1948
Émile Bertin	French Navy; Free French Naval Forces		light cruiser	5,886	28 January 1935	scrapped October 1959
Enterprise	Royal Navy	Emerald	light cruiser	7,580	7 April 1926	scrapped April 1946
Etna	Regia Marina	Etna	light cruiser	5,900	Never commissioned	originally ordered by Royal Thai Navy in 1938 as Taksin, requisitioned by Italy in 1941, never completed
Eugenio di Savoia	Regia Marina	Condottieri (Duca d'Aosta)	light cruiser	8,317	16 January 1936	ceded to Greece as Elli 1950, scrapped 1973
Euryalus	Royal Navy	Dido	light cruiser	5,600	30 June 1941	scrapped 1959
Exeter	Royal Navy	York	heavy cruiser	8,390	23 July 1931	sunk 1 March 1942
Fall River	United States Navy	Baltimore	heavy cruiser	13,600	1 July 1945	decommissioned 1947, scrapped 1972
Fiji	Royal Navy	Crown Colony (Fiji)	light cruiser	8,530	5 May 1940	sunk 22 May 1941
Fiume	Regia Marina	Zara	heavy cruiser	11,500	23 November 1931	sunk 29 March 1941
Flint	United States Navy	Atlanta (Oakland)	light cruiser	6,718	31 August 1944	decommissioned 1947, scrapped 1966
Foch	French Navy	Suffren	heavy cruiser	10,000	15 August 1931	scuttled 27 November 1942
Frobisher	Royal Navy	Hawkins	heavy cruiser	9,860	20 September 1924	scrapped 26 March 1949
Furutaka	Imperial Japanese Navy	Furutaka	heavy cruiser	7,100	31 March 1926	sunk 12 October 1942
Fylgia	Swedish Navy		armoured cruiser	4,300	21 June 1907	sold for scrap 1957
Galatea	Royal Navy	Arethusa	light cruiser	5,220	14 August 1935	sunk 14 December 1941
Galicia	Spanish Navy	Almirante Cervera	light cruiser	7,475	30 August 1925	stricken February 1970
Gambia	Royal Navy; Royal New Zealand Navy	Crown Colony (Fiji)	light cruiser	8,530	21 February 1942	scrapped 1968
General Belgrano	Argentine Navy	Giuseppe Garibaldi	armoured cruiser	6,100	8 October 1898	struck 8 May 1947, sold for scrap 1953
George Leygues	French Navy; Free French Naval Forces	La Galissonnière	light cruiser	7,600	15 November 1937	scrapped 1959
Georgios Averof	Hellenic Navy	Pisa	armoured cruiser	9,450	16 May 1911	Decommissioned 1951, museum ship
Giovanni delle Bande Nere	Regia Marina	Condottieri (Alberto di Giussano)	light cruiser	6,467	27 April 1931	sunk 1 April 1942
Giulio Germanico	Regia Marina	Capitani Romani	flotilla leader	3,750	19 January 1956	launched 26 July 1941, scuttled by Germany 28 September 1943, raised and completed by Italian Navy as San Marco 19 January 1956, decommissioned 1971
Giuseppe Garibaldi	Regia Marina	Condottieri (Duca degli Abruzzi)	light cruiser	11,170	20 December 1937	converted to missile cruiser 1961, scrapped 1972
Glasgow	Royal Navy	Town (Southampton)	light cruiser	9,100	9 September 1937	paid off November 1956
Gloire	French Navy; Free French Naval Forces	La Galissonnière	light cruiser	7,600	15 November 1937	scrapped 1958
Gloucester	Royal Navy	Town (Gloucester)	light cruiser	9,400	31 January 1939	sunk 22 May 1941
Gorizia	Regia Marina	Zara	heavy cruiser	11,900	31 December 1931	sunk 1943
Gotland	Swedish Navy		seaplane cruiser	4,750	14 December 1934	Scrapped 1963
Guam	United States Navy	Alaska	large cruiser	29,779	17 September 1944	scrapped 1961
Haguro	Imperial Japanese Navy	Myoko	heavy cruiser	13,300	25 April 1929	sunk 16 May 1945
Hai Chen	Republic of China Navy	Hai Yung	protected cruiser	2,680	21 September 1898	scuttled 25 September 1937, salvaged and scrapped 1964
Hai Chi	Republic of China Navy	Hai Chi	protected cruiser	4,232	10 May 1899	scuttled 11 August 1937
Hai Chou	Republic of China Navy	Hai Yung	protected cruiser	2,680	24 August 1898	scuttled 25 September 1937, salvaged and scrapped 1960
Hai Yung	Republic of China Navy	Hai Yung	protected cruiser	2,680	27 July 1898	scuttled 11 August 1937
Hamidiye	Turkish Navy		protected cruiser	3,904	15 April 1904	paid off March 1947, sold for scrap on 10 September 1964
Hawaii	United States Navy	Alaska	large cruiser	29,779	Never commissioned	launched 3 November 1945, construction stopped at 82.4% completion, scrapped 1959
Hawkins	Royal Navy	Hawkins	heavy cruiser	9,860	25 July 1919	scrapped 21 August 1947
Helena (CL-50)	United States Navy	Brooklyn (St. Louis)	light cruiser	10,000	18 September 1939	sunk 6 July 1943
Helena (CA-75)	United States Navy	Baltimore	heavy cruiser	13,600	4 September 1945	decommissioned 1963, scrapped 1975
Hekla	Royal Danish Navy	Hekla	light cruiser	1,301	1891	stricken 1954
Hermione	Royal Navy	Dido	light cruiser	5,600	25 March 1941	sunk 16 June 1942
Hirado	Imperial Japanese Navy	Chikuma	protected cruiser	5,040	17 June 1912	stricken 1 April 1940, scrapped January 1947
Hobart	Royal Australian Navy	Leander (Amphion)	light cruiser	6,980	28 September 1938	scrapped 1962
Honolulu	United States Navy	Brooklyn	light cruiser	9,767	15 June 1938	decommissioned 1947, scrapped 1959
Houston (CA-30)	United States Navy	Northampton	heavy cruiser	9,200	17 June 1930	sunk 1 March 1942
Houston (CL-81)	United States Navy	Cleveland	light cruiser	11,744	20 December 1943	sold for scrap 1 June 1961
Indianapolis	United States Navy	Portland	heavy cruiser	9,800	15 November 1932	sunk 30 July 1945
Ibuki	Imperial Japanese Navy	Ibuki	heavy cruiser	12,030	Never commissioned	launched 21 May 1943, converted to light aircraft carrier December 1943, scrapped 22 September 1946
Ioshima	Imperial Japanese Navy	Ioshima	light cruiser	2,200	10 June 1944	sunk 23 September 1937 as Ning Hai, raised by Japan in 1938, reclassified as Kaibōkan in 1944, sunk by USS Shad on 19 September 1944
Isuzu	Imperial Japanese Navy	Nagara	light cruiser	5,088	15 August 1923	sunk 7 April 1945
Iwate	Imperial Japanese Navy	Izumo	armoured cruiser	9,274	18 March 1901	sunk 25 July 1945, scrapped 1946-1947
Izumo	Imperial Japanese Navy	Izumo	armoured cruiser	9,353	25 September 1900	sunk 28 July 1945, scrapped 1947
Jacob van Heemskerk	Royal Netherlands Navy	Tromp	flotilla leader	4,064	16 September 1939	decommissioned 1969
Jamaica	Royal Navy	Crown Colony (Fiji)	light cruiser	8,530	29 June 1942	scrapped 1960
Java	Royal Netherlands Navy	Java	light cruiser	6,670	1 May 1925	sunk 27 February 1942
Jean de Vienne	French Navy	La Galissonnière	light cruiser	7,600	10 February 1937	scuttled 27 November 1942
Jeanne d'Arc	French Navy; Free French Naval Forces		training cruiser	6,496	14 August 1931	scrapped 1965
Jintsu	Imperial Japanese Navy	Sendai	light cruiser	7,100	31 July 1925	sunk 13 July 1943
Juneau	United States Navy	Atlanta	light cruiser	6,718	14 February 1942	sunk 13 November 1942
Kaganovich	Soviet Navy	Kirov (Project 26bis2)	light cruiser	8,267	6 December 1944	renamed as Lazar Kaganovich 3 August 1945, later as Petropavlovsk 3 August 1957, scrapped 1960s
Kako	Imperial Japanese Navy	Furutaka	heavy cruiser	7,100	31 July 1926	sunk 10 August 1942
Kalinin	Soviet Navy	Kirov (Project 26bis2)	light cruiser	8,267	31 December 1942	struck 12 April 1963
Karlsruhe	Kriegsmarine	Königsberg	light cruiser	7,700	6 November 1929	sunk 9 April 1940
Kashii	Imperial Japanese Navy	Katori	light cruiser	5,890	15 July 1941	sunk 12 January 1945
Kashima	Imperial Japanese Navy	Katori	light cruiser	5,890	31 May 1940	struck 5 October 1945, scrapped 1947
Kasuga	Imperial Japanese Navy	Giuseppe Garibaldi	armoured cruiser	7,578	7 January 1904	sunk 18 July 1945, salvaged and scrapped 1948
Katori	Imperial Japanese Navy	Katori	light cruiser	5,890	20 April 1940	sunk 18 February 1944
Kent	Royal Navy	County (Kent)	heavy cruiser	9,850	25 June 1928	scrapped 1948
Kenya	Royal Navy	Crown Colony (Fiji)	light cruiser	8,530	27 September 1940	scrapped 1962
Kinu	Imperial Japanese Navy	Nagara	light cruiser	5,088	10 November 1922	sunk by USN aircraft, Sibuyan Sea 26 October 1944
Kinugasa	Imperial Japanese Navy	Aoba	heavy cruiser	8,300	30 September 1927	sunk 14 November 1942
Kirov	Soviet Navy	Kirov (Project 26)	light cruiser	7,765	23 September 1938	sold for scrap 22 February 1974
Kiso	Imperial Japanese Navy	Kuma	light cruiser	5,100	4 May 1921	sunk 13 November 1944
Kitakami	Imperial Japanese Navy	Kuma	light cruiser	5,100	15 April 1921	struck 30 November 1945, scrapped 1946-1947
Köln	Kriegsmarine	Königsberg	light cruiser	7,700	15 January 1930	sunk 3 March 1945
Königsberg	Kriegsmarine	Königsberg	light cruiser	7,700	17 April 1929	sunk 10 April 1940
Komintern	Soviet Navy	Bogatyr	light cruiser	6,340	July 1905	sunk as breakwater 10 October 1942
Krasny Kavkaz	Soviet Navy	Admiral Nakhimov	light cruiser	7,441	25 January 1932	sunk as a target 1950s
Krasny Krym	Soviet Navy	Svetlana	light cruiser	6,731	1 July 1928	scrapped 1959
Kronshtadt	Soviet Navy	Kronshtadt	heavy cruiser	39,034	Never commissioned	laid down 30 November 1939, 10.6% complete June 1941, scrapped 24 March 1947
Kreuzer M	Kriegsmarine	M	light cruiser	8,366	Never commissioned	laid down 1 November 1938, broken up on slip 1942–1943
Kreuzer N	Kriegsmarine	M	light cruiser	8,366	Never commissioned	laid down 1938, broken up on slip 1942–1943
Kreuzer O	Kriegsmarine	M	light cruiser	8,366	Never commissioned	laid down 10 March 1939, broken up on slip 1942–1943
Kuma	Imperial Japanese Navy	Kuma	light cruiser	5,100	31 August 1920	sunk 11 January 1944
Kumano	Imperial Japanese Navy	Mogami	heavy cruiser	13,440	31 October 1937	sunk 15 November 1944
La Argentina	Argentine Navy		light cruiser	6,500	12 April 1939	discarded 1974
La Galissonnière	French Navy	La Galissonnière	light cruiser	7,600	1 January 1936	scuttled 27 November 1942
Lamotte-Picquet	French Navy	Duguay-Trouin	light cruiser	7,249	5 March 1927	sunk 12 January 1945
Latona	Royal Navy	Abdiel	minelayer cruiser	2,650	4 May 1941	sunk 25 October 1941
Leander	Royal New Zealand Navy	Leander	light cruiser	6,985	24 March 1933	returned to UK 8 May 1944, scrapped 1950
Leipzig	Kriegsmarine	Leipzig	light cruiser	8,000	8 October 1931	scuttled 11 July 1946
Little Rock	United States Navy	Cleveland	light cruiser	11,744	17 June 1945	converted to missile cruiser 1960, preserved as museum ship since 1 June 1977
Liverpool	Royal Navy	Town (Gloucester)	light cruiser	9,400	2 November 1938	paid off 1952
London	Royal Navy	County (London)	heavy cruiser	9,850	31 January 1929	scrapped 22 January 1950
Los Angeles	United States Navy	Baltimore	heavy cruiser	13,600	22 July 1945	decommissioned 1963, scrapped 1975
Louisville	United States Navy	Northampton	heavy cruiser	9,200	15 January 1931	scrapped 1959
Luigi Cadorna	Regia Marina	Condottieri (Cadorna)	light cruiser	5,239	11 August 1933	scrapped 1951
Luigi di Savoia Duca degli Abruzzi	Regia Marina	Condottieri (Duca degli Abruzzi)	light cruiser	11,170	1 December 1937	decommissioned January 1961, scrapped 1972
Macon	United States Navy	Baltimore	heavy cruiser	13,600	26 August 1945	decommissioned 1961, scrapped 1973
Manchester	Royal Navy	Town (Gloucester)	light cruiser	9,400	4 August 1938	scuttled 13 August 1942
Manxman	Royal Navy	Abdiel	minelayer cruiser	2,650	20 June 1941	scrapped October 1972
Marblehead	United States Navy	Omaha	light cruiser	7,050	8 September 1924	scrapped 1946
Mariscal Sucre	Bolivarian Navy of Venezuela	Isla de Luzón	protected cruiser	970	22 September 1887	scrapped 1940
Marseillaise	French Navy	La Galissonniere	light cruiser	7,600	10 October 1937	scuttled 27 November 1942
Mauritius	Royal Navy	Crown Colony (Fiji)	light cruiser	8,530	4 January 1941	scrapped 1965
Maxim Gorky	Soviet Navy	Kirov (Project 26bis)	light cruiser	8,048	12 December 1940	sold for scrap 18 April 1959
Maya	Imperial Japanese Navy	Takao	heavy cruiser	13,350	30 June 1932	Sunk 23 October 1944
Mecidiye	Turkish Navy		protected cruiser	3,485	19 December 1903	paid off 1 March 1947, scrapped 1952-1956
Medusa	Kriegsmarine	Gazelle	light cruiser	2,617	26 July 1901	scuttled 3 May 1945, scrapped 1948-1950
Memphis	United States Navy	Omaha	light cruiser	7,050	17 December 1925	scrapped 1947
Méndez Núñez	Spanish Navy	Blas de Lezo	light cruiser	4,780	30 August 1924	struck 1963
Miami	United States Navy	Cleveland	light cruiser	11,744	28 December 1943	sold for scrap 20 July 1962
Miguel de Cervantes	Spanish Navy	Almirante Cervera	light cruiser	7,475	10 February 1930	stricken 1964
Mikuma	Imperial Japanese Navy	Mogami	heavy cruiser	13,440	29 August 1935	sunk 6 June 1942
Milwaukee	United States Navy; Soviet Navy	Omaha	light cruiser	7,050	20 June 1923	loaned to USSR as Murmansk 20 April 1944; returned 16 March 1949; scrapped 10 December 1949
Minneapolis	United States Navy	New Orleans	heavy cruiser	9,950	19 May 1934	Decommissioned 10 February 1947, scrapped 1959
Mobile	United States Navy	Cleveland	light cruiser	11,744	24 March 1943	sold for scrap 16 December 1959
Mogami	Imperial Japanese Navy	Mogami	heavy cruiser	12,400	28 July 1935	Sunk 25 October 1944
Molotov	Soviet Navy	Kirov (Project 26bis)	light cruiser	8,048	14 January 1941	renamed Slava 3 August 1957, sold for scrap 4 April 1972
Montcalm	French Navy; Free French Naval Forces	La Galissonniere	light cruiser	7,600	15 November 1937	Decommissioned 1 May 1957
Montpelier	United States Navy	Cleveland	light cruiser	11,744	9 September 1942	sold for scrap 22 January 1960
Muzio Attendolo	Regia Marina	Condottieri (Montecuccoli)	light cruiser	7,405	7 August 1935	sunk 4 December 1942
Myōkō	Imperial Japanese Navy	Myōkō	heavy cruiser	13,380	31 July 1929	scuttled by Royal Navy 8 June 1946
Naiad	Royal Navy	Dido	light cruiser	5,600	24 July 1940	sunk 11 March 1942
Nachi	Imperial Japanese Navy	Myōkō	heavy cruiser	13,380	28 November 1928	sunk 5 November 1944
Nagara	Imperial Japanese Navy	Nagara	light cruiser	5,088	21 April 1922	lost 7 August 1944
Naka	Imperial Japanese Navy	Sendai	light cruiser	7,100	30 November 1925	sunk 17 February 1944
Nashville	United States Navy	Brooklyn	light cruiser	9,767	6 June 1938	to Chile as Capitán Prat January 1951, scrapped 1985
Natori	Imperial Japanese Navy	Nagara	light cruiser	5,088	15 September 1922	lost 18 August 1944
Navarra	Spanish Navy		light cruiser	5,502	15 January 1920	retired 1956
Neptune	Royal Navy	Leander	light cruiser	7,000	23 February 1934	lost 19 December 1941
New Orleans	United States Navy	New Orleans	heavy cruiser	9,950	12 April 1933	Decommissioned 10 February 1947, scrapped 1959
Newcastle	Royal Navy	Town (Southampton)	light cruiser	9,100	5 March 1937	scrapped August 1959
Newfoundland	Royal Navy	Crown Colony (Ceylon)	light cruiser	8,530	21 January 1943	to Peru as BAP Almirante Grau 1959, scrapped 1979
Nigeria	Royal Navy	Crown Colony (Fiji)	light cruiser	8,530	23 September 1940	to India as INS Mysore 29 August 1957, decommissioned 1985
Niobe	Kriegsmarine	Holland	anti-aircraft cruiser	4,100	15 July 1900	captured from Dutch as Gelderland 17 May 1940, sunk 16 July 1944
Norfolk	Royal Navy	County (Norfolk)	heavy cruiser	10,035	30 April 1930	scrapped 1950
Northampton	United States Navy	Northampton	heavy cruiser	9,050	17 May 1930	lost 1 December 1942
Noshiro	Imperial Japanese Navy	Agano	light cruiser	6,547	30 June 1943	sunk 26 October 1944
Nürnberg	Kriegsmarine	Leipzig	light cruiser	8,900	2 November 1935	transferred to Soviet Union as Admiral Makarov 1945, scrapped 1960
O'Higgins	Chilean Navy		armoured cruiser	7,796	2 April 1898	scrapped 1958
Oakland	United States Navy	Atlanta (Oakland)	light cruiser	6,718	17 July 1943	decommissioned 1949, scrapped 1959
Ōi	Imperial Japanese Navy	Kuma	light cruiser	5,100	10 October 1921	sunk 19 July 1944
Oklahoma City	United States Navy	Cleveland	light cruiser	11,744	22 December 1944	converted to missile cruiser 1960, sunk as target 1999
Oltul	Royal Romanian Navy	Bistrița	coastguard cruiser	100	1888	Used as river gunboat after the war, scrapped 1950's
Omaha	United States Navy	Omaha	light cruiser	7,050	24 February 1923	Scrapped February 1946
Ontario	Royal Canadian Navy	Minotaur	light cruiser	8,800	25 May 1945	laid up 15 October 1958
Orion	Royal Navy	Leander	light cruiser	7,000	18 January 1934	scrapped 1949
Ottaviano Augusto	Regia Marina	Capitani Romani	flotilla leader	3,750	Never commissioned	launched 28 April 1941, captured by Germany and never completed, sunk 1 November 1943
Ōyodo	Imperial Japanese Navy	Ōyodo	light cruiser	11,433	28 February 1943	sunk 25 July 1945
Paolo Emilio	Regia Marina	Capitani Romani	flotilla leader	3,750	Never commissioned	laid down 12 October 1939, construction stopped June 1940, scrapped 1941-1942
Pasadena	United States Navy	Cleveland	light cruiser	11,744	8 June 1944	sold for scrap 5 July 1972
Penelope	Royal Navy	Arethusa	light cruiser	5,270	13 November 1936	sunk 18 February 1944
Pensacola	United States Navy	Pensacola	heavy cruiser	9,100	6 February 1930	sunk as target 1948
Perth	Royal Australian Navy	Leander (Amphion)	light cruiser	6,980	29 June 1939	former HMS Amphion; sunk 1 March 1942
Peyk-i Şevket	Turkish Navy	Peyk-i Şevket	torpedo cruiser	775	13 November 1907	Scrapped 1953
Petropavlovsk	Soviet Navy	Admiral Hipper	heavy cruiser	14,680	Never commissioned	fought incomplete in siege of Leningrad, renamed as Tallinn 1 September 1944, converted to training ship as Dniepr March 1953, scrapped late 1950's
Philadelphia	United States Navy	Brooklyn	light cruiser	9,767	23 September 1937	to Brazil as Barroso January 1951, scrapped 1974
Phoebe	Royal Navy	Dido	light cruiser	5,600	27 September 1940	scrapped 1956
Phoenix	United States Navy	Brooklyn	light cruiser	9,767	3 October 1938	to Argentina as ARA General Belgrano April 1951, sunk 2 May 1982
Pittsburgh	United States Navy	Baltimore	heavy cruiser	13,600	10 October 1944	decommissioned 1956, scrapped 1974
Pluton	French Navy		minelayer cruiser	5,200	25 January 1932	lost 13 September 1939
Pola	Regia Marina	Zara	heavy cruiser	11,730	21 December 1932	sunk 28 March 1941
Pompeo Magno	Regia Marina	Capitani Romani	flotilla leader	3,750	4 June 1943	renamed San Giorgio 1 July 1955, scrapped 1980
Portland	United States Navy	Portland	heavy cruiser	9,950	23 February 1933	decommissioned 1946, scrapped 1959
Portsmouth	United States Navy	Cleveland	light cruiser	11,744	25 June 1945	sold for scrap 26 February 1974
Primauguet	French Navy	Duguay-Trouin	light cruiser	7,249	1 April 1927	scuttled 8 November 1942, scrapped 1951
Prinz Eugen	Kriegsmarine	Admiral Hipper	heavy cruiser	16,700	1 August 1940	to United States as USS Prinz Eugen (IX-300) 5 January 1946, used as target in nuclear tests, capsized 22 December 1946
Providence	United States Navy	Cleveland	light cruiser	11,744	15 May 1945	converted to missile cruiser 1959, scrapped 1980
Pueyrredón	Argentine Navy	Giuseppe Garibaldi	armoured cruiser	6,100	4 August 1898	struck 2 August 1954, sold for scrap 1957
Quincy (CA-39)	United States Navy	New Orleans	heavy cruiser	9,375	9 June 1936	sunk 9 August 1942
Quincy (CA-71)	United States Navy	Baltimore	heavy cruiser	13,600	15 December 1943	decommissioned 1954, scrapped 1974
Raimondo Montecuccoli	Regia Marina	Condottieri (Montecuccoli)	light cruiser	7,405	30 June 1935	decommissioned 1964
Raleigh	United States Navy	Omaha	light cruiser	7,050	6 February 1924	scrapped 1946
Reno	United States Navy	Atlanta (Oakland)	light cruiser	6,718	28 December 1943	decommissioned 1946, scrapped 1962
Richmond	United States Navy	Omaha	light cruiser	7,050	2 July 1923	scrapped 1946
Rio Grande do Sul	Brazilian Navy	Bahia	scout cruiser	3,050	14 May 1910	scrapped 1948
Royalist	Royal Navy	Dido (Bellona)	light cruiser	5,950	10 September 1943	scrapped 1968
Sakawa	Imperial Japanese Navy	Agano	light cruiser	6,547	30 November 1944	sunk as target 2 July 1946
Salt Lake City	United States Navy	Pensacola	heavy cruiser	9,100	11 December 1929	sunk as target 1948
San Diego	United States Navy	Atlanta	light cruiser	6,718	10 January 1942	decommissioned 1946, scrapped 1960
San Francisco	United States Navy	New Orleans	heavy cruiser	9,950	10 February 1934	Decommissioned 10 February 1946, scrapped 1959
San Giorgio	Regia Marina	San Giorgio	heavy cruiser	10,167	1 July 1910	decommissioned 22 January 1941
San Juan	United States Navy	Atlanta	light cruiser	6,718	28 February 1942	decommissioned 1946, scrapped 1961
Santa Fe	United States Navy	Cleveland	light cruiser	11,744	24 November 1942	sold for scrap 9 November 1959
Savannah	United States Navy	Brooklyn	light cruiser	9,767	10 March 1938	decommissioned 1947, scrapped 1966
Scipione Africano	Regia Marina	Capitani Romani	flotilla leader	3,750	23 April 1943	ceded to France as Guichen 1948, scrapped 1982
Scylla	Royal Navy	Dido	light cruiser	5,600	12 June 1942	scrapped 1950
Seattle	United States Navy	Tennessee	armored cruiser	14,500	7 August 1906	decommissioned 1946, sold for scrap 1946
Sendai	Imperial Japanese Navy	Sendai	light cruiser	5,195	29 April 1924	sunk 2 November 1943
Sevastopol	Soviet Navy	Kronshtadt	heavy cruiser	39,034	Never commissioned	laid down 5 November 1939, 11.6% complete June 1941, scrapped 24 March 1947
Seydlitz	Kriegsmarine	Admiral Hipper	heavy cruiser	15,910	Never commissioned	launched January 1939, construction stopped at 95% completion, converted to aircraft carrier as Weser March 1942, scuttled incomplete 29 January 1945
Sheffield	Royal Navy	Town (Southampton)	light cruiser	9,100	25 August 1937	scrapped 1967
Shropshire	Royal Navy; Royal Australian Navy	County (London)	heavy cruiser	9,850	24 September 1929	to Australia 20 April 1943, paid off 10 November 1949, scrapped 20 January 1955
Siretul	Royal Romanian Navy	Bistrița	coastguard cruiser	100	1888	Used as river gunboat after the war, scrapped 1950's
Sirius	Royal Navy	Dido	light cruiser	5,600	6 May 1942	scrapped 1956
Sussex	Royal Navy	County (London)	heavy cruiser	9,850	19 March 1929	scrapped February 1950
Southampton	Royal Navy	Town (Southampton)	light cruiser	9,100	6 March 1937	scuttled 11 January 1941
Spartan	Royal Navy	Dido (Bellona)	light cruiser	5,950	12 July 1943	sunk 29 January 1944
Springfield	United States Navy	Cleveland	light cruiser	11,744	9 September 1944	converted to missile cruiser 1960, decommissioned 1974, scrapped 1980
St. Louis	United States Navy	Brooklyn (St. Louis)	light cruiser	10,000	19 May 1939	to Brazil as Tamandaré January 1951, sunk under tow 1980
Saint Paul	United States Navy	Baltimore	heavy cruiser	13,600	17 February 1945	decommissioned 1971, scrapped 1980
SP1	Kriegsmarine	Spähkreuzer	scout cruiser	5,700	Never commissioned	laid down 30 August 1941, broken up on slip by 31 July 1943
Suffolk	Royal Navy	County (Kent)	heavy cruiser	9,850	31 May 1928	scrapped 1948
Suffren	French Navy; Free French Naval Forces	Suffren	heavy cruiser	9,940	1 January 1930	scrapped 1974
Sumatra	Royal Netherlands Navy	Java	light cruiser	6,670	26 May 1926	scuttled 9 June 1944 as Gooseberry breakwater blockship, sold for scrap 14 February 1951
Superb	Royal Navy	Minotaur	light cruiser	8,800	16 November 1945	paid off 1957, scrapped 1960
Suzuya	Imperial Japanese Navy	Mogami	heavy cruiser	15,900	31 October 1937	sunk 25 October 1944
Swiftsure	Royal Navy	Minotaur	light cruiser	8,800	22 June 1944	paid off 1958, scrapped 1962
Sydney	Royal Australian Navy	Leander (Amphion)	light cruiser	6,980	24 September 1935	sunk 19 November 1941
Takao	Imperial Japanese Navy	Takao	heavy cruiser	13,160	31 May 1932	Sunk 31 July 1945
Tama	Imperial Japanese Navy	Kuma	light cruiser	5,100	29 January 1921	sunk 25 October 1944
Taranto	Regia Marina	Magdeburg	light cruiser	3,184	2 June 1925	former German Strassburg; scuttled 23 September 1943
Tatsuta	Imperial Japanese Navy	Tenryu	light cruiser	4,350	31 May 1919	Sunk 13 March 1944
Tenryū	Imperial Japanese Navy	Tenryu	light cruiser	4,350	20 November 1919	Sunk 18 December 1942
Tokiwa	Imperial Japanese Navy	Asama	armoured cruiser	9,514	19 May 1899	sunk 9 August 1945, scrapped 1947
Toledo	United States Navy	Baltimore	heavy cruiser	13,600	27 October 1946	decommissioned 1960, scrapped 1974
Tone	Imperial Japanese Navy	Tone	heavy cruiser	15,200	30 November 1938	sunk 14 July 1945
Topeka	United States Navy	Cleveland	light cruiser	11,744	23 December 1944	converted to missile cruiser 1960, scrapped 1975
Tourville	French Navy; Free French Naval Forces	Duquesne	heavy cruiser	10,000	1 December 1928	scrapped 1963
Trento	Regia Marina	Trento	heavy cruiser	10,511	3 April 1929	sunk 14 June 1942
Trenton	United States Navy	Omaha	light cruiser	7,050	19 April 1924	scrapped 1946
Trieste	Regia Marina	Trento	heavy cruiser	10,511	21 December 1928	sunk 1943
Trinidad	Royal Navy	Crown Colony (Fiji)	light cruiser	8,530	14 October 1941	sunk 15 May 1942
Tromp	Royal Netherlands Navy	Tromp	flotilla leader	3,404	18 August 1938	decommissioned 1955
Tucson	United States Navy	Atlanta (Oakland)	light cruiser	6,718	3 February 1945	decommissioned 1949, scrapped 1971
Tuscaloosa	United States Navy	New Orleans	heavy cruiser	9,950	17 August 1934	Decommissioned 13 February 1946, scrapped 1959
Uganda	Royal Navy; Royal Canadian Navy	Crown Colony (Ceylon)	light cruiser	8,530	3 January 1943	transferred to RCN 21 October 1944, scrapped 1961
Ulpio Traiano	Regia Marina	Capitani Romani	flotilla leader	3,750	Never commissioned	launched 30 November 1942, sunk 3 January 1943
Veinticinco de Mayo	Argentine Navy	Veinticinco de Mayo	heavy cruiser	6,800	18 July 1931	scrapped 1962
Vesuvio	Regia Marina	Etna	light cruiser	5,900	Never commissioned	originally ordered by Royal Thai Navy in 1938 as Naresuan, requisitioned by Italy in 1941, never completed
Vicksburg	United States Navy	Cleveland	light cruiser	11,744	12 June 1944	sold for scrap 25 August 1964
Vincennes (CA-44)	United States Navy	New Orleans	heavy cruiser	9,400	24 February 1937	sunk 9 August 1942
Vincennes (CL-64)	United States Navy	Cleveland	light cruiser	11,744	21 January 1944	sunk as target 28 October 1969
Vipsanio Agrippa	Regia Marina	Capitani Romani	flotilla leader	3,750	Never commissioned	laid down October 1939, construction stopped June 1940, scrapped 1941-1942
Voroshilov	Soviet Navy	Kirov (Project 26)	light cruiser	7,770	20 June 1940	sold for scrap 2 March 1973
Welshman	Royal Navy	Abdiel	minelayer cruiser	2,650	25 August 1941	sunk 1 February 1943
Wichita	United States Navy		heavy cruiser	10,589	16 February 1939	decommissioned 1947, scrapped 1959
Wilkes-Barre	United States Navy	Cleveland	light cruiser	11,744	1 July 1944	sunk as target 13 May 1972
Yahagi (1911)	Imperial Japanese Navy	Chikuma	protected cruiser	5,040	27 July 1912	stricken 1 April 1940, scrapped 31 January 1947
Yahagi (1942)	Imperial Japanese Navy	Agano	light cruiser	6,547	29 December 1943	sunk 7 April 1945
Yakumo	Imperial Japanese Navy		armoured cruiser	9,494	20 June 1900	scrapped 1 April 1947
Yasoshima	Imperial Japanese Navy	Ioshima	light cruiser	2,200	25 September 1944	sunk 23 September 1937 as Ping Hai, raised by Japan in 1938, reclassified as Kaibōkan in 1944, sunk by US aircraft on 25 November 1944
Yat Sen	Republic of China Navy		light cruiser	1,624	10 October 1934	sold for scrap 19 May 1959
Ying Rui	Republic of China Navy	Chao Ho	protected cruiser	2,460	2 December 1911	sunk 25 October 1937
Yodo	Imperial Japanese Navy	Yodo	protected cruiser	1,270	8 April 1908	stricken 1 April 1940, scrapped 1945
York	Royal Navy	York	heavy cruiser	8,250	1 May 1930	constructive loss 26 March 1941, scrapped 1952
Yūbari	Imperial Japanese Navy		light cruiser	2,840	23 July 1923	sunk 28 April 1944
Yura	Imperial Japanese Navy	Nagara	light cruiser	5,088	20 March 1923	lost 25 October 1942
Zara	Regia Marina	Zara	heavy cruiser	11,500	20 October 1931	sunk 29 March 1941

== See also ==
- List of cruisers of World War I
