= Lima Declaration =

Lima Declaration or Declaration of Lima may refer to:

- Declaration of Lima (1938), a part of the Good Neighbor policy in Latin America
- Lima Declaration on Industrial Development and Cooperation (1975) that established the UNIDO
- Lima Declaration (2011) by the Global Alliance for Banking on Values
- Declaracion de Lima (2011) of the Pacific Alliance
- Lima Declaration (2017) that established the Lima Group

== See also ==
- Treaty of Lima
