= BAP Almirante Grau (1906) =

Scout cruiser of the Peruvian Navy

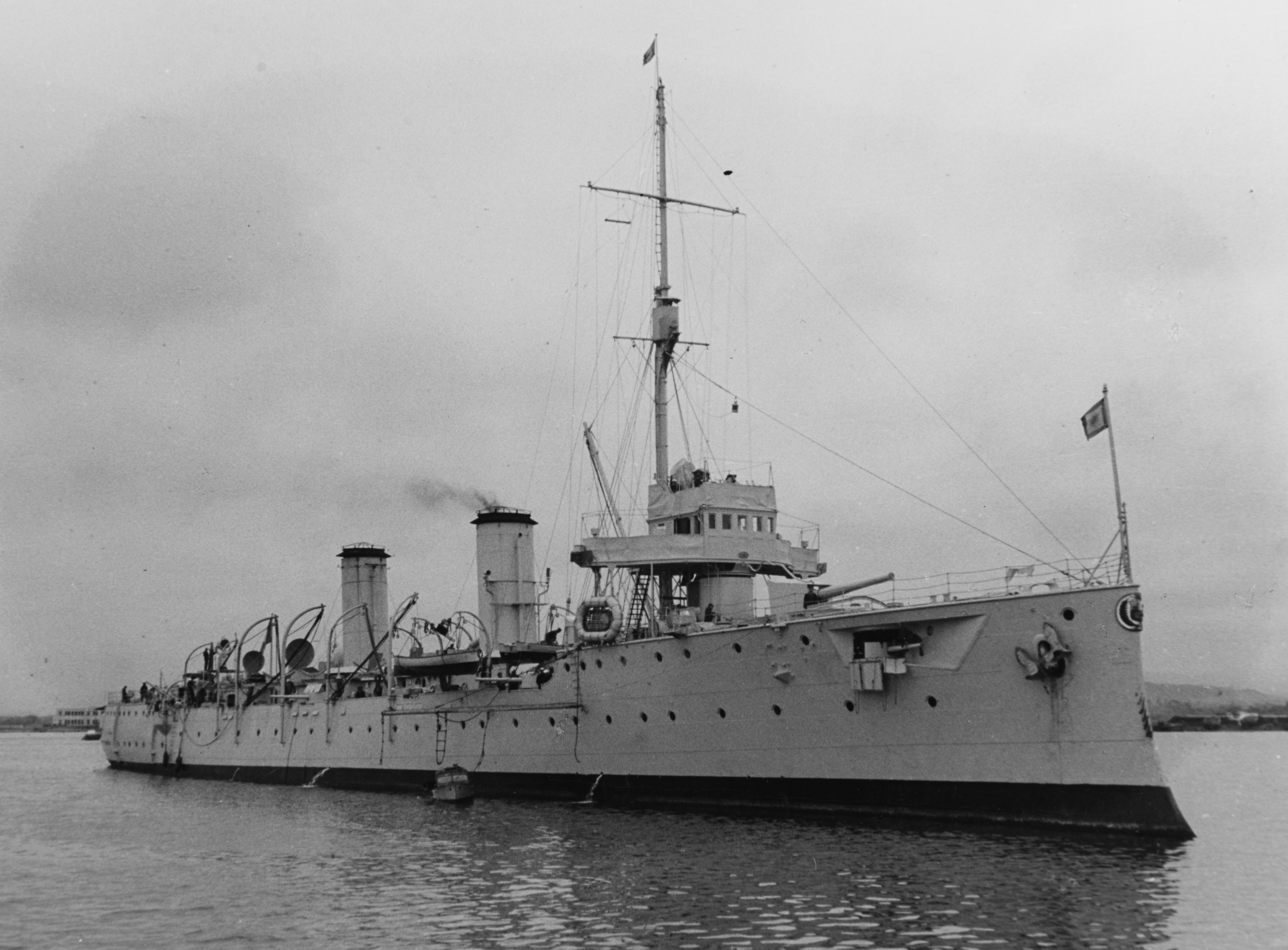
- Almirante Grau

History

Peru
- Name: Almirante Grau
- Namesake: Miguel Grau Seminario
- Ordered: 1905
- Builder: Vickers Limited, Barrow
- Laid down: 1905
- Launched: 27 March 1906
- Commissioned: 1907
- Decommissioned: 1958
- Fate: Stricken 24 June 1958

General characteristics (As built)
- Type: Scout cruiser
- Displacement: 3,100 long tons (3,150 t) Normal
- Length: 115.82 m (380 ft) oa
- Beam: 12.34 m (40 ft 6 in)
- Draught: 4.3 m (14 ft 3 in)
- Installed power: 14,000 ihp (10,000 kW)
- Propulsion: 2 shafts, triple-expansion steam engines
- Speed: 24 kn (44 km/h; 28 mph)
- Range: 3,276 nmi (6,067 km; 3,770 mi) at 10 km (6.2 mi)
- Complement: 320
- Armament: 2 × 6 in (152 mm) guns; 8 × 14-pounder (76 mm) guns; 8 × 3-pounder (47 mm) guns; 2 × 18 in (450 mm) torpedo tubes
- Armour: Deck: 38 mm (1 1/2 in); Conning tower: 76 mm (3 in); Gun shields:76 mm (3 in)

BAP Almirante Grau was a scout cruiser of the Peruvian Navy, the lead ship of its class. Along with its sister ship Coronel Bolognesi, Almirante Grau was one of Peru's two most powerful warships for the first half of the twentieth century. The ship was named for Miguel Grau Seminario, a naval hero of the country.

== Historical data ==
=== Background ===
During the presidency of Marshal Ramón Castilla, the Peruvian Navy was considered one of the most powerful in America, but as a consequence of the Pacific War warships were lost in action or sunk by their crews to prevent them from being captured by the enemy.

To remedy this situation, Peru acquired a couple of transports: Vilcanota (1884) and Perú (1885). In 1888, the cruiser Lima arrived in Callao, acquired during the conflict with Chile and retained by The United Kingdom during the conflict. In the following years, the Chalaco and Constitución (1894) and Iquitos (1905) transports were incorporated; however, already well into the 20th century, several of these units were decommissioned. Also at this time, Peru was facing conflicts with Chile and Ecuador, which motivated the patriotic, board to raise money to acquire new naval units.

=== Construction and arrival in Peru ===
In 1904, the Peruvian president José Pardo y Barreda authorized the acquisition of the two twin cruisers, which would bear the names Almirante Grau and BAP Coronel Bolognesi, commissioning the English company Vickers Sons Armstrong & Maxim Limited for their construction, which was carried out in the shipyards of Barrow in Furness.

The Admiral Grau was launched on 27 March 1906, and sailed in convoy together with the Coronel Bolognesi to the port of Callao, arriving on 10 August 1907.

"Colonel Bolognesi" and her twin were for many years the pride of the Peruvian Navy. Its construction had been supervised by Rear Admiral Melitón Carvajal Ambulodegui, who would be the architect of the reconstruction of the Peruvian fleet. Both units still featured many elements of the protected cruiser, but were more robust, better armed and, had greater range than the slightly slower contemporary British scouts.

The Grau class became excellent units. Although they periodically had to undergo revision and maintenance work, for half a century, they were the most well-known ships of the Peruvian Navy. Of the various partial modernizations to which they were subjected during their operational life, the most significant was the one carried out in 1935 with the emplacement of several anti-aircraft weapons. During World War II, the bridge was rebuilt and the traditional mast was replaced by a tripod one.

=== Official visit to Chile ===
In 1930, he was part of the entourage that would leave together with the cruiser Coronel Bolognesi and the submarines R-1 , R-2, R-3 and R-4 towards the Chilean port of Valparaíso, on an official visit on the occasion of the signing of the Treaty of Lima signed between Peru and Chile.

=== Naval Actions ===
==== 1932 Northeast Military Campaign ====
In 1932, the cruiser received her baptism of fire, intervening in the conflict with Colombia, together with the submarines R- 1 and R-4, sailing across the Atlantic and entering the Amazon River. She there she faced mercenaries hired by the Colombian State.

==== 1941 North and Northeast Military Campaign ====
In April 1941, Almirant Grau scuttled the German merchant München with gunfire after the vessel was set ablaze by the British armed merchant cruiser HMCS Prince Henry.

At the outbreak of the conflict with Ecuador in 1941, this cruiser, along with the destroyer Almirante Guise, was completing its annual run and careening in the Callao Naval Base, heading towards Paita on 23 July, joining the theater of operations.

With its base in Zorritos, it carried out operations, without withdrawing to the base in Callao, since it would take part, with the other ships of the Squadron, in carrying out patrols in northern Peru due to the Second World War.

=== Decommissioning ===
After more than 50 years of service, she was discharged in 1958 along with her twin, Colonel Bolognesi .

== Bibliography ==
- Fisher, Edward C. Jr. (1975). "50 Years of Service: The Story of Peru's Coronel Bolognesi and Almirante Grau". Warship International. XII (4): 319–330. ISSN 0043-0374.
- Scheina, Robert L. (1985). "Peru". In Gray, Randal (ed.). Conway's All the World's Fighting Ships 1906–1921. Naval Institute Press. pp. 409–410. ISBN 0-87021-907-3. OCLC 12119866.
