= BAP Coronel Bolognesi (1906) =

1906 Almirante Grau-class cruiser

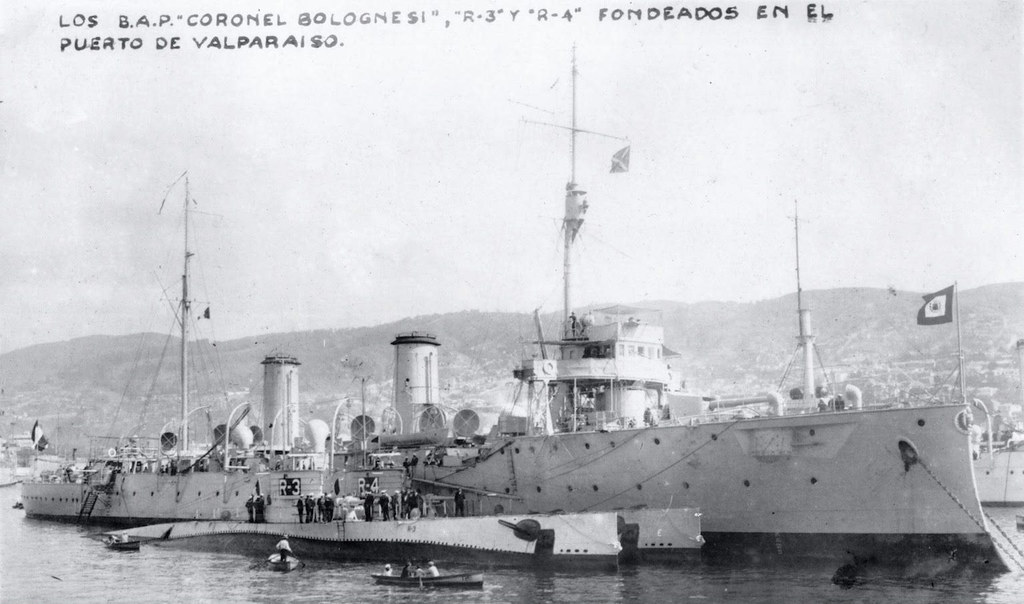
- Coronel Bolognesi in Valparaiso, Chile

History

Peru
- Name: Coronel Bolognesi
- Namesake: Francisco Bolognesi
- Ordered: 1905
- Builder: Vickers Limited, Barrow
- Laid down: 1905
- Launched: 24 September 1906
- Commissioned: 1907
- Decommissioned: 1958
- Fate: Stricken 1958

General characteristics (As built)
- Type: Scout cruiser
- Displacement: 3,100 long tons (3,150 t) Normal
- Length: 115.82 m (380 ft) oa
- Beam: 12.34 m (40 ft 6 in)
- Draught: 4.34 m (14 ft 3 in)
- Installed power: 14,000 ihp (10,000 kW)
- Propulsion: 2 shafts, triple-expansion steam engines
- Speed: 24 kn (44 km/h; 28 mph)
- Range: 3,276 nmi (6,067 km; 3,770 mi) at 10 km (6.2 mi)
- Complement: 320
- Armament: 2 × 6 in (152 mm) guns; 8 × 14-pounder (76 mm) guns; 8 × 3-pounder (47 mm) guns; 2 × 18 in (450 mm) torpedo tubes
- Armour: Deck: 38 mm (1 1/2 in); Conning tower: 76 mm (3 in); Gun shields:76 mm (3 in)

BAP Coronel Bolognesi was a scout cruiser of the Peruvian Navy, the lead ship of its class. Along with her sister ship Almirante Grau, Coronel Bolognesi was one of Peru's two most powerful warships for the first half of the twentieth century. The ship was named for Francisco Bolognesi, a hero of the country for his service in the War of the Pacific.

== Background ==
In the time of Grand Marshal Ramón Castilla, the Peruvian Navy was considered one of the most powerful in America, but as a consequence of the guano and saltpeter war, the remaining warships of the Peruvian Navy were sunk by their crews to prevent them from being captured by the enemy.

To put an end to this situation, Peru acquired a pair of transports: the Vilcanota (1884) and the Perú (1885). in 1888, the Lima arrived in Callao, acquired during the conflict with Chile and retained by Great Britain. In the following years, the Iquitos, Chalaco, Santa Rosa and Constitución transports were incorporated; However, as the 20th century began, several of these units were decommissioned. Also at this time, Peru had to face conflicts with Chile and Ecuador, which motivated the patriotic boards to raise money to acquire new naval units.

== Construction and arrival in Peru ==
in 1904, the Peruvian president José Pardo y Barreda authorized the acquisition of the two twin cruisers, which would bear the names of Almirante Grau and Coronel Bolognesi, commissioning the English company Vickers Sons Armstrong & Maxim Limited to construct them, which was carried out at the Barrow-in-Furness shipyards.

Colonel Bolognesi was launched on September 24, 1906, and set sail in convoy with the Admiral Grau to the port of Callao, arriving on August 10, 1907.

Colonel Bolognesi and her twin were for many years the pride of the Peruvian Navy. Their construction had been supervised by Rear Admiral Melitón Carvajal Ambulodegui, who would be the architect of the reconstruction of the Peruvian fleet. The two units still featured many elements of the protected cruiser, but they were stronger, better gunned and had greater autonomy than the slightly slower contemporary British scouts.

The Grau turned out to be excellent units, although they periodically had to undergo inspection and maintenance work, and for half a century they were the most representative ships of the Peruvian Navy. Of the various partial modernizations to which they were subjected during their operational life, the most significant was the one carried out in 1935 with the installation of several anti-aircraft weapons. During World War II, the bridge was rebuilt and the forward mast was replaced with a tripod one.

== State visit to Chile ==
In 1930, she was part of the delegation that would leave together with the cruiser Almirante Grau and the submarines R-1, R-2, R-3 and R-4 towards the Chilean port of Valparaíso, on an official visit on the occasion of the signing of the Treaty of Lima between Peru and Chile.

== Naval battles ==
Northeast military campaign of 1932

In 1932, the cruiser would receive its baptism of fire, intervening in the Colombia–Peru War, along with the submarines R-2 and R-3, blocking the Pacific coast of Colombia, forcing this country to create a seaplane base in Buenaventura, Valle del Cauca, and another in Cartagena de Indias. There she also faced mercenaries hired by the Colombian State.

Northern and northeastern military campaign of 1941

When the Ecuadorian–Peruvian War broke out in 1941, this cruiser, along with the destroyer Almirante Villar, was anchored in the port of Callao, heading on July 7 towards the port of Salaverry, joining the theater of operations on the 9th, and then, between July 10 and 13, escort, together with the destroyer Almirante Villar, the convoy made up of the Mantaro and Ireland transports of the Compañía Peruana de Vapores, and the oil tanker Pariñas (which had joined the Squadron), which since Callao was heading north, transporting troops and supplies for the Peruvian Army that was in the northern Theater of Operations.

With her base in Puerto Pizarro, she carried out patrols in front of the Jambelí channel and bombarded Punta Jambelí and Puerto Bolívar to prepare for the Peruvian advance on El Oro.

Due to the complete withdrawal of the Ecuadorian ships towards Guayaquil, and considering that there was no longer any threat to the seafront, the Squadron decided to progressively withdraw its units to Callao, with Colonel Bolognesi arriving at port on August 24.

== Decommissioning ==
After more than 50 years of service, she was decommissioned in 1958 along with her twin, Admiral Grau.
