= French cruiser Tourville (1926) =

French WW II-era heavy cruiser

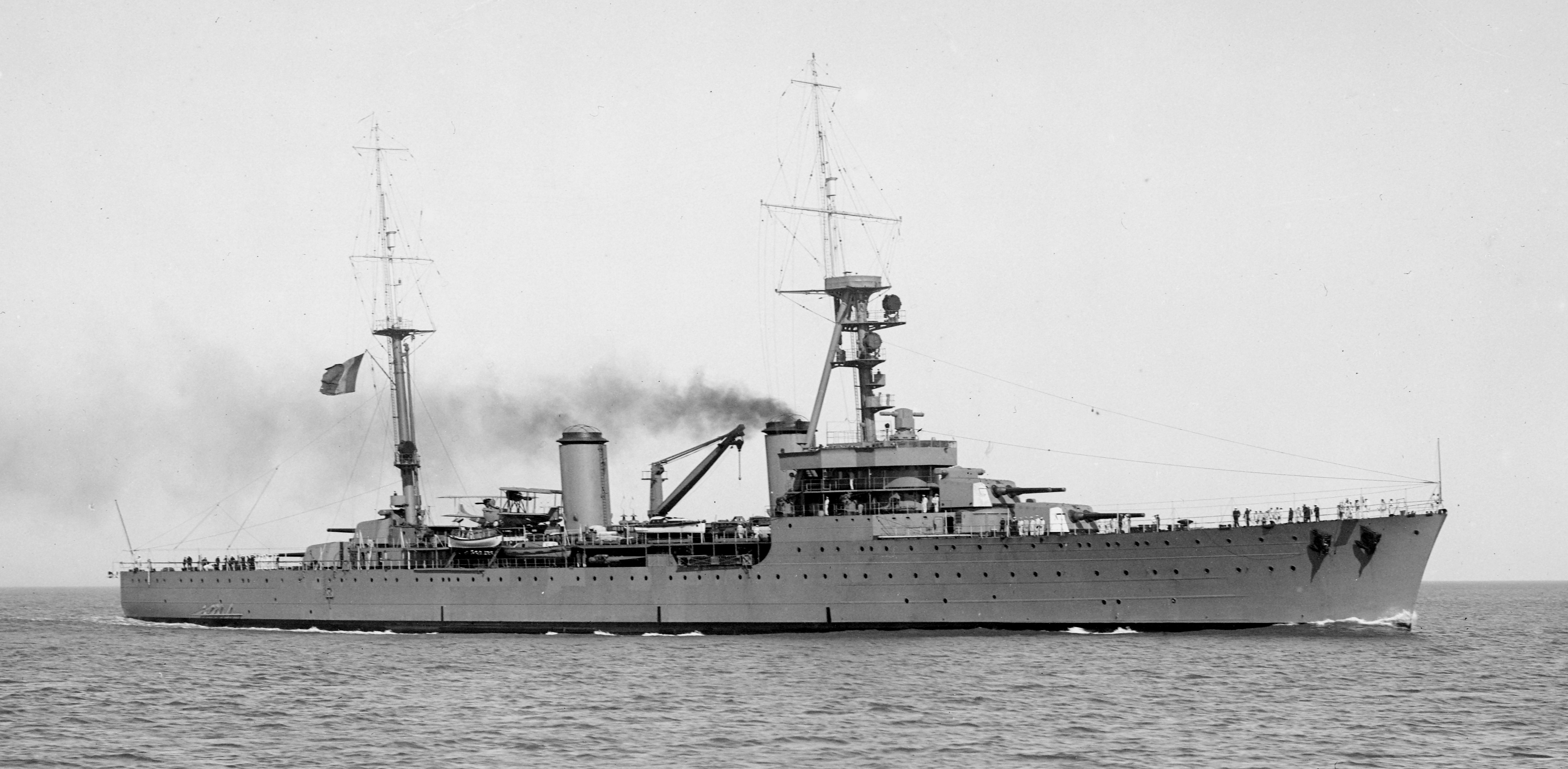
- Tourville in 1929

History

France
- Name: Tourville
- Namesake: Anne Hilarion de Tourville
- Ordered: 1 July 1924
- Builder: Arsenal de Lorient
- Laid down: 4 March 1925
- Launched: 24 August 1926
- Completed: 1 December 1928
- Commissioned: 5 May 1928
- In service: 12 Mar 1929
- Out of service: 8 March 1962
- Fate: Towed from Brest to Toulon for scrapping, 15 January 1963

General characteristics
- Class & type: Duquesne class
- Type: Treaty Cruiser; Marine National designation; 1924 Light Cruiser; 1931 1st Class Cruiser
- Displacement: 10,160 t (10,000 long tons) (standard); 11,404 t (11,224 long tons) (Normal); 12,435 t (12,239 long tons) (full load)
- Length: 191 m (627 ft) overall; 185 m (607 ft) between perpendiculars
- Beam: 19 m (62 ft)
- Draught: 6.32 m (20.7 ft)
- Propulsion: 8 Guyot du Temple boilers, 20 kg/cm2 (215°); 4-shaft Rateau-Bretagne single-reduction geared steam turbines for 118,358.4 shp (88,259.8 kW)
- Speed: 34 knots (63 km/h) (designed)
- Range: 1,842 tons oil fuel; radius 5,000 nautical miles (9,300 km) at 15 knots (28 km/h); 1,800 nautical miles (3,300 km) at 29 knots (54 km/h); 700 nautical miles (1,300 km) at 33 knots (61 km/h)
- Complement: 605
- Armament: Initial; 8 × 203 mm (8.0 in)/50 guns (4 × 2); 8 × 75 mm (3.0 in)/50 AA guns (8 × 1); 8 × 37 mm (1.5 in) light AA guns (4 × 2); 12 × 13.2 mm (0.52 in) AA machine guns (12 × 1); 12 × 550 mm (22 in) torpedo tubes (4 × 3); 1943 refit; 8 × 203 mm (8.0 in)/50 guns (4 × 2); 8 × 75 mm (3.0 in)/50 AA guns (8 × 1); 8 × 40 mm (1.6 in) AA guns (8 × 1); 16 × 20 mm (0.79 in) light AA guns (16 × 1)
- Armour: Magazine box 30 mm (1.2 in) sides and 20 mm (0.79 in) crowns; Deck 30 mm (1.2 in); Turrets and conning tower 30 mm (1.2 in)
- Aircraft carried: 2 FBA 17 and CAMS 37A (superseded by GL-810 then Loire-Nieuport 130
- Aviation facilities: 1 catapult

Tourville was the second ship of the Duquesne class cruisers of the French Navy. During the interwar period she served in the Mediterranean while taking periodic cruises to show the Flag. During the war she was on blockade duty in the mid Atlantic then the Mediterranean. She was interned for three years at Alexandria, rejoining the war effort in 1943. Again assigned to blockade duty in the Mid Atlantic at Dakar. Post war she aided in the restoration of French Colonial rule in French Indochina until placed in reserve in 1947. She remained in reserve until condemned for disposal in 1962.

She was named to honour Anne-Hilarion de Costentien, comte de Tourville (1642 – 1701) who served with distinction under King Louis XIV. He fought against the British and Dutch at the battles of Beachy Head (French: Beveziers) and Barfleur. On 27 June 1693 he defeated an English convoy commanded by George Rooke at Cape St. Vincent and was made Marshall of France.

== Design and description ==
Under the 1924 program two 10,000 ton Treaty Cruisers were authorized, becoming the Duquesne class. The contract for the second new vessel was awarded to the Arsenal de Lorient with the order being placed on 1 July 1924. The Tourville was built at Lorient, the only Treaty Cruiser not built at Brest, due to a lack of infrastructure available at Brest. She was laid down as hull no 45 on 4 March 1925 at the Arsenal de Lorient then launched on 24 August 1926. She started her sea trials on 27 September 1927 and her acceptance trials on 4 February 1928. She was commissioned on 5 May 1928 but not completed until 1 December.

Initially classed as a Light Cruiser she was reclassified on 1 July 1931 as a croiseur de 1ere classe (First class cruiser). The Marine Nationale did not have a vessel classification of heavy cruiser instead used croiseur cuirasse (armoured cruiser) and croiseurs legers (light cruiser) prior to the London Naval Treaty then croiseur de 1ere classe (First class cruiser) and croiseur de 2e classe (Second class cruiser) afterwards.

== Service history ==
=== Pre-war Service ===
She entered service on 12 March 1929 being assigned to the First Light Division at Brest. She departed on her shakedown cruise on 5 April by cruising around Africa returning to Lorient on 24 December. The First Light Division was transferred to Toulon in April 1930. In October 1934 Suffren, Duquesne and Tourville were assigned to the Third Light Division. During the Spanish Civil War she evacuated refugees and protected French interest from 1936 to 1937. In 1937 the Third Light became the Second Cruiser Division. At the beginning of January 1938 she commenced at refit at Toulon completing in August.

=== Wartime Service ===
At the outbreak of war in September 1939, Tourville was at Toulon with six other First Class Cruisers. Tourville together with Colbert formed the 2nd Division. The 2nd Division sailing from Bizerte, Algeria on 8 December cruised the Eastern Mediterranean to monitor shipping. Tourville returned on 26 December, she cruised from Bizerte, Algeria to Beirut, Lebanon during which she stopped and verified 32 merchant ships. From 20 January 1940 to 7 February she transported gold from France to Beirut to finance a loan from Turkey On 4 May 1940 she arrived at Alexandria to join Vice Admiral Godfroy's Force X. She sailed in concert with cruiser Suffern and Fleet Torpedo boat Forbin arriving in Beirut on 21 May joined by Duquesne and Duguay-Trouin six days later. Two more Fleet Torpedo boats Le Fortune and Basque arrived on 24 and 25 May respectively. On 11 June the ships conducted a raid into the Aegean off Crete, finding nothing returned to Alexandria on 13 May. On 22 June the official notification of the French Armistice with Germany was delivered. All French ships were barred from departing the harbour after 23 June. On 3 July Admiral Cunningham present Admiral Godfrey the ultimatum - surrender the ships to British control, demilitarize the ships at their moorings or scuttle. The Admirals signed an agreement on 7 July to demilitarize the vessels.

On 17 May 1943 the ships of Force X rejoined the Allied cause as part of the Free French Forces. On 18 August 1943 she sail with Duquesne via the Suez Canal, around the Cape of Good Hope to Dakar. She would be employed in anti-blockade duties searching for blockade runners, starting in October 1943. By 10 February 1944 she had made seven patrols. In December 1943 she was assigned to the 1st Cruiser Division of the Free French Fleet. Between January and March she underwent a modernization at Dakar as the Americans had deemed the older treaty cruisers as too old for a comprehensive modernization in the US. The 37 mm and 13.2 mm guns were removed and replaced with eight 40 mm Bofors AA guns in single mounts. Her mainmast was removed to clear her AA arcs of fire. The aircraft installation and torpedo tubes were landed. In June 1944 she sailed for Bizerte, Tunisia to be placed in reserve possibly undergoing a refit. In December she proceeded to Toulon where she was used as a base ship for escort vessels.

=== Postwar service ===
On 5 December 1945 she sailed for French Indochina with 610 passengers and 50 tons of equipment, arriving on 16 January 1946. She bombarded Cam Ranh and Cap Padaran between 23 January and 9 February. She participated in Operation Bentre and was at the Naval Review at Hal Long Bay (near Tonkin) on 23 March. She sailed to Saigon calling at Nha Trang before returning to Ha Long Bay. At the beginning of June she was in Shanghai and depart French Indochinese waters on 2 July, arriving in Toulon on 27 July 1946. At the end of September she sailed for Indochina, stopping in North Africa then on to Madagascar and La Reunion and finally Saigon on 30 November. She delivered 1,379 passengers and 277 tons of equipment. She carried out bombardments at Tourane (now Da Nang) in late December and January 1947 and a fire support mission off Annam in March. She followed this by transport missions between Saigon and Ha Lang Bay until September, though she was inactive during July and August at Saigon. She was finally relieved by the cruiser Duguay-Trouin and departed for France in November.

After arriving at Toulon on 11 December 1947 she then moved on to Brest arriving the on 13 December. On 1 January 1948 she was placed in reserve. She served as a floating barracks for the flotilla of the Second Maritime Region alongside the Battleship Paris, then Richelieu. She housed the School of Officers of the Reserve then became the Navigation School. On 28 April 1961 she was placed in Reserve B, then stricken on 8 March 1962. She was towed from Brest on 15 January 1963 arriving at La Seyne on 4 February for breaking.

== Bibliography ==
- Jordan, John & Moulin, Jean (2013). French Cruisers 1922–1956. Barnsley, UK: Seaforth Publishing. ISBN 978-1-84832-133-5.
- McMurtrie, Francis E. (1940). Jane's Fighting Ships 1940. London, UK: Sampson Low, Marston & Company, Ltd.
- Whitley, M.J. (1995). Cruisers of World War Two – An International Encyclopedia. London, UK: Arms and Armour Press. ISBN 1-85409-225-1.
