= French cruiser Duquesne (1925) =

1925 Duquesne-class cruiser

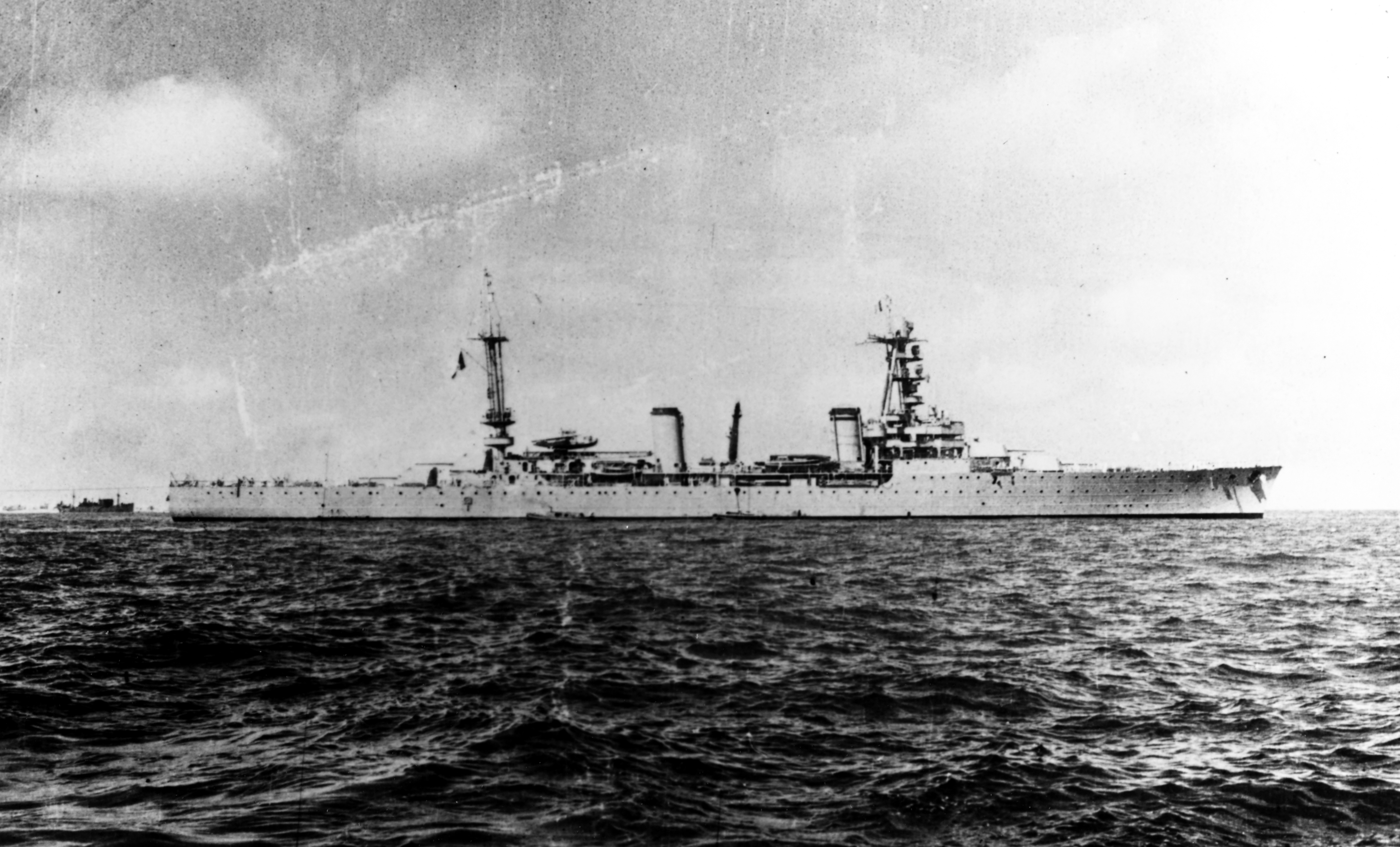
- Duquesne in 1943

History

France
- Name: Duquesne
- Namesake: Abraham Duquesne
- Ordered: 1 July 1924
- Builder: Arsenal de Brest
- Laid down: 30 October 1924
- Launched: 17 December 1925
- In service: 25 Jan 1929
- Out of service: 2 July 1955
- Fate: Listed for sale 27 July 1956

General characteristics
- Class & type: Duquesne-class cruiser
- Displacement: 10,160 t (10,000 long tons) (standard); 11,404 t (11,224 long tons) (Normal); 12,435 t (12,239 long tons) (full load)
- Length: 191 m (627 ft) overall 185 m (607 ft) between perpendiculars
- Beam: 19 m (62 ft)
- Draught: 6.32 m (20.7 ft)
- Installed power: 8 boilers; 118,358.4 shp (88,259.8 kW)
- Propulsion: 4-shaft geared steam turbines
- Speed: 34 knots (63 km/h) (designed)
- Range: 5,000 nautical miles (9,300 km) at 15 knots (28 km/h)
- Complement: 605
- Armament: Initial; 8 × 203 mm (8.0 in)/50 guns (4 × 2); 8 × 75 mm (3.0 in)/50 AA guns (8 × 1); 8 × 37 mm (1.5 in) light AA guns (4 × 2); 12 × 13.2 mm (0.52 in) AA machine guns (12 × 1); 12 × 550 mm (22 in) torpedo tubes (4 × 3); 1943 refit; 8 × 203 mm (8.0 in)/50 guns (4 × 2); 8 × 75 mm (3.0 in)/50 AA guns (8 × 1); 8 × 40 mm (1.6 in) AA guns (8 × 1); 20 × 20 mm (0.79 in) light AA guns (16 × 1)
- Armour: Magazine box 30 mm (1.2 in) sides and 20 mm (0.79 in) crowns; Deck 30 mm (1.2 in); Turrets and conning tower 30 mm (1.2 in)
- Aircraft carried: 2 2 FBA 17 and CAMS 37A (superseded by GL-810 then Loire-Nieuport 130
- Aviation facilities: 1 catapult

Duquesne was the first of two Duquesne class cruisers built for the French Navy. During the interwar period she served in the Mediterranean while taking periodic cruises to show the Flag. During the war she was on blockade duty in the mid Atlantic then the Mediterranean. She was interned for three years at Alexandria, rejoining the war effort in 1943. Again assigned to blockade duty in the Mid Atlantic at Dakar. Post war she aided in the restoration of French Colonial rule in French Indochina until placed in reserve in 1947. She remained in reserve until condemned for disposal in 1955.

She was named to honour Abraham Duquesne, Marquis du Bouchet (c. 1610 – 1688) who distinguished himself during the Third Dutch War. She was the seventh ship to bear this name since introduced in 1787 for a 74-gun ship captured by the British on 25 July 1803.

== Design and description ==
Under the 1924 program two 10,000 ton Treaty Cruisers were authorized, becoming the Duquesne class. The contract for one new vessel was awarded to the Arsenal de Brest with the order being placed on 1 July 1924. The hull featured a high freeboard with the raised forecastle that would be carried on for all post-war cruisers with excellent sea keeping qualities. The hull design had fine lines for the speed requirement complemented by the clipper bow with a gentle sheer and the marked flare keeping the forecastle dry even in heavy weather. She was laid down with her hull designated as number 44 on 30 October 1924 at Brest. She was launched on 17 December 1925. She continued to fit out until ready for her contractor trials on 1 August 1927. With acceptance from the contractors she underwent acceptance trials on 15 November. She was commissioned on 1 May 1928. On July 3, 1928 she partook in a Naval Review at Le Havre being one of four cruisers present. She was finally completed on 6 December 1928.

Initially classed as a Light Cruiser she was reclassified on 1 July 1931 as a croiseur de 1ere classe (First class cruiser). The Marine Nationale did not have a vessel classification of heavy cruiser instead used croiseur cuirasse (armoured cruiser) and croiseurs legers (light cruiser) prior to the London Naval Treaty then croiseur de 1ere classe (First class cruiser) and croiseur de 2e classe (Second class cruiser) afterwards.

== Service history ==
=== Pre-war service ===
She entered service on 25 January 1929 being assigned to the First Light Division at Toulon. Her first flag showing cruise was around Africa returning in October 1929. November 1929 she was assigned as Flagship to the 1st Light Division of the 1st Squadron at Toulon. On 10 May 1930 she partook in a Naval Review celebrating 100 years since the arrival of the French in Algeria at Algiers. On 31 October 1931 she visited the US to commemorate the 150th anniversary of the Battle of Yorktown. In October 1934 she was assigned to the 3rd Light Division. After 1938 she was assigned to the Gunnery School until the outbreak of war in September 1939.

=== Wartime service ===
On 25 January 1940 she sailed to Dakar as part of Force Y for employment on sweeps of the Atlantic searching for enemy merchantmen and merchant raiders. On 11 April Force Y departed Dakar. On 4 May 1940 as the Flagship of Vice Admiral Godfroy she arrived at Alexandria and took command of Force X. On 22 June she was preparing to sail with the cruisers Duguay-Trouin and Suffren for a bombardment mission on Augusta, Sicily and a raid off the Straits of Messina when official notification of the French Armistice with Germany was delivered. Their departure was cancelled and the French ships were barred from departing the harbour after 23 June. On 3 July Admiral Andrew Cunningham presented Admiral Godfrey the ultimatum - surrender the ships to British control, demilitarize the ships at their moorings or scuttle. The Admirals signed an agreement on 7 July to demilitarize the vessels.

On 17 May 1943 the ships of Force X rejoined the Allied cause as part of the Free French Forces. In July 1943 she sailed via the Suez Canal around the Cape of Good Hope to Dakar. In December 1943 she was assigned to the 1st Cruiser Division of the Free French Fleet. She would be employed in anti-blockade duties searching for blockade runners conducting nine patrols between late September and late February. She then underwent a refit at Dakar to modernize her antiair armament. On 1 May 1944 she arrived at Greenock on the River Clyde bringing ammunition for the French Second Class cruisers. Her AA armament was considered too weak to participate in the landing operation. On 25 August she sailed for Casablanca with a reduced crew to be used as a transport. By 14 December she was in Plymouth then assigned to Group Lorraine of the French Navy employed in bombarding isolated German fortresses along the Atlantic Coast. On April 1, 1945 she was deployed with the old battleship Lorraine and several small escort ships for the successful retaking of Royan and Pointe du Grave clearing the way to Bordeaux.

=== Postwar service ===
With the cessation of hostilities in May 1945 she underwent a five month refit at Brest commencing on 16 June finishing on 14 November 1945. On 22 December 1945 she sailed for French Indochina to aid in the re-assersion of French authority over the region arriving at Saigon on 26 January. On 28 February she sailed to assist in the retaking of Tonkin. On 24 March she was at the Naval Review in Ha Long Bay. During the period from the end of March to the middle of April she made round trips to Shanghai and Hong Kong as well as two trips between Saigon and Tonkin. In May she again sailed to Hong Kong and Shanghai. August and September she was sailing between Saigon and Tonkin. She departed Saigon on 4 October returning to France on 6 November. She remained in France only for about month before she redeployed back to French Indochina. For her final deployment she departed on the on 22 December arriving at Saigon on 17 January 1947. After a transport mission to Tonkin she provided fire support at Tourane (present day Da Nang). During March she fired 475 rounds of 75 mm shells. On 16 April she departed Saigon for France arriving in Home Waters on 16 May.

Duquesne was placed in reserve at Toulon on 1 September 1947 then attached to the Amphibious Operations Training Center at Arzew, Algeria, She proceeded to Oran for modification between February and August 1948 for her new role. On 30 August she was moored at Arzew and would remain until stricken on 2 July 1955. Redesignated as Q 52 she was towed to Mers el-Kebir in August. She was put up for sale on 27 July 1956.

== Bibliography ==
- Couhat, Jean Labayle (1971). French Warships of World War II. Shepperton, UK: Ian Allan Ltd. SBN 7110-0153-7.
- Jordan, John & Moulin, Jean (2013). French Cruisers 1922–1956. Barnsley, UK: Seaforth Publishing. ISBN 978-1-84832-133-5.
- McMurtrie, Francis E. (1940). Jane's Fighting Ships 1940. London, UK: Sampson Low, Marston & Company, Ltd.
- Whitley, M.J. (1995). Cruisers of World War Two – An International Encyclopedia. London, UK: Arms and Armour Press. ISBN 1-85409-225-1.
