= Almirante Grau-class cruiser =

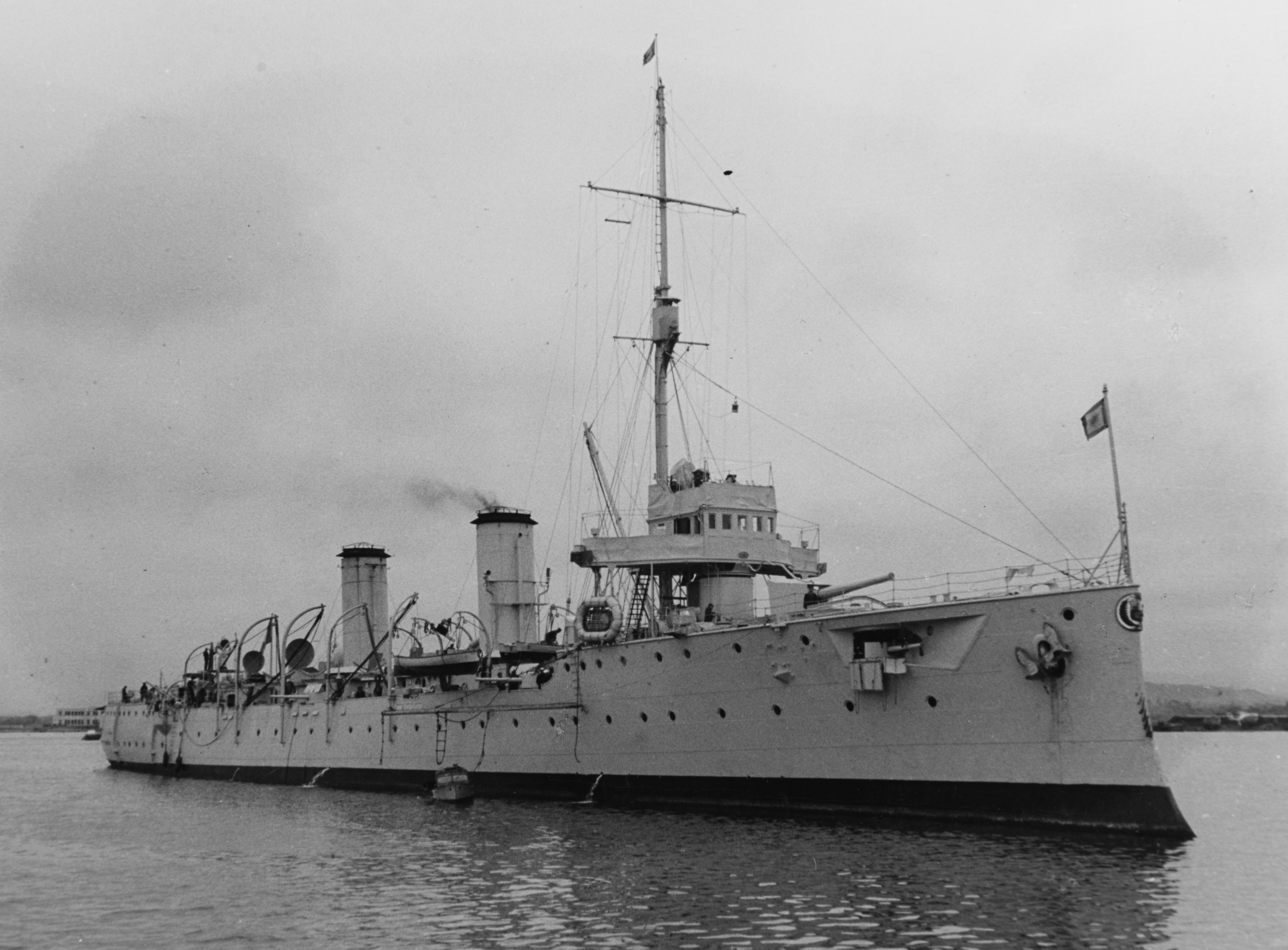
- Almirante Grau in 1942

Class overview
- Name: Almirante Grau class
- Builders: Vickers Sons & Maxim, Barrow
- Operators: Peruvian Navy
- Built: 1905–1907
- In commission: 1906–1958
- Completed: 2
- Scrapped: 2

General characteristics (As built)
- Type: Scout cruiser
- Displacement: 3,100 long tons (3,150 t) Normal
- Length: 115.82 m (380 ft) oa
- Beam: 12.34 m (40 ft 6 in)
- Draught: 4.267 m (14 ft)
- Installed power: 14,000 ihp (10,000 kW)
- Propulsion: 2 shafts, triple-expansion steam engines
- Speed: 24 kn (44 km/h; 28 mph)
- Range: 3,276 nmi (6,067 km; 3,770 mi) at 10 km (6.2 mi)
- Complement: 320
- Armament: 2 × 6 in (152 mm) guns; 8 × 14-pounder (76 mm) guns; 8 × 3-pounder (47 mm) guns; 2 × 18 in (450 mm) torpedo tubes
- Armour: Deck: 38 mm (1 1/2 in); Conning tower: 76 mm (3 in); Gun shields:76 mm (3 in)

The Almirante Grau class was a class of two scout cruisers built for the Peruvian Navy between 1905 and 1907. Both ships remained in service until 1958.

== Construction and design ==
In 1905, Peru placed orders with the British shipbuilder Vickers, Sons & Maxim for two scout cruisers, similar in design to Vickers' Sentinel class built for the British Royal Navy. Named Almirante Grau and Coronel Bolognesi, the ships were far more powerful than any other ship in the Peruvian Navy, which had suffered severe damage in the War of the Pacific twenty years earlier and had not ordered any new warships since.

The two scout cruisers were to be what one magazine called the "pioneers" of a growing and modernized Peruvian Navy; the navy intended for Almirante Grau to remain as the fleet's flagship only until more powerful warships were purchased. As of 1905, Peru's naval expansion plans included three Swiftsure-like battleships, three armored cruisers, six destroyers, and numerous smaller warships, all acquired in a nine-year, $7 million outlay. None of these purchases came to fruition, and Almirante Grau and Coronel Bolognesi remained the most powerful Peruvian warships for many years.

The ships were 115.82 metres (380 ft) long overall and 112.78 metres (370 ft) between perpendiculars, with a beam of 12.34 metres (40 ft 6 in) and a draught of 4.267 metres (14 ft). Displacement was 3,100 long tons (3,150 t) Normal. They were powered by two coal-fired four-cylinder triple-expansion steam engines, each driving a single propeller shaft. The engines were fed with steam at 1,700 kilopascals (250 psi) by ten Yarrow boilers. The machinery was rated at 14,000 indicated horsepower (10,000 kW) giving a contract speed of 24 knots (44 km/h; 28 mph). 500 t of coal were carried, sufficient to give a range of 3,276 nautical miles (6,067 km; 3,770 mi) at 10 knots (19 km/h; 12 mph).

The ships were armed with two 6-inch (152 mm) guns, one each fore and aft, with eight 14-pounder (76 mm) guns on single mounts on the ships' waists, backed up by eight 3 pounder (47 mm) Hotchkiss guns. Two submerged 18-inch (450 mm) torpedo tubes were fitted. The ships had a 38 millimetres (1 1/2 in) armoured deck, with 76 millimetres (3 in) of armour protecting the ships' conning tower and 76 millimetres (3 in) thick gunshields on the six-inch guns. The ships had a complement of 320 officers and ratings, with one of the ships, Almirante Grau, fitted as a flagship, with additional accommodation provided in a poopdeck, while a sternwalk was also fitted to Almirante Grau.

The ships were laid down at Vickers' Barrow-in-Furness shipyard in 1905 and launched in 1906. They both comfortably met the required speed of 24 knots (44 km/h; 28 mph) during sea trials, with Almirante Grau reaching 24.64 knots (45.63 km/h; 28.36 mph) during trials and Coronel Bolognese making 24.726 knots (45.793 km/h; 28.454 mph).

== Service ==
After completion, the two ships sailed together from England to Peru, reaching Callao on 10 August 1907. During the First World War, the two cruisers escorted merchant ships of the coast of Peru, with Almirante Grau also serving as a depot ship for submarines.

In 1925, the two ships were refitted, with the boilers being re-tubed and converted to use oil. In 1932, a war broke out between Peru and Colombia over territory in the Amazon rainforest. In May 1933, Almirante Grau, escorted by two submarines, was sent via the Panama Canal to the mouth of the Amazon River to support operations by Peruvian warships on the Amazon. However, the war ended before they arrived, so Almirante Grau and the two submarines returned to the Pacific.

The two cruisers were re-boilered by Yarrow in 1934, the 10 old boilers being replaced by 8 new ones, giving a speed of 23.5 knots (43.5 km/h; 27.0 mph). A new fire control system was later fitted, and in 1936, two of the 14-pounder guns were replaced by Japanese 76 mm anti-aircraft guns.

From July 1941 to January 1942, the two cruisers took part in a blockade of the Gulf of Guayaquil during the Ecuadorian–Peruvian War. During the 1940s, the ships' bridges were modified, and tripod masts replaced the original foremast. Anti-aircraft armament was strengthened by the addition of seven .50 in (12.7 mm) Browning machine guns, while a depth charge thrower and rails was fitted to provide an anti-submarine capability. Following the entry of Peru into World War II in 1944, the two cruisers were used for coastal patrols. After the war, they were used as training ships, and then as stationary hulks before being stricken on 24 June 1958 and sold for scrap.

== Ships ==
Ship	Laid Down	Launched	Completed	Fate
Almirante Grau	1905	27 March 1906	19 October 1906	Stricken 24 December 1958
Coronel Bolognesi	1905	24 September 1906	1 March 1907	Stricken 24 December 1958

== See also ==
- South American dreadnought race § Other navies
