= Etna-class cruiser (1941) =

Two never completed ships ordered for the Royal Thai Navy in 1938

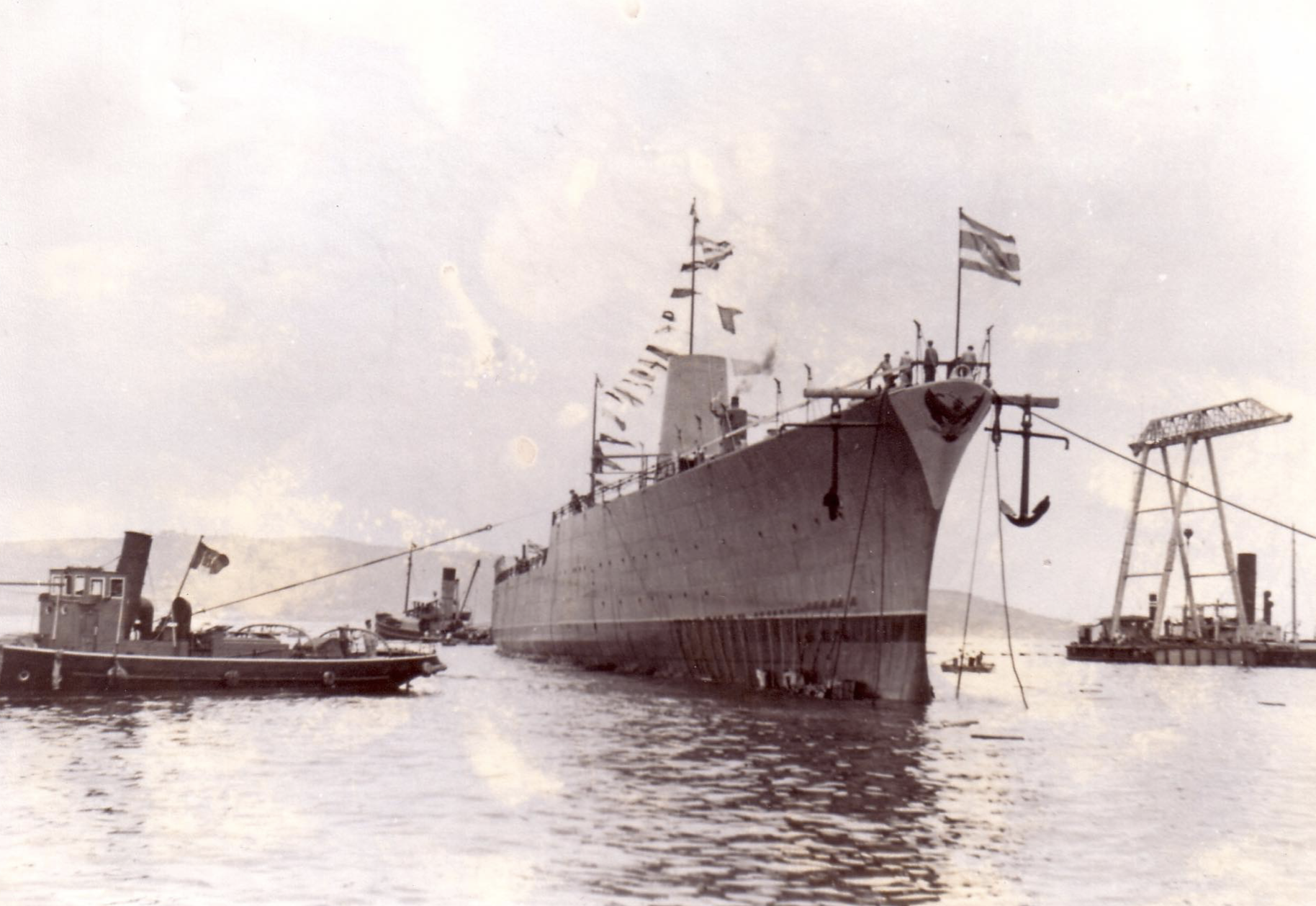
- An Etna-class cruiser

Class overview
- Name: Etna class
- Builders: C.R.D.A., Trieste
- Operators: Regia Marina; Royal Thai Navy
- Built: 1939–1942
- Planned: 2
- Completed: 0
- Lost: 2

General characteristics
- Type: Cruiser
- Displacement: 5,900 long tons (6,000 t) standard
- Length: 153.8 m (504 ft 7 in) overall
- Beam: 14.47 m (47 ft 6 in)
- Draught: 5.95 m (19 ft 6 in)
- Propulsion: 2 shaft geared turbines; 3 boilers; 40,000 hp (29,800 kW)
- Speed: 28 knots (52 km/h; 32 mph)
- Complement: 580
- Armament: (as redesigned for Italy); 3 × twin 135 mm (5.3 in)/45 OTO-Ansaldo 1938 guns; 10 × 65 mm (2.6 in)/64 Ansaldo-Terni 1939 AA guns; 10 × twin 20 mm (0.8 in)/65 Breda 1935 AA guns
- Armour: Belt 60 mm (2.4 in); Deck 20–35 mm (0.8–1.4 in)

The Etna class were two cruisers originally ordered in Italy for the Thai Navy in 1938 and subsequently requisitioned for service by the Italian Navy on the outbreak of World War II, neither ship was completed and the damaged hulls were scrapped after the war.

== Development ==
In the early 1920s, the Royal Thai Navy operated a small fleet of old vessels. To modernize the force, the Navy began to order new warships from the United Kingdom, Japan, and Italy. The effort peaked in 1934, with the order of 22 torpedo boats, minelayers, coast defense ships, sloops, and submarines from the latter two nations. In 1938, two cruisers were ordered from Italy, named Taksin and Naresuan. The initial Thai design featured an armament of three twin 15.2 cm (6.0 in) guns, six 7.6 cm (3.0 in) anti-aircraft guns, eight 1.32 cm (0.52 in) machine guns, and two triple 53.3 cm (21.0 in) torpedo tubes. The design was 153.8 m (505 ft) long, had a beam of 14.47 m (47.5 ft), and a draft of 5.25 m (17.2 ft). Propulsion consisted of 3 boilers that could theoretically produce 45,000 shp (34,000 kW) and a top speed of 30 knots (56 km/h; 35 mph) through two propellers. The class, named the Taksin-class cruiser, also featured an aircraft catapult amidship, a displacement of 5500 tons, 6 cm (2.4 in) of belt armor, and a 3 cm (1.2 in) thick armored deck.

== History ==
Taksin and Naresuan were laid down by Cantieri Riuniti dell'Adriatico in Trieste on 23 September and 26 August 1938, respectively. As the light cruisers were being built, Italy joined World War II. By late 1941, British land-based aircraft afflicted heavy losses on Italian merchants and escorts supplying North Africa as convoy duty became increasingly hazardous. In December 1941, the Italian government requisitioned the two ships, planning to rebuild them as anti-air cruisers that could carry cargo to Africa. Under Italian control, Taksin was renamed to Etna, and Naresuan became Vesuvio. The Italian design became known as the Etna-class, as the two ships were named after famous Italian volcanoes. The new design was not complete until 6 August 1942, when work could continue.

As both ships had already been launched, Italian designers were limited in what they could change. The torpedoes and catapult were removed, and the main guns were swapped with the 13.5 cm (5.3 in)/45 model 1938 in the same arrangement as before. Anti-aircraft armament consisted of ten single 6.5 cm (2.6 in)/64 and ten twin 2.0 cm (0.79 in) Breda guns. Five 6.5 mm guns were fitted on each side of the ship while the 2.0 cm guns were fitted on the former catapult deck, enlarged bridge, and funnel. In place of the catapult was a deckhouse intended to be used for troop accommodations; in conjunction with other spaces, the ships were planned to carry 1,000 soldiers. Four cargo holds near each gun could carry about 600 cubic metres (21,000 ft^{3}) of ammunition that were served by collapsible cranes.

== Ships ==
Ship	Laid down	Launched	Fate
Etna (ex-Taksin)	23 September 1939	28 May 1942	Scuttled September 1943
Vesuvio (ex-Naresuan)	26 August 1939	6 August 1941	Scuttled September 1943

When Italy surrendered to the Allies in September 1943 the hulls of the ships were 53% complete. Although both vessels were sabotaged before being captured by the Germans, they were able to continue some construction work before abandoning the project. The ships were scuttled in Trieste harbour in 1945. The hulls were re-floated and scrapped in the late 1950s.
