= Bistrița-class cruiser =

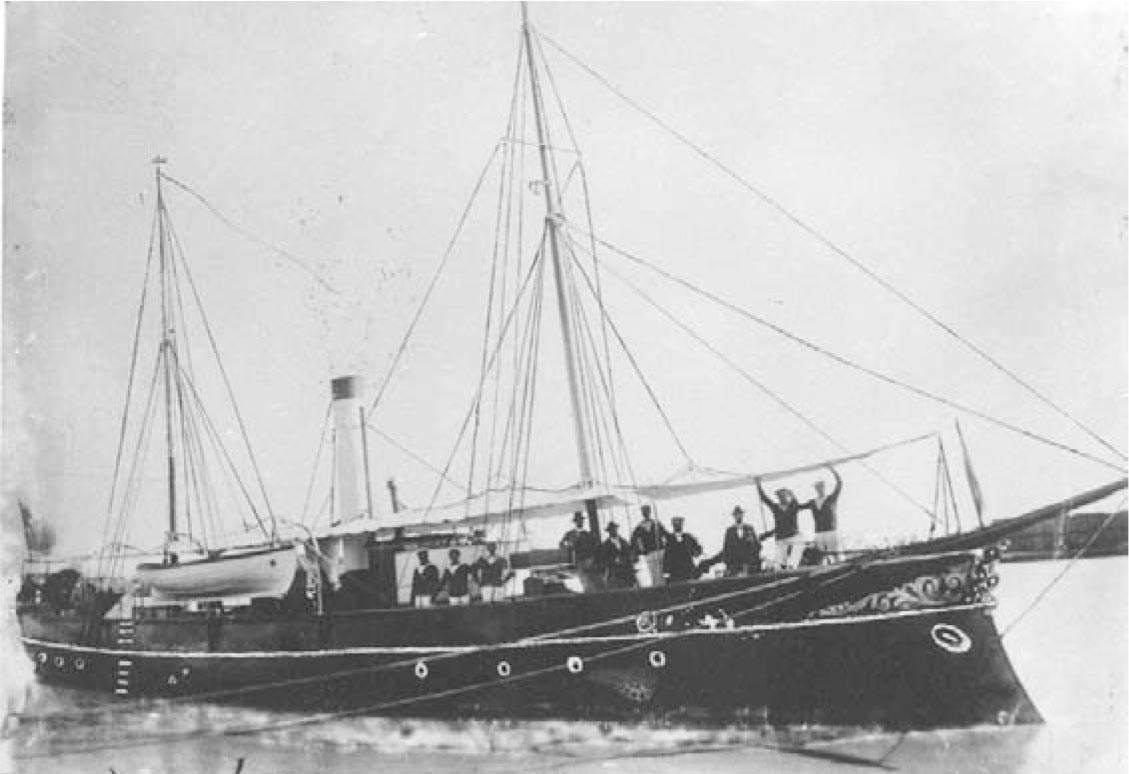
- Bistrița

Class overview
- Name: Bistrița-class cruiser
- Builders: Thames Iron Works, London
- Operators: Royal Romanian Navy
- Built: 1888
- In service: 1888–1949?
- Completed: 3
- Retired: 3

General characteristics
- Type: Coastguard cruiser
- Displacement: 100 tons (1947)
- Length: 30.48 meters
- Beam: 4.11 meters
- Draft: 1.75 meters
- Propulsion: 380 hp
- Speed: 12 knots
- Range: 12 tons of coal
- Complement: 30
- Armament: 1 x 57 mm Nordenfelt gun; 1 x 37 mm pom-pom gun

The Bistrița class was a group of three small coastguard cruisers of the Romanian Navy. They served from 1888 until at least 1949.

== Construction and specifications ==
The three cruisers were built by the Thames Iron Works in London during 1888. Named Bistrița, Oltul and Siretul, each displaced 96 tons standard. They measured 30.48 meters (100 feet) in length, with a beam of 4.11 meters (13 feet and 6 inches) and a draught of 1.75 meters (5 feet and 9 inches). Power plant produced an output of 380 hp resulting a top speed of 12 knots. Up to 12 tons of coal could be carried. Main armament consisted of one 57 mm (6-pounder gun) and secondary armament of one 37 mm (1-pounder) gun. Complement amounted to 30.

== Career ==
Along with the rest of the Romanian Navy, the class saw service during the Romanian Campaign of the First World War. The three vessels survived the Second World War and were still in service as of 1947, mentioned as 100-ton river gunboats (top speed and armament remained the same). They were last mentioned in 1949.

== Comparable cruisers ==
When commissioned, the three cruisers were comparable to the Italian torpedo cruisers of the Folgore class. Both classes were armed with 57 mm and 37 mm guns (although the Italian warships had two of the former and four of the latter) as well as both being classes of cruisers with a displacement under 400 tons.

Another somewhat comparable cruiser was Pietro Micca, another Italian torpedo cruiser. Displacing nearly 600 tons, this vessel was launched a whole decade before the Romanian vessels, armed only with two machine guns as artillery.
