= Peruvian cruiser Lima =

1880 cruiser for the Peruvian Navy

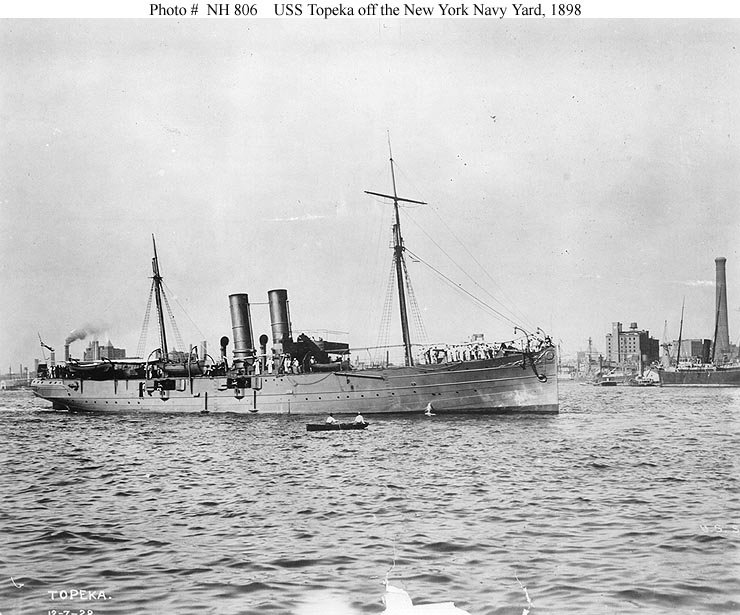
- Sister ship Diogenes as USS Topeka in 1898

History

Peru
- Name: Lima
- Launched: December 1880
- Completed: 1885
- In service: 1889
- Out of service: 1937

General characteristics
- Class & type: Lima-class cruiser
- Displacement: 1,700 long tons (1,700 t) (normal)
- Length: 77.7 m (254 ft 11 in)
- Beam: 10.67 m (35 ft)
- Draught: 4.7 m (15 ft 5 in)
- Installed power: 4 x coal-fired Scotch boilers, 1,800 ihp (1,300 kW)
- Propulsion: 2 x compound engines driving 2 shafts
- Speed: 16.2 kn (30.0 km/h; 18.6 mph)
- Complement: 150
- Armament: 2 × 6 in (152 mm) Armstrong guns; 3 × 47 mm (1.9 in) 3 pdr Nordenfelt guns

Lima was the lead ship of what was to be a two-ship class of unprotected cruisers for the Peruvian Navy, but ended up being the sole member of the class. Originally to be named Socrates and constructed as a merchant ship in Germany, the ship was purchased by Peru during the War of the Pacific and converted to a warship in England. The sale was complex, involving subterfuge to get around embargoes on the purchase of armed vessels by belligerent countries, and was only completed after the war's conclusion. On commissioning, the cruiser was the largest vessel in the Peruvian fleet. Initially armed with two 6 in (152 mm) guns, the ship's main armament was replaced in 1901 with 4 in (102 mm) guns. The ship was mobilised in 1910 in response to the threat of war with Ecuador. In 1920, the ship was refitted in Panama and subsequently operated as a transport and submarine depot. The vessel briefly saw service in the Colombia–Peru War in 1933 as a floating battery and was discarded in 1937.

== Design and development ==
On 14 February 1879, the Chilean ironclads Almirante Cochrane and Blanco Encalada entered Antofagasta and initiated the War of the Pacific, between Chile and a Bolivian–Peruvian alliance. As the war ensued, the Peruvian government attempted to source new warships from Europe and discovered two suitable merchant vessels under construction in Germany for a Portuguese client. It was claimed that the ships were ordered by the Greek government but under suspicion that the order may have come from Peru, which was a belligerent country, and that the ships were to be armed, the German government detained the ships. The Peruvian authorities then attempted to get the ships sold to the firm of Henry Lambert in London, under the subterfuge that the client was the French government. Once again, Peruvian influence was suspected and the ships were again retained. At the end of the war, the bankrupt Peruvian government could no longer afford two large vessels. One, the planned Diogenes, was sold to finance the other, which was completed as Lima. Diogenes was to have been named Callao in Peruvian service but eventually, in 1898, became the US Navy gunboat Topeka.

As completed. Lima was a unprotected cruiser built of iron with a straight bow. Displacing 1,700 tonnes (1,700 long tons; 1,900 short tons), the vessel had an overall length of 77.7 m (254 ft 11 in) and a beam of 10.67 m (35 ft) at the waterline. Draught was 4.2 m (13 ft 9 in) forward and 4.8 m (15 ft 9 in) aft. Mean draught was 4.7 m (15 ft 5 in) at deep load. Power was provided by compound marine steam engines with horizontally mounted cylinders that drove two propeller shafts. The engine was rated at 1,800 indicated horsepower (1,300 kW). Steam was provided by two double-ended and two single-ended Scotch boilers. They vented through two funnels and were powered by coal, with 335 tonnes (330 long tons; 369 short tons) of fuel carried. The engines gave a design speed of 16.2 knots (30.0 km/h; 18.6 mph). This was complemented by a two-masted schooner rig. As originally envisaged, the vessel would have been rigged as a brig.

Lima was completed as a cruiser with an armament of two single 6 in (152 mm) Armstrong rifled breech loading guns and three single 47 mm (1.9 in) Nordenfelt 3-pounder guns. The main armament was mounted in single mounts fore and aft behind shields. The vessel was later rearmed in 1901. The main armament was replaced by Vickers 4 in (102 mm) quick-firing guns and an additional five 3-pounder guns were mounted. Each main gun weighed 1.7 tonnes (1.7 long tons; 1.9 short tons) and could propel a 31 lb (14 kg) shell at a muzzle velocity of 2,950 ft/s (900 m/s). The cruiser had a complement of 150 sailors of all ranks.

== Construction and career ==
Lima was originally constructed by Howaldts of Kiel, Germany as a merchant ship and named Socrates. The vessel was launched in December 1880. Purchased by the Chilean government in 1881, the vessel was initially to be converted into a gunboat and renamed by the German firm but this proved impossible due to restrictions placed on Peru as a belligerent nation. In 1882, the Japanese government approached the Chilean government to potentially purchase the vessel, along with sister ship Diogenese, for 1,2287,160 Japanese yen but this was turned down. Instead, the vessel was transferred to Britain and conversion to a cruiser was completed by Thames Ironworks. The vessel was completed in 1885 once the War of the Pacific had finished but, due to financial constraints, did not enter service until 1889.

On commissioning, Lima became the navy's flagship and remained the largest ship in the navy for more than twenty years. The vessel was based in Callao and formed the core of the Peruvian fleet (Escuadra) under the Callao Maritime Department. Due to the threat of a war with Ecuador on 4 April 1910, the cruiser was briefly mobilised but there was no conflict and so the vessel saw no action. The vessel was fitted with wireless telegraphy by Guillermo Wiese de Osma in 1911. In November 1919, the vessel was taken to at Balboa in the Panama Canal Zone for repairs, including rebuilding the boilers and fitting a new wireless telegraph, the previous one having been previously removed. The work was completed on 8 March 1920 and the vessel sailed back to Callao. The warship was subsequently used as a transport and then as a submarine depot.

In May 1933, the warship, now acting as a gunboat, was briefly deployed during the Colombia–Peru War. Along with the similarly outdated destroyer Teniente Rodriguez, the gunboat sailed through the Panama Canal and up the Amazon River to Iquitos to act as a floating battery. This proved to be one of the last voyages of significance the vessel was to take. Lima was retired in 1937 and sold to be broken up in 1940.

== Bibliography ==
- Arnold, Anthony J. (2000). Iron Shipbuilding on the Thames, 1832–1915: An Economic and Business History. Aldershot: Ashgate. ISBN 978-0-75460-252-1. OCLC 44915065.
- Brassey, Thomas, ed. (1897). "Part II: British and Foreign Armoured and Unarmoured Ships". The Naval Annual 1897. Portsmouth: J. Griffin & Co.: 227–335. OCLC 1342523853.
- English, Adrian J. (1984). Armed Forces of Latin America: Their Histories, Development, Present Strength, and Military Potential. London: Jane's. ISBN 978-0-71060-321-0.
- Friedman, Norman (2011). Naval Weapons of World War One: Guns, Torpedoes, Mines and ASW Weapons of All Nations; An Illustrated Directory. Barnsley: Seaforth Publishing. ISBN 978-1-84832-100-7.
- Grant, Jonathan A. (2007). Rulers, Guns, and Money: The Global Arms Trade in the Age of Imperialism. Cambridge: Harvard University Press. doi:10.4159/9780674273016. ISBN 978-0-67427-304-7. OCLC 654680502.
- Lyon, Huge (1979). "Minor Navies: Morocco, Paraguay, Persia, Peru". In Chesneau, Roger & Kolesnik, Eugene M. (eds.). Conway's All the World's Fighting Ships 1860–1905. Greenwich, UK: Conway Maritime Press. pp. 418–419. ISBN 978-0-85177-133-5.
- Milanovich, Kathrin (2004). "Naniwa and Takachiho: Elswick-built Protected Cruisers of the Imperial Japanese Navy". In Preston, Antony (ed.). Warship 2004. London: Conway Maritime Press. pp. 29–56. ISBN 978-0-85177-948-5.
- Noel, John Vavasour (April 1910). "The Clash Between Peru and Ecuador". Peru To-day. II (2): 10–17.
- Noel, John Vavasour (March 1911). "Callao Correspondence". Peru To-day. III (1): 43.
- Particulars of the War Ships of the World (10 ed.). London: Lloyds Register of British and Foreign Shipping. 1892. OCLC 894220775.
- "Repairs to the Peruvian cruiser "Lima"". The Panama Canal Record. XIII (30): 1. 10 March 1920.
- Rodríguez Asti, John (2000). Buques de la Marina de Guerra del Perú desde 1884: Cruceros [Peruvian Navy ships since 1884: Cruisers] (in Spanish). Dirección de Intereses Marítimos, Fondo de Publicaciones. OCLC 47056522.
- Scheina, Robert L. (1987). Latin America: A Naval History, 1810–1987. Shrewsbury: Tri-Service Press. ISBN 978-0-87021-295-6. OCLC 311332538.
- Silverstone, Paul H. (2013). The New Navy 1883–1922. Florence: Taylor and Francis. ISBN 978-0-20394-459-2. OCLC 962362670.
- Sondhaus, Lawrence (2004). Navies in Modern World History. London: Reaktion Books. ISBN 978-1-86189-202-7.
- Stoker, Donald; McMaster, Michael T. (2017). Naval Advising and Assistance: History, Challenges and Analysis. Solihull: Helion & Company Limited. ISBN 978-1-80451-619-5. OCLC 1446794635.
