= Treaty of Lima =

Variety of similarly named treaties

Treaty of Lima refers to a number of treaties.

- Treaty of Lima (1848), more formally known as the Treaty of Confederation between the Republics of Peru, Bolivia, Chile, Ecuador and New Granada, was signed on February 8, 1848.
- Treaty of Lima (1865), was two treaties, the Treaty of Union and Defensive Alliance and the Treaty for the Preservation of Peace, both agreed to by representatives from Argentina, Bolivia, Chile, Colombia, Ecuador, El Salvador, Guatemala, Venezuela and Peru. They were signed but never ratified.
- Treaty of Lima (1878), a Latin American "Treaty for the Establishment of Uniform Rules in Private International Law", was ratified only by Peru and did not go into effect.
- Treaty of Lima (1883) was a treaty of peace signed between Chile and Spain on 12 June 1883.
- Treaty of Lima (1929), replaced portions of the 1883 Treaty of Ancón dealing with the boundary between Peru and Chile and the provinces of Tacna and Arica.

== See also ==
- Lima Declaration
