= USS Wichita (CA-45) =

American WWII-era heavy cruiser

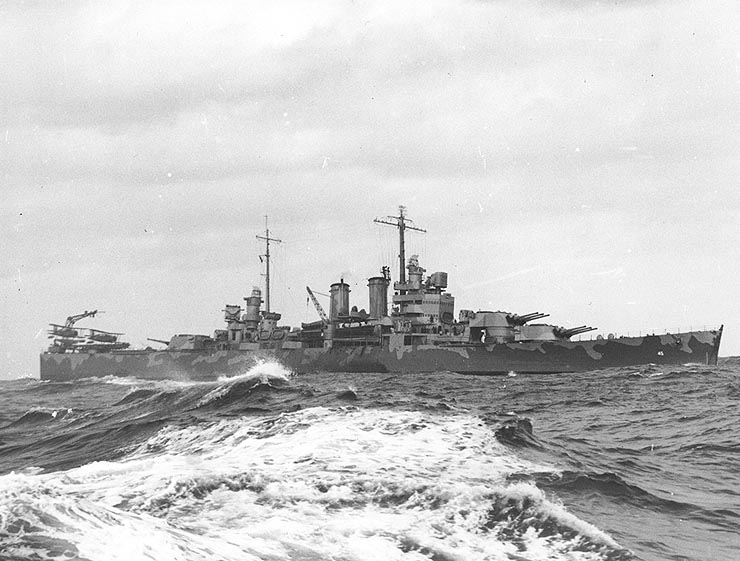
- USS Wichita (CA-45), 22 April 1942

Class overview
- Builders: Philadelphia Naval Shipyard
- Operators: United States Navy
- Preceded by: New Orleans class
- Succeeded by: Baltimore class
- Planned: 1
- Completed: 1
- Retired: 1

History

United States
- Name: Wichita
- Namesake: City of Wichita, Kansas
- Laid down: 28 October 1935
- Launched: 16 November 1937
- Commissioned: 16 February 1939
- Decommissioned: 3 February 1947
- Stricken: 1 March 1959
- Honors and awards: 13 × battle stars
- Fate: Sold for scrapping, 14 August 1959

General characteristics
- Type: Heavy cruiser
- Displacement: Standard: 10,589 long tons (10,759 t); Full load: 13,015 long tons (13,224 t)
- Length: 600 ft (180 m) wl; 608 ft 4 in (185.42 m) oa
- Beam: 61 ft 9 in (18.82 m)
- Draft: 23 ft 9 in (7.24 m)
- Installed power: 8 × Babcock & Wilcox boilers; 100,000 shp (75 MW)
- Propulsion: 4 × Parsons steam turbines; 4 × screws
- Speed: 33 kn (61 km/h; 38 mph)
- Range: 10,000 nmi (19,000 km; 12,000 mi) at 15 kn (28 km/h; 17 mph)
- Crew: 929 officers and enlisted
- Sensors & processing systems: 2x Mark 33 GFCS; 2x Mark 34 GFCS
- Armament: 9 × 8 in/55 Mk 12 guns; 8 × 5 in/38 Mk 12 guns; 8 × .50 caliber machine guns
- Armor: Belt armor: 6.4 in (160 mm); Deck: 2.25 in (57 mm); Turrets: 8 in (203 mm); Conning tower: 6 in (150 mm)
- Aircraft carried: 4 × scout planes
- Aviation facilities: 2 × catapults

USS Wichita was a unique heavy cruiser of the United States Navy built in the 1930s. The last American cruiser designed to meet the limits of the London Naval Treaty, she was originally intended to be a New Orleans-class heavy cruiser, accordingly with the maximum main armament of three triple 8-inch (203 mm) gun turrets. These were instead placed on an improved hull derived from the Brooklyn-class light cruisers, with increased armor. This design would go on to form the basis for the later World War II–era heavy cruisers such as the Baltimore class. The ship was authorized by the 1929 Cruiser Act, laid down at the Philadelphia Naval Shipyard in October 1935, launched in November 1937, and commissioned into the US Navy in February 1939.

Following her commissioning, Wichita was assigned to neutrality patrols in the Atlantic. After the United States entered World War II, the ship saw heavy service throughout the conflict. She was first assigned to convoy escort duty on the Murmansk Run in early 1942, and supported amphibious landings during Operation Torch in November 1942. During the Naval Battle of Casablanca, Wichita engaged several French coastal batteries and warships, including the battleship Jean Bart. In 1943, Wichita was transferred to the Pacific Theater, where she remained for the rest of the war. She frequently provided antiaircraft defense for the Fast Carrier Task Force during operations in the central Pacific, including the Battles of the Philippine Sea and Leyte Gulf in 1944. During the latter engagement, Wichita assisted in the sinking of the Japanese aircraft carrier Chiyoda.

Wichita was heavily engaged during the invasion of Okinawa, where she provided heavy gunfire support to ground troops ashore. After the Japanese surrender, the ship served as part of the occupation force in Japan and assisted in the repatriation of American military personnel under Operation Magic Carpet. After returning to the United States, she was decommissioned and placed in the "mothball" fleet in 1947. She remained in reserve until 1959, when she was stricken from the Naval Vessel Register and sold for scrapping in August 1959.

== Design ==
In the late 1920s, the Secretary of the Navy, Curtis D. Wilbur, pushed for a new construction program for light and heavy cruisers. Wilbur succeeded in passing the Cruiser Act in 1929, which authorized several new cruisers. Five heavy cruisers, the last of which was Wichita, were ordered between 1931 and 1934. Wichita was the last heavy cruiser permitted under the terms of the London Naval Treaty in 1930, which limited the US to 18 heavy cruisers with a maximum standard displacement of 10,000 long tons (10,160 t). The ship was originally intended to be built to the design of the New Orleans class, but the design was reworked before construction began. Instead, the design for Wichita was based on the Brooklyn class of light cruisers. The Brooklyn design was modified heavily, to give the new ship higher freeboard and better stability, and an increased cruising radius. The secondary battery of eight 5-inch (127 mm) guns was identical in number to the light cruisers, but was arranged to give better fields of fire. The main battery of nine 8-inch (203 mm) guns was mounted in a new gun turret design that rectified problems discovered in earlier cruisers.

Wichita was laid down at the Philadelphia Naval Shipyard on 28 October 1935, and launched on 16 November 1937. By the time she was completed, in February 1938, Wichita was nearly over the 10,000-ton limit; as a result, she was completed with only six of the eight 5-inch guns to keep her under the displacement restriction. When the rest of the 5-inch guns were installed, it was found that the ship was too top-heavy, and so 200.4 long tons (203.6 t) of pig iron had to be added to her bottom to balance the cruiser. Wichita was commissioned into the US Navy on 16 February 1939 and was assigned the hull number CA-45. Her first commander was Captain Thaddeus A. Thomson.

=== General characteristics ===
Wichita was 600 feet (182.9 m) long at the waterline and 608 ft 4 in (185.42 m) long overall. She had a beam of 61 ft 9 in (18.82 m) and a draft of 23 ft 9 in (7.24 m). She displaced 10,589 long tons (10,759 t) at standard displacement and 13,015 long tons (13,224 t) at full combat load. The ship had a crew of 929 officers and enlisted men. She was equipped with four seaplanes and a pair of aircraft catapults and a crane for handling the aircraft which were mounted on the stern. Wichita was powered by four Parsons steam turbines and eight Babcock & Wilcox oil-fired water-tube boilers. The propulsion system was rated at 100,000 shaft horsepower (75,000 kW) and a top speed of 33 knots (61 km/h; 38 mph). She carried 1,323 to 1,984 long tons (1,344 to 2,016 t) of fuel oil, which gave her a maximum cruising range of 10,000 nautical miles (18,520 km; 11,510 mi) at 15 kn (28 km/h; 17 mph).

The hull was protected by a waterline armored belt composed of Class A armor that was 6.4 in (160 mm) thick amidships. It was reduced to 4 in (100 mm) thick on either end. The belt was backed with .63 in (16 mm) of special treatment steel. The Class A steel was significantly more effective than the Class B armor used in earlier cruisers; 8-inch guns had to be within 10,000 yards (9,100 m) to penetrate the belt, as opposed to 16,400 yd (15,000 m) for the earlier armor. Wichita had a 2.25 in (57 mm) thick deck, which was immune to 8-inch fire inside 22,000 yd (20,120 m). The conning tower had 6 in (152 mm) thick sides and a 2.25 in thick roof. The ship's main battery turrets had 8 in (203 mm) thick faces, 3.75 in (95 mm) thick sides, 1.5 in (38 mm) thick rears, and 2.75 in (70 mm) thick roofs. The turrets were mounted on armored barbettes protected with 7 in (178 mm) of armor plating.

=== Armament ===
Wichita was armed with a main battery of nine 8-inch /55 Mark 12 guns mounted in three 3-gun turrets, controlled by a pair of Mark 34 directors. The guns fired a 335-pound (152 kg) projectiles at a muzzle velocity of 2,500 feet per second (760 m/s). Maximum elevation of the guns was 41 degrees; this provided a maximum range of 30,050 yd (27,480 m). Rate of fire was approximately one salvo every fifteen seconds. The turrets allowed each gun to elevate and fire individually.

Her secondary battery consisted of eight 5-inch /38 Mark 12 dual-purpose guns, four in single, enclosed Mark 30 high-angle mounts, and four in open mounts, controlled by a pair of Mark 33 directors. These guns fired 55 lb (25 kg) projectiles at a rate of 20 rounds per minute. Muzzle velocity was 2,600 ft/s (790 m/s); against aerial targets, the guns had a ceiling of 37,200 ft (11,300 m) at 85 degrees. At 45 degrees, the guns could engage surface targets at a range of 18,200 yd (16,600 m). Wichita was the first cruiser in the US Navy to be equipped with the new 5-inch /38 gun.

Initial light anti-aircraft weaponry consisted of eight .50 caliber machine guns. It was originally planned that the ship was to receive two quadruple 1.1 in (28 mm) anti-aircraft guns, though this was doubled to four when war broke out.

By August 1945, the ship had been equipped with numerous smaller guns for close-range anti-aircraft defense. Sixteen Bofors 40 mm guns were placed in quadruple mounts, and another eight were in dual mounts. She also carried eighteen Oerlikon 20 mm guns in single mountings. The 40 mm guns had a ceiling of 22,800 ft (6,900 m) at 90 degrees elevation and a maximum rate of fire of 160 rounds per minute. The 20 mm gun had a rate of fire of 465–480 rounds per minute; they had a ceiling of 10,000 ft (3,000 m). By the end of the war, the ship was armed with a variety of fire control systems for her guns, including Mark 34 fire control gear and Mark 13 and Mark 28 fire control radars.

== Service history ==
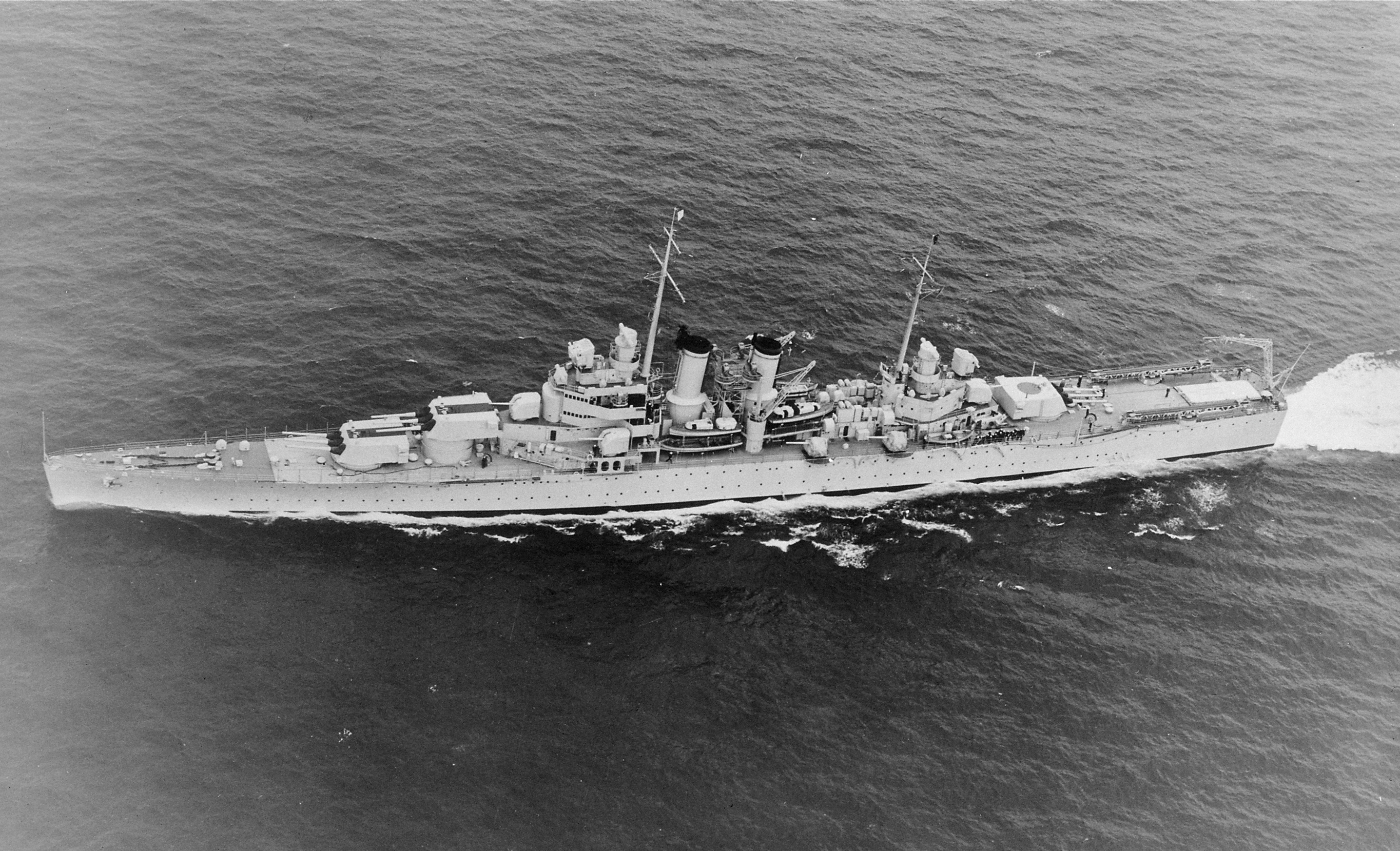
Wichita in pre-war light gray, on 1 May 1940

Wichita departed Philadelphia after her commissioning, bound for Houston, Texas. She arrived on 20 April 1939 and took part in the dedicatory and memorial service at the San Jacinto Battle Monument and War Relic Museum. The ship left Houston on 1 May for her shakedown cruise, during which she visited the Virgin Islands, Cuba, and the Bahamas before she returned to Philadelphia for post-shakedown repairs. On 25 September, a few weeks after the outbreak of World War II in Europe, Wichita was assigned to Cruiser Division 7 in the Atlantic Squadron, based in the Hampton Roads. She conducted her first neutrality patrol on 4–9 October. After returning to port, she went into dock at the Norfolk Navy Yard for maintenance, which lasted until 1 December. On 4 December, Wichita steamed to Guantanamo Bay, Cuba, arriving on the 8th. There, Thomson assumed command of the newly formed Caribbean Patrol, which included Wichita and the cruiser Vincennes, and the destroyers Borie, Broome, Lawrence, King, and Truxtun, and Navy patrol squadrons VP-33 and VP-51. Over the course of the next three months, the force conducted a series of training maneuvers in the Caribbean. At the end of February, Wichita returned to Norfolk via Philadelphia, where she participated in further training through May.

Starting in June, Wichita and Quincy conducted a goodwill cruise to South America; Wichita carried Rear Admiral Andrew C. Pickens, the commander of Cruiser Division 7. Included in the ports of call were Rio de Janeiro and Santos in Brazil, Buenos Aires, Argentina, and Montevideo, Uruguay. The cruise ended in late September; the two cruisers arrived in Norfolk on the 24th. Over the next three months, Wichita served as a training ship for Naval Reserve midshipmen and conducted gunnery practices off the Virginia capes. On 7 January 1941, Wichita departed Hampton Roads for Guantanamo, arriving four days later. She participated in fleet maneuvers in the Caribbean through March and took part in practice amphibious landings at Puerto Rico. She returned to the United States, docking at the New York Navy Yard, on 23 March. Wichita went to sea again on 6 April, bound for Bermuda; she reached her destination two days later. She then joined the aircraft carrier Ranger and the heavy cruiser Tuscaloosa for a patrol in the North Atlantic, during which the ships sailed to within 800 nautical miles (1,500 km; 920 mi) of Ireland.

Wichita then returned to the New York Navy Yard on 17 May and went into drydock on 21 June. Repairs were completed on 2 July, after which Wichita was transferred to Newport, Rhode Island. She sortied again on 27 July bound for Iceland as part of Task Force 16 under Operation Indigo II, the occupation of Iceland. Wichita arrived in Reykjavík on 6 August, along with the carrier Wasp and the battleship Mississippi. The task force landed a contingent of US Army troops and fighter aircraft to provide air support. The cruiser returned to the United States by 20 August. Wichita returned to Iceland in September, arriving in Reykjavík on 28 September. Two days prior to Wichita's arrival, the US Navy ordered the units of the Atlantic Fleet to protect all ships engaged in commerce in United States defensive waters. The orders authorized the Navy to patrol, escort merchantmen, and attack any German or Italian naval forces encountered. Wichita was assigned to Task Group 7.5, which was engaged in patrolling Icelandic waters through the end 1941. On 7 December 1941, the Japanese attacked Pearl Harbor, bringing the United States into World War II; on the day of the attack, Wichita lay at anchor at Hvalfjörður, Iceland.

=== Atlantic theater ===
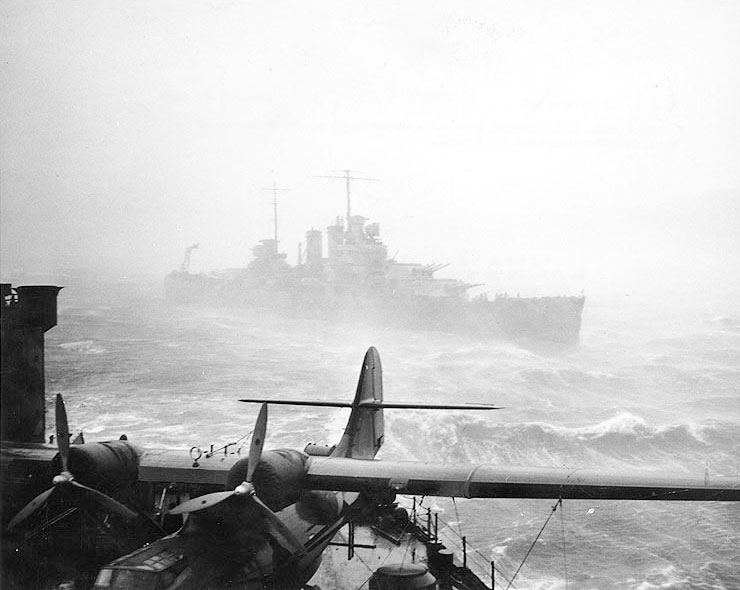
Wichita weathering a storm off Iceland

Wichita left port on 5 January 1942 for training and a patrol in the Denmark Strait; she returned to Hvalfjörður on 10 January. On the 15th, a powerful storm, with sustained winds of 80 knots (150 km/h; 92 mph) and gusts up to 100 kn (190 km/h; 120 mph), hit Iceland. Wichita was damaged by the storm, including a collision with the freighter West Nohno and the British trawler Ebor Wyke. She then ran aground off Hrafneyri Light. The following day, the ship's crew evaluated her condition; she had suffered minor damage from the collisions, including some leaks, and damage to the hull from the grounding. Temporary repairs were effected in Iceland to allow Wichita to return to the New York Navy Yard for more thorough repairs. She arrived on 9 February, and repairs lasted until 26 February, when she left port for training maneuvers off Maine in early March.

On 26 March, Wichita, assigned to Task Force 39, departed the United States to reinforce the British Home Fleet based in Scapa Flow. Task Force 39, commanded by Rear Admiral John W. Wilcox, Jr., included Wasp, the battleship Washington, the cruiser Tuscaloosa, and eight destroyers. While en route, Wilcox was swept overboard in a heavy sea and lost. Rear Admiral Robert C. Giffen, who flew his flag in Wichita, took command of the task force. After arriving in Scapa Flow, Wichita and the other American ships spent several weeks training with their British counterparts. On 28 April, Wichita departed on her first major operation with the British. She was assigned to the Allied escort for the Arctic convoys QP 11 and PQ 15. The American component, organized as Task Force 99, comprised Washington, Wichita, Tuscaloosa, and four destroyers. The British assigned the carrier Victorious, the battleship King George V, a light cruiser, and five destroyers. After successfully escorting the convoys, Wichita returned to Hvalfjörður, arriving on 6 May.

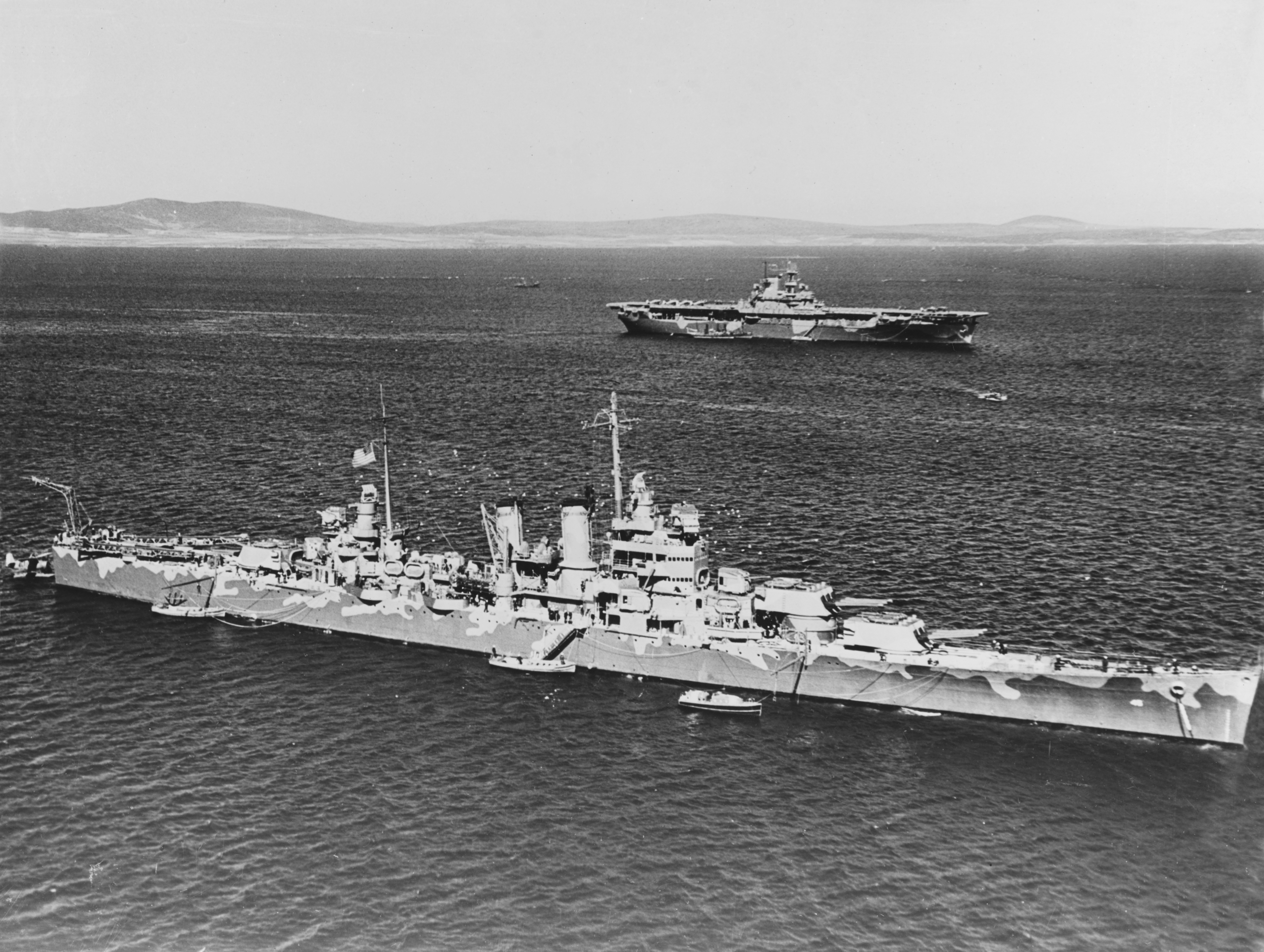
USS Wichita and USS Wasp in Scapa Flow in 1942

Wichita sortied on 12 May to relieve Tuscaloosa, which was patrolling the Denmark Strait. Wichita returned to Hvalfjörður a week later, before putting to sea as part of another Allied convoy escort protecting one leg of the movement of Murmansk-bound convoy PQ 16 and eastbound QP 12. She put into Scapa Flow on 29 May after completing the mission. While in Scapa Flow, King George VI inspected Wichita on 7 June. Wichita left Scapa Flow on 12 June, bound for Hvalfjörður, and arrived 14 June. She then relieved the British cruiser Cumberland on patrol in the Denmark Strait. While on patrol on 17 June, Wichita spotted a German Focke-Wulf Fw 200 reconnaissance bomber and opened fire, though without result. Three days later, she engaged another Fw 200, again without success.

After returning to Hvalfjörður, Wichita steamed to Seyðisfjörður at the end of June, where she joined Tuscaloosa and three destroyers. They were assigned to the escort for the convoy PQ 17. The convoy escort also included Washington, Victorious, and the battleship Duke of York. The Germans organized a powerful task force, centered on the battleship Tirpitz and three heavy cruisers, to attack the convoy; the operation was codenamed Rösselsprung (Knight's Move). Swedish intelligence had meanwhile reported the German departures to the British Admiralty, which ordered the convoy to disperse. Aware that they had been detected, the Germans aborted the operation and turned over the attack to U-boats and the Luftwaffe. The scattered vessels could no longer be protected by the convoy escorts, and the Germans sank 21 of the 34 isolated transports. The next day, while south of Spitzbergen, the ships were spotted and shadowed by a pair of Fw 200s. Both Wichita and Tuscaloosa opened fire with their antiaircraft guns, but the Fw 200s escaped without damage.

In late July, Wichita went into drydock at the Royal Navy base in Rosyth, Scotland. Repairs, which included correcting a propeller shaft vibration, lasted from 24 July until 9 August. The repairs to the propeller shaft were ineffective, however, which necessitated a return to the United States. She reached the New York Navy Yard on 22 August for repairs, which lasted until 5 September. She completed a round of post-repair sea trials before conducting gunnery exercises in the Chesapeake Bay. Wichita conducted training off the Virginia Capes for the rest of the month, after which she steamed to Casco Bay in Maine for further maneuvers.

==== Operation Torch ====
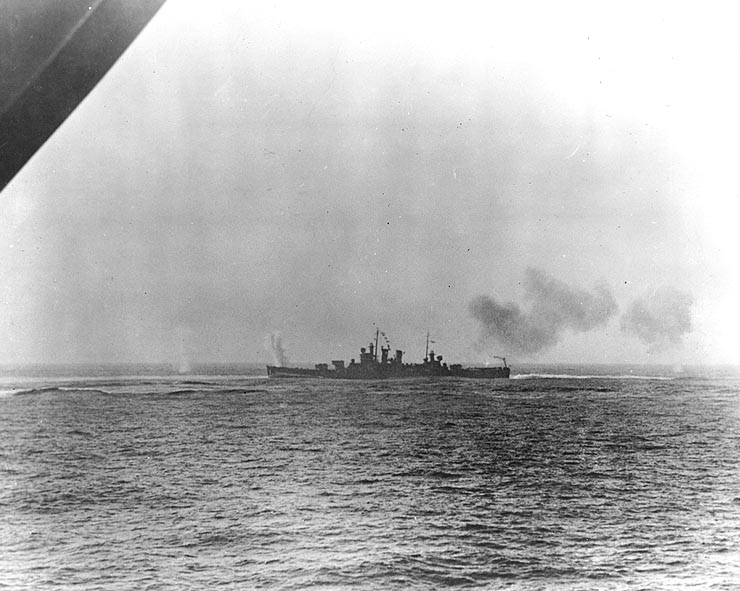
Wichita in a gunnery duel with Jean Bart

At the end of October, Wichita was assigned to Task Group 34.1, under the command of Rear Admiral H. Kent Hewitt, who flew his flag in Augusta. The Task Group also included the battleship Massachusetts and Tuscaloosa. The ships were assigned to provide gunfire support for Operation Torch, the invasion of French North Africa. Wichita participated in the Naval Battle of Casablanca, which began early on the morning of 8 November. The ships were tasked with neutralizing the primary French defenses, which included coastal guns on El Hank, several submarines, and the incomplete battleship Jean Bart which lay at anchor in the harbor. Wichita and Tuscaloosa initially engaged the French batteries on El Hank and the French submarine pens, while Massachusetts attacked Jean Bart. French naval forces, led by the cruiser Primauguet, put up a stubborn defense.

In response, the French launched a pair of attacks to break up the American landings. During the first French attack, either Wichita or Tuscaloosa damaged the French destroyer Milan and forced it aground. A second French attack was also defeated; one of the two cruisers sank the destroyer Fougueux and damaged Frondeur. Wichita, Tuscaloosa, and Massachusetts also engaged Jean Bart. At 11:28, Wichita was hit by a 194 mm (7.6 in) shell, fired by a gun on El Hank. The shell penetrated her deck and exploded below, injuring fourteen men. Hewitt broke off the attack temporarily, but by 13:12, several American warships began firing on French vessels exiting the harbor. Wichita and Tuscaloosa closed on the port to engage the cruisers Primauguet and Gloire, still in the harbor. Heavy fire from El Hank forced the American cruisers to retreat shortly after 15:00. For the remainder of the operations off North Africa, Wichita patrolled between Casablanca and Fedhala. Her part in the amphibious assault complete, Wichita departed the area on 12 November, bound for New York for repairs; she arrived on 19 November.

=== Pacific theater ===
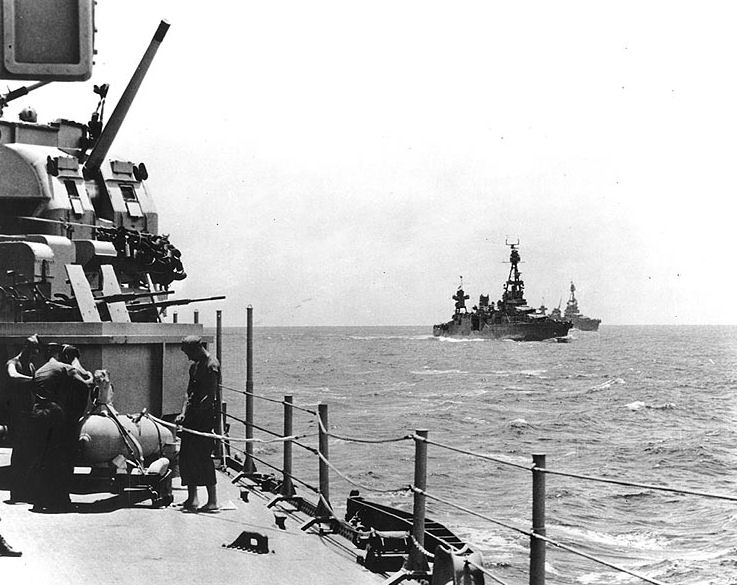
Louisville and Chicago, photographed from Wichita, off Rennell Island

Shortly after repairs were completed, Wichita was transferred to the Pacific theater. She was assigned to Task Force 18, commanded by Rear Admiral Giffen, and tasked with operations off Guadalcanal. She was joined by the heavy cruisers Louisville and Chicago, the light cruisers Montpelier, Cleveland, and Columbia. In addition, the escort carriers Chenango and Suwannee, and eight destroyers were present in the task group. On the night of 29 January 1943, the Task Force was steaming off Rennell Island; wary of the threat from Japanese submarines, which Allied intelligence indicated were likely in the area, Giffen arranged his cruisers and destroyers for anti-submarine defense, not expecting an air attack. The cruisers were aligned in two columns, spaced 2,500 yd (2,300 m) apart. Wichita, Chicago, and Louisville, in that order, were to starboard, and Montpelier, Cleveland, and Columbia were to port. The six destroyers were in a semicircle 2 mi (1.7 nmi; 3.2 km) ahead of the cruiser columns. That evening, the ships came under attack from Japanese torpedo bombers. In the ensuing Battle of Rennell Island, Chicago was hit by several torpedoes and sunk; Wichita was hit by one torpedo, though it failed to explode.

Wichita then steamed to Efate in the New Hebrides for a training period. She then departed on 7 April, bound for Pearl Harbor and arriving there a week later. On 18 April, she steamed out of Pearl Harbor for Adak, Alaska, again flying Giffen's flag, for Task Group 52.10. In early May, Wichita was assigned to the amphibious force tasked with liberating the Aleutian Islands from Japanese control. She served as the flagship of the northern covering force, along with the cruisers Louisville and San Francisco and four destroyers. On 6 July, Wichita, three other cruisers, and four destroyers bombarded Japanese positions on the island of Kiska. The bombardment convinced the Japanese that the Americans intended to invade the island in the near future; they therefore planned an evacuation by July.

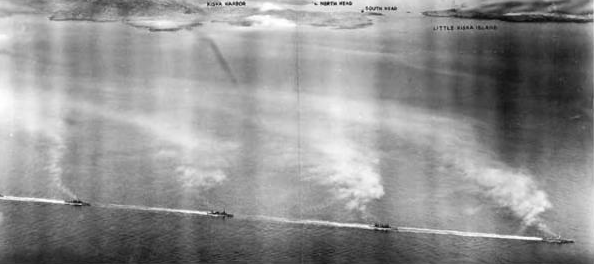
Wichita leading a column of cruisers bombarding Kiska on 22 July

On 19 July, a powerful American fleet, including the battleships New Mexico, Idaho, and Mississippi joined Wichita to conduct another attack on Kiska three days later. Five days later, malfunctioning radar equipment led to a battle with radar phantoms (the "Battle of the Pips"); Wichita, two battleships, and two other cruisers expended over a thousand rounds of ammunition from their main batteries on the empty sea. That same day, the Japanese successfully evacuated the island, which was invaded by American troops two weeks later. The morning after the assumed engagement, Wichita launched a seaplane to reconnoiter the area, but found no evidence of Japanese forces.

Wichita participated in exercises off Hawaii for the remainder of the year. On 16 January 1944, she departed to take part in the invasion of the Marshall Islands. She was assigned to Task Group 58.3, under the command of Rear Admiral Frederick C. Sherman. The Task Group included the fleet carrier Bunker Hill, the light carriers Cowpens and Monterey, the fast battleships North Carolina, Massachusetts, Alabama, and South Dakota, and several destroyers. Wichita provided anti-aircraft support for the carriers while they conducted air strikes on Kwajalein and Eniwetok on 29–31 January. On 4 February, Wichita arrived at Majuro; she was transferred to Task Group 58.2. The force departed Majuro on 12 February and conducted Operation Hailstone, a major air strike on the Japanese base at Truk, four days later.

On the night of 16 February, Japanese aircraft launched an attack on the Task Group and torpedoed the carrier Intrepid. Task Unit 58.2.4, which included Wichita, was detached to escort Intrepid back to safety and repairs. The ships reached Majuro on 20 February, and departed for Hawaii eight days later. The ships arrived in port on 4 March, and on the 9th, Wichita became the flagship of Cruiser Division 6. On 15 March, Cruiser Division 6 departed Hawaii to return to Majuro, arriving on 20 March. After arriving, she joined the screen for the Fast Carrier Task Force, which struck Japanese bases on Yap, Woleai, and in the Palaus. Wichita supported strikes on Hollandia in New Guinea on 13–22 April. The task force returned to the seas off Truk on 29 April for a second round of airstrikes on the port. While the carriers were striking Truk, Wichita and several cruisers and destroyers shelled Japanese targets on Satawan Island in the Nomol group of the Caroline Islands.

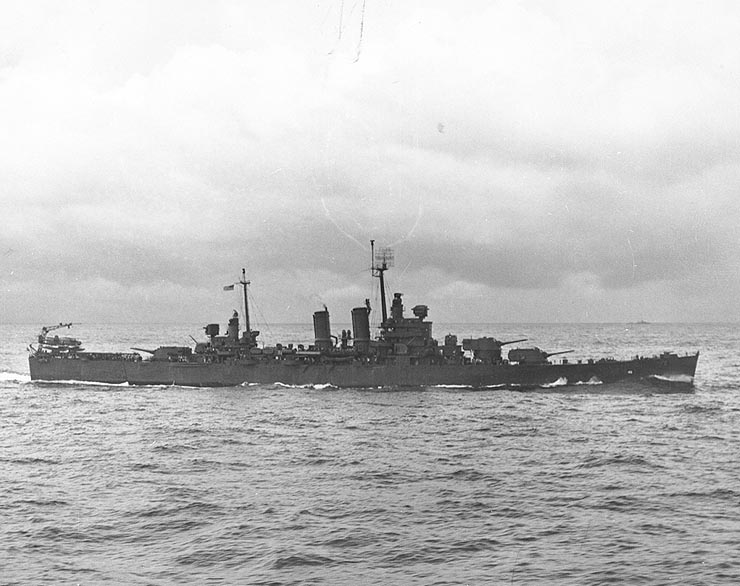
Wichita underway in the Pacific, in May 1944

On 4 May, Wichita returned to Majuro for a month of training. In June, she returned to the fleet, which was gathering at Kwajalein in preparations for operations against the Mariana Islands. Wichita was assigned to Task Unit 53.10.8, which shelled Saipan on 13 June. The next day, Wichita bombarded Japanese gun positions on Guam, before returning to Saipan later that day. On 17 June, she joined Task Group 58.7; the force patrolled to the west of the Marianas over the next three days in an attempt to intercept the large Japanese carrier force known to be approaching. On 19 June, the Japanese carriers struck at the American fleet, starting the Battle of the Philippine Sea. Wichita contributed to the antiaircraft screen; her gunners claimed to have assisted in the destruction of two Nakajima B5N torpedo bombers. The ship was detached to cover troop transports and escort carriers off Saipan on 25 June. This duty lasted through the first week of July. Now part of Task Unit 53.18.1, Wichita bombarded Japanese positions on Guam on 8–12 July, and again starting on 18 July.

Wichita departed Guam on 10 August, bound for Eniwetok. She arrived three days later and remained there until 29 August, when she put to sea to join Task Group 38.1. She screened for the fast carrier task group while they launched airstrikes on Japanese targets in Palau, the Carolines, the Philippines, and Dutch East Indies. On 28 August, TG 38.1 raided targets in Palau and Morotai. By mid-September, TG 38.1 provided air support for the assault on Morotai; the operation lasted until 21 September. The following day, the carriers launched an airstrike on Manila in the Philippines. Early on 22 September, Japanese aircraft launched a counterattack. At 07:34, Wichita shot down a bomber approximately 50 yards from her. She shot down another bomber at 07:45. She continued to provide antiaircraft defense for the carriers while they struck Japanese installations on Cebu, Negros, and Coron.

==== Operations off the Philippines ====
Wichita got underway to support a raid on Okinawa on 2 October. On 10 October, the fleet reached the waters off Okinawa and launched the strike. The following day, the fleet struck Aparri on Luzon. The fleet then raided Formosa, where they targeted Japanese airfields to prepare for the upcoming assault against the Philippines. On 13 October, Japanese bombers attacked the fleet and badly damaged the cruiser Canberra. Wichita took Canberra under tow, though she was relieved by the ocean-going tug Munsee on 15 October. Wichita joined the screen for Canberra; the squadron was joined by the badly damaged cruiser Houston. The ships were attacked again the following day, and Houston was torpedoed again. Wichita left the damaged ships on 21 October, after they had successfully reached safer waters. Wichita then rejoined the fleet off Luzon, assigned to Task Force 34 under Vice Admiral Willis A. Lee.

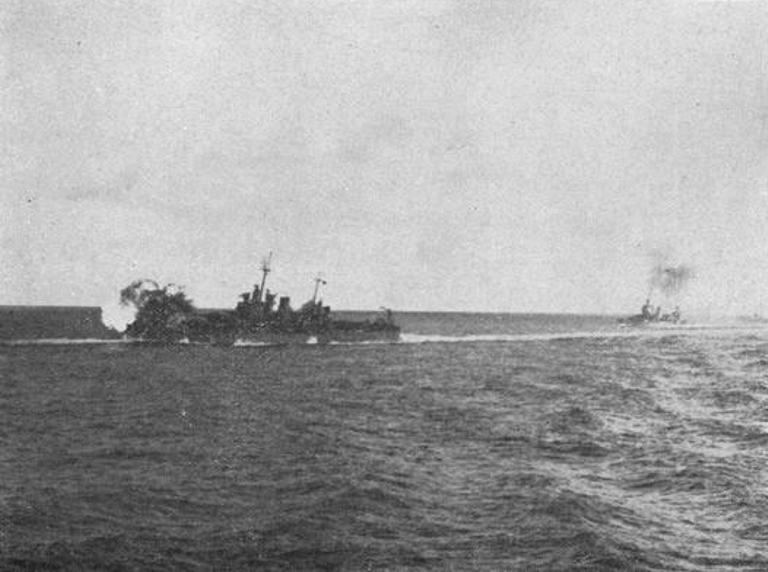
Wichita firing on Japanese ships at Cape Engaño, 25 October 1944

Wichita was present during the Battle of Leyte Gulf, which started on 23 October. On 25 October, the Fast Carrier Strike Force had steamed north, to attack the Northern Force commanded by Jisaburō Ozawa. Wichita again screened for the carriers, which sank or damaged several Japanese carriers. Task Force 34 was detached to finish off several of the crippled Japanese ships with gunfire; Wichita and three other cruisers sank the light carrier Chiyoda and the destroyer Hatsuzuki. Wichita expended twenty-two percent of her armor-piercing rounds at the two ships, which amounted to 148 rounds at Chiyoda and 173 against Hatsuzuki. In the aftermath of the battle, Wichita returned to screening for the carriers off Samar. On 28 October, she provided gunfire support to troops ashore on Leyte. Two days later, she defended against a Japanese airstrike on the fleet.

On 31 October, Wichita left the area, bound for Ulithi, reaching her destination on 2 November. After replenishing her ammunition and stores, she returned to Leyte for several days, until the middle of November. Her crew detected severe vibrations in her No. 4 engine; the propeller shaft had broken and the propeller was trailing. She was therefore detached on 18 November for repairs in California, via Ulithi. While in Ulithi, divers discovered cracks in a strut for No. 3 propeller shaft; now only two screws were operational. She reached San Pedro in California on 15 December. She entered the Terminal Island Navy Yard shortly after reaching port. Repairs lasted until 8 February 1945, and by 28 February, she departed for Pearl Harbor. Wichita arrived in Hawaii on 6 March, before departing five days later for Ulithi.

==== Invasion of Okinawa ====
Wichita arrived in Ulithi on 20 March, and was assigned to Task Force 54 (TF 54) the next day. She put to sea to take part in the invasion of Okinawa. The ship was placed in Task Unit 54.2.3 to cover minesweepers off Okinawa on 25 March. On the afternoon of the following day, Wichita bombarded Japanese positions on the island, from 13:50 to 16:30. Japanese aircraft attacked the ships early the next morning; Wichita's gunners shot down one of the aircraft. Later that day, the ship resumed bombardment duties in preparation for the amphibious invasion. She continued to shell the island through 28 March. The next day, she retired to Kerama Retto to replenish her ammunition. The ship then returned to Okinawa later that day to cover underwater demolition teams as they cleared beach obstacles. Wichita continued to support the demolition teams the next day, as well as shelling targets ashore. On 31 March, Wichita bombarded the sea wall to create a breach in preparation for the landings.

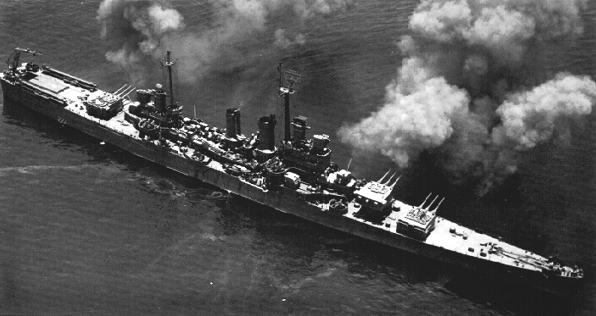
Wichita firing a broadside

The invasion began on 1 April, and Wichita provided gunfire support to the landing troops on the southern beaches. At around 12:00, she left the firing line to replenish her ammunition. She resumed bombardment the following day and resupplied again on 3 April before covering minesweepers on 4 April. During the night of 4–5 April, Wichita shelled the Japanese defenders on Okinawa. The ship was assigned to join Task Group 51.19 the next day to bombard Tsugen Shima in company with Tuscaloosa and the battleships Maryland and Arkansas. Japanese aircraft appeared, which forced the cancellation of the mission. Nevertheless, Wichita shelled Japanese shore batteries at Chiyama Shima that evening.

Late on 6 April, an A6M Zero attempted to attack Wichita. The fighter came down through a break in the clouds on Wichita's port side. The ship's anti-aircraft gunners immediately opened fire; a burst from one of the 20 mm guns shot away the Zero's tail. The plane veered away, out of control, and dropped its 500-pound (230 kg) bomb, which fell approximately 50 feet (15 m) from the ship. The Zero's wing clipped the deck before the plane crashed into the sea. Eleven men were wounded in the attack, though the ship remained undamaged. The following day, Wichita steamed into Nakagusuku Bay to shell a coastal battery. Shells from the Japanese guns landed close to the ship, but no hits were scored before Wichita neutralized the battery. Over the next two days, the ship continued to bombard Japanese defenses on the island, until she retired to replenish ammunition on 10 April.

Wichita continued to provide gunfire support throughout the rest of the month. On 27 April, a small caliber shell penetrated a fuel oil tank five feet below the waterline. After temporary repairs while still off Okinawa proved unsuccessful, Wichita returned to Kerama Retto where the damage was repaired on 29–30 April. Wichita then returned to the gun line. On 12 May, the ship was damaged by friendly fire. A 5-inch round struck the port aircraft catapult; shell fragments hit the shield of an antiaircraft director, killing one man and injuring eleven others. She departed the area to rest and refit at Leyte, returning to Okinawa on 18 June. Wichita continued to provide gunfire support to the troops on Okinawa through July, as part of Task Unit 2. On 15 August, the ship's crew received word that the war with Japan was over. Wichita was awarded 13 battle stars for her service during World War II.

=== Post-war ===
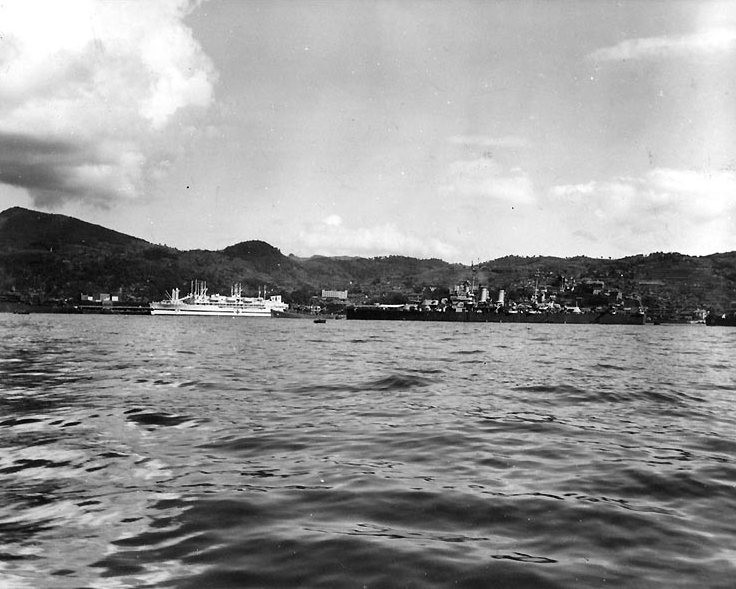
Wichita and Haven in Nagasaki harbor

Wichita was assigned to the occupying force shortly after the end of the war. She departed Okinawa on 10 September for Nagasaki, arriving the following day as part of Task Group 55.7. Wichita was one of the first major warships to reach Japan; she was escorted by a destroyer, a pair of destroyer escorts, two minesweepers, and the hospital ship Haven. Wichita was transferred to Sasebo on 25 September for four days before she returned to Nagasaki on 29 September. She returned to Sasebo shortly thereafter, and while she was there, a severe typhoon struck the area on 9–11 October. Wichita was not damaged during the storms. While at Sasebo, Wichita's crew inspected the Japanese ships and harbor installations to ensure Japanese compliance with the terms of surrender.

On 5 November, Wichita was assigned to Operation Magic Carpet, the repatriation of American military personnel. She refueled in Tokyo before departing for San Francisco. The ship reached San Francisco on 24 November, where she went into drydock at the Mare Island Naval Shipyard two days later. Repairs and modifications for further Magic Carpet duty were completed by 1 December. Wichita departed for Hawaii on 6 December, reaching Pearl Harbor on 12 December before proceeding to the Marianas. There, the ship loaded servicemen from Saipan and steamed back to San Francisco, arriving on 12 January 1946. She left port on 27 January bound for the east coast of the United States; she transited the Panama Canal on 5–9 February and reached Philadelphia on 14 February. There, she was assigned to the Sixteenth Fleet and was placed in reserve on 15 July. Wichita was decommissioned on 3 February 1947 and laid up at Philadelphia.

In the late 1940s, the Navy considered converting Wichita into a guided-missile cruiser, but Boston and Canberra were chosen instead. On 1 March 1959, the ship was stricken from the Naval Vessel Register and sold on 14 August to the Union Minerals and Alloys Corporation.
