= French battleship Jean Bart (1940) =

French battleship

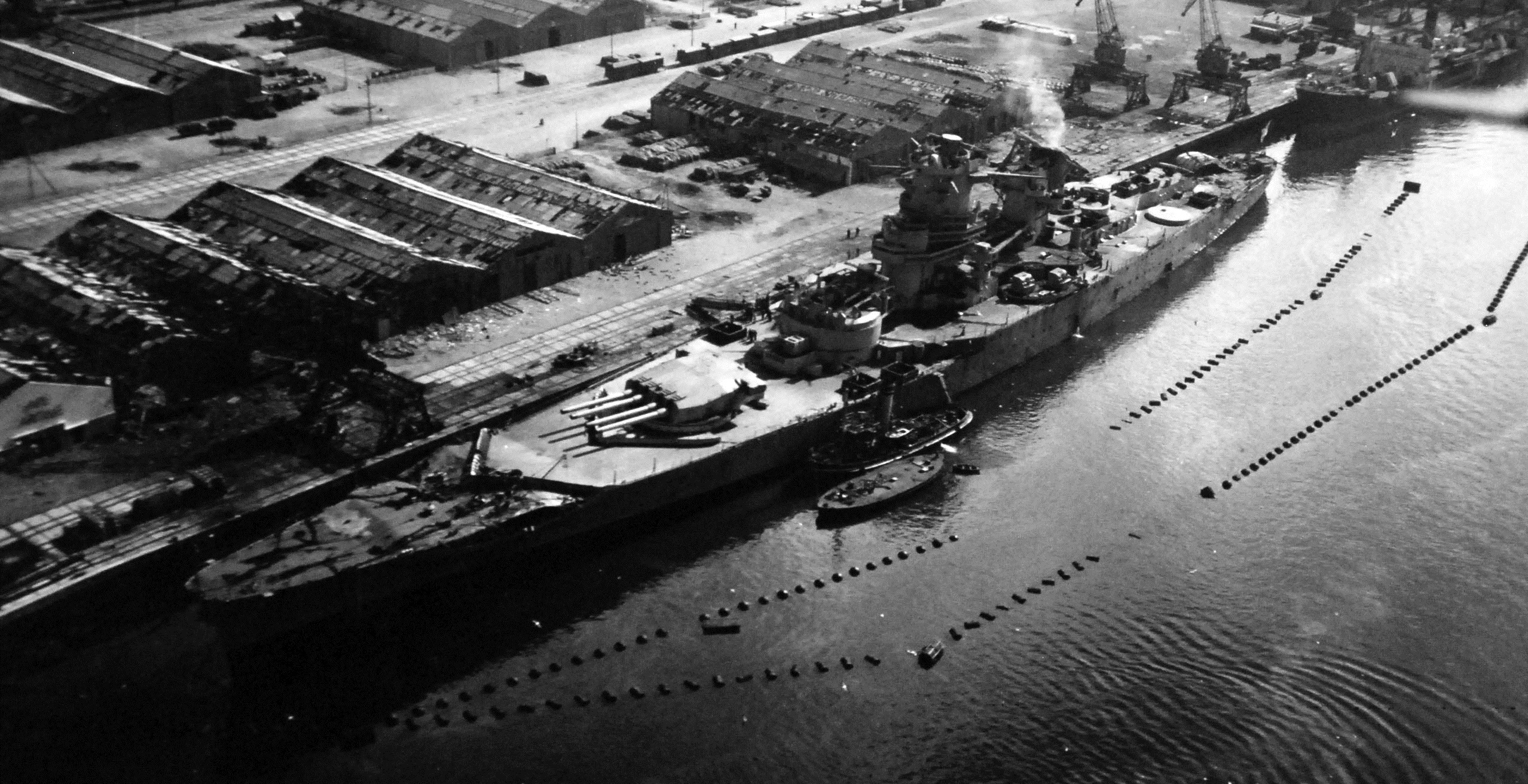
- Jean Bart photographed by a plane from USS Ranger during Operation Torch in November 1942

History

France
- Name: Jean Bart
- Namesake: Jean Bart
- Laid down: 12 December 1936
- Launched: 6 March 1940
- Commissioned: 8 January 1949
- In service: 1 May 1955
- Out of service: 1 August 1957
- Stricken: 10 February 1970
- Fate: Broken up, 1970

General characteristics (Designed configuration)
- Class & type: Richelieu-class battleship
- Displacement: Standard: 37,250 long tons (37,850 t); Full load: 43,992 long tons (44,698 t)
- Length: 247.85 m (813 ft 2 in)
- Beam: 33.08 m (108 ft 6 in)
- Draft: Full load: 9.9 m (32 ft 6 in)
- Installed power: 6 × Indret Sural boilers; 155,000 shp (116,000 kW)
- Propulsion: 4 × Parsons geared turbines; 4 × screws
- Speed: 32 knots (59 km/h; 37 mph)
- Range: 9,500 nautical miles (17,600 km; 10,900 mi) at 15 kn (28 km/h; 17 mph)
- Complement: 1,569
- Armament: 8 × 380 mm (15-inch)/45 Modèle 1935 guns; 9 × 152 mm (6 in)/50 guns; 12 × 100 mm (3.9 in) anti-aircraft (AA) guns; 8 × 37 mm (1.5 in) AA guns; 20 × 13.2 mm (0.52 in) Hotchkiss machine guns
- Armor: Belt: 330 mm (13 in); Main deck: 170 mm (6.7 in); Turrets: 430 mm (17 in); Conning tower: 340 mm (13 in)
- Aircraft carried: 4 × Loire 130 seaplanes
- Aviation facilities: 2 × catapults

General characteristics (As completed)
- Displacement: Normal: 43,052 t (42,372 long tons); Full load: 49,196 t (48,419 long tons)
- Draft: 10.9 m (36 ft)
- Complement: 2,220
- Sensors & processing systems: 1 × DRBV 11 air/surface search radar; 1 × DRBV 20 air search radar; 1 × DRBV 30 navigation radar; 1 × DRBC 10A fire control (FC) radar; 6 × ACAE FC radar; 5 × DRBC 30B FC radar
- Armament: 8 × 380 mm guns; 9 × 152 mm guns; 24 × 100 mm AA guns; 28 × 57 mm (2.2 in) AA guns

Jean Bart (French pronunciation: [ʒɑ̃ baʁ]) was a French fast battleship, the second and final member of the Richelieu class. Built as a response to the Italian Littorio class, the Richelieus were based on their immediate predecessors of the Dunkerque class with the same unconventional arrangement that grouped their main battery forward in two quadruple gun turrets. They were scaled up to accommodate a much more powerful main battery of eight 380 mm (15 in) guns (compared to the 330 mm (13 in) guns of the Dunkerques), with increased armor to protect them from guns of the same caliber. Jean Bart was laid down in 1936 and was launched in 1940, following the outbreak of World War II in Europe. The ship was not complete by the time Germany won the Battle of France, and Jean Bart was rushed to Casablanca to escape advancing German troops. She had only one of her main turrets installed, along with a handful of anti-aircraft guns.

While in Casablanca, the French attempted to prepare the ship for action as much as was possible in light of limited infrastructure and the parts to complete the vessel. Her anti-aircraft armament was slowly increased as guns became available and a search radar was fitted in 1942. In November, American and British forces invaded French North Africa in Operation Torch; Jean Bart initially helped to resist the attack, engaging in a gunnery duel with the battleship USS Massachusetts before being badly damaged by American dive bombers. Following the defection of French forces in the region to the Allied side, the French attempted to have the ship completed in the United States, but the requests came to nothing as the US Navy had no interest in the project. Jean Bart was accordingly repaired as much as possible in Casablanca, thereafter spending the rest of the war as a training ship there.

In 1945, discussions as to the fate of the ship considered converting her into an aircraft carrier, finishing her as a battleship, or discarding her altogether. The decision was ultimately made to finish her as a battleship, a process that took several years. Most work on the ship was completed by 1955, when she formally entered active service, and she conducted two overseas cruises to visit Denmark and the United States shortly thereafter. Richelieu and Jean Bart cruised together just once, on 30 January 1956. Jean Bart took part in the French intervention in the Suez Crisis in November 1956, including a brief four-shot bombardment of Port Said. Reduced to reserve in August 1957, she was used as a barracks ship until 1961. She remained, unused, in the French Navy's inventory until 1970, when she was struck from the naval register and sold for scrap.

== Design ==
When in 1934 Italy announced that it would begin building two Littorio-class battleships armed with 381 mm (15 in) guns, the French Navy immediately began preparations to counter them. The small Dunkerque-class battleships that had been ordered provided the template for the next French battleship design, but it needed to be enlarged to match the new Italian vessels, both in terms of offensive and defensive characteristics. The design staff considered 380 and 406 mm (16 in) guns, but the latter could not be incorporated in a design that remained within the 35,000 long tons (35,560 t) limit imposed by the Washington Naval Treaty and was quickly discarded. The Dunkerques carried their armament in two quadruple gun turrets arrayed in a superfiring pair forward of the superstructure, and the designers experimented with other arrangements, including combinations of triple and twin turrets, but the need to minimize the length of the armor belt (and thus its weight) necessitated a repetition of the Dunkerque layout.

=== Characteristics ===
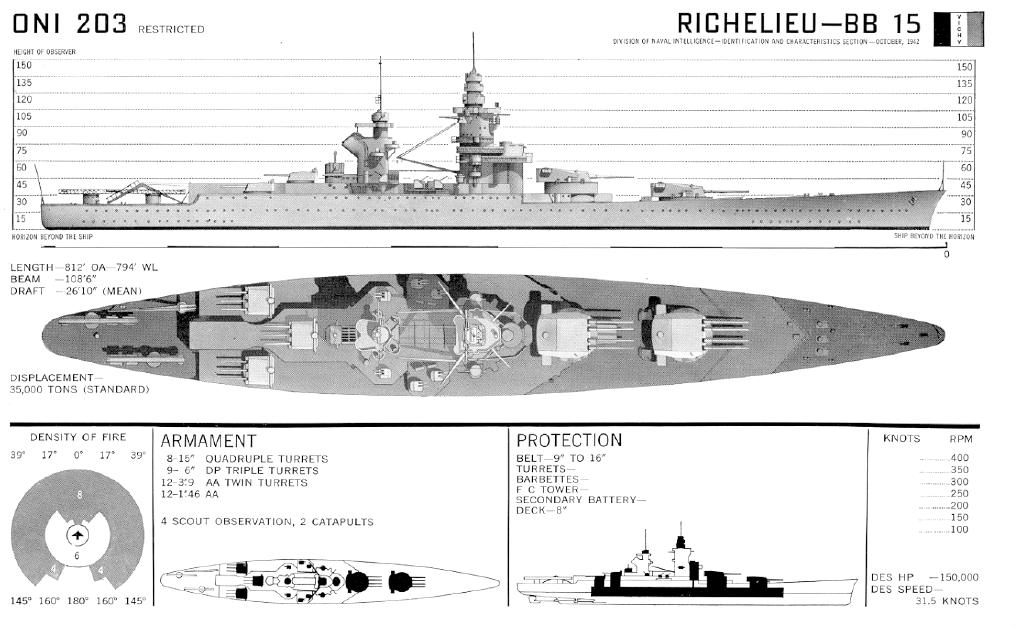
Recognition drawing of Jean Bart's sister Richelieu in her designed configuration

Jean Bart displaced 37,250 long tons (37,850 t) standard and 43,992 long tons (44,698 t) fully loaded. She had an overall length of 247.85 m (813 ft 2 in), a beam of 33.08 m (108 ft 6 in) and a maximum draft of 9.9 m (32 ft 6 in). Her crew numbered 1,569 officers and men. The ship had a very long forecastle deck that improved seakeeping forward and only stepped down to main deck level toward the stern. She carried four Loire 130 seaplanes on the fantail, and the aircraft facilities consisted of a steam catapult and a crane to handle the floatplanes.

She was powered by four Parsons geared steam turbines and six oil-fired Sural water-tube boilers, which were vented through a single large funnel that was combined with the main mast, a structure referred to as a mack. Her propulsion system developed a total of 155,000 shaft horsepower (116,000 kW) and yielded a maximum speed of 32 knots (59 km/h; 37 mph). At a cruising speed of 15 knots (28 km/h; 17 mph), the ship could steam for 9,500 nautical miles (17,600 km; 10,900 mi).

Jean Bart was armed with eight 380 mm/45 Modèle (Mle) 1935 guns arranged in two quadruple gun turrets, (Note: /45 refers to the length of the gun in terms of calibers; a /45 gun is 45 times long as it is in bore diameter.) both of which were placed in a superfiring pair forward of the superstructure. Her secondary armament consisted of nine 152 mm (6 in) /55 Mle 1930 guns mounted in three triple turrets, arranged on the rear superstructure. Heavy anti-aircraft (AA) defense consisted of twelve 100 mm (3.9 in) /45 Mle 1930 anti-aircraft guns in six twin turrets; these were clustered amidships, three per side. Close range anti-aircraft defense was provided by a battery of eight 37 mm (1.5 in) guns in twin mounts and twenty 13.2 mm (0.52 in) machine guns in four quadruple and two twin mounts.

The ship's belt armor was 330 mm (13 in) thick amidships, and the main battery turrets were protected by 430 mm (17 in) of armor plate on the faces. The main armored deck was 170 mm (6.7 in) thick, and the conning tower had 340 mm (13 in) thick sides.

== Service history ==
=== Construction and escape to Casablanca ===
The French Navy awarded the contract for Jean Bart on 27 May 1936 to the Chantiers de Penhoët shipyard in Saint-Nazaire, although construction was sub-contracted to the adjacent A. C. Loire shipyard as its own facilities were busy with the Dunkerque-class battleship Strasbourg. The keel for Jean Bart was laid down on 12 December, less than three weeks before the Washington Treaty expired. The construction of Jean Bart and her sister ship Richelieu placed France in violation of the terms of the treaty, which had limited the country to build 70,000 long tons (71,000 t) of battleships during the ten-year building moratorium. The two Richelieus and the two Dunkerque-class battleships totaled 123,000 long tons (125,000 t) of battleship tonnage. France used the Anglo-German Naval Agreement, which Britain had unilaterally signed with Nazi Germany (and in the process effectively nullified the naval disarmament clauses of the Treaty of Versailles) in June 1935 to dismiss British objections to the new ships. Serious work on the ship was nevertheless delayed owing to the shortage of dockyard workers and the need to complete the hull of the Strasbourg so she could be launched later that month. The dry dock used to build the ship was A. C. Loire's newly completed Caquot dock, named for its designer, Albert Caquot, though it was commonly referred to as the "Jean Bart dock". Work on the ship initially proceeded slowly, though the increase in tensions with Germany in early 1939 leading to the German invasion of Poland and the outbreak of World War II led to greater emphasis being placed on completing the ship.

She was launched on 6 March 1940, but following the initial German successes in the Battle of France in May, the builders realized that the normal process of fitting-out would have to be abandoned in favor of preparing the vessel to be moved from the port. Work on the ship's propulsion system was greatly accelerated: some 3,500 workers were assigned to the project, and in the span of a month, three of her boilers, two sets of turbines, two turbo generators, and two pumps had been installed, along with critical internal communications systems. The outer shaft screws were installed on 6 and 7 June, and her three aft boilers had fires lit for the first time from 12 to 14 June. Her rudder and anchor chains were installed, and her double bottom was sealed. At this time, the ship's armament was mostly incomplete; the forward main battery turret had its guns and armor plate installed, but it lacked necessary shell handling equipment and fire control systems. The superfiring turret was without its guns or armor and none of the secondary turrets had been installed. During the rush to prepare the ship to depart, a pair of twin-mount 90 mm (3.5 in) Mle 1930 anti-aircraft guns, taken from the net layer Gladiateur, was installed on 18 June in place of the 100 mm guns, construction of which had been delayed, but they had no ammunition or directors at the time. Three of the 37 mm guns and six of the 13.2 mm mounts were installed, and these were the only usable weapons aboard the ship at the time of her departure, albeit only under local control as their director systems were also still incomplete.

While work was still being completed, the ship's commander, Capitaine de vaisseau Pierre-Jean Ronarc'h received orders on 11 June to depart for Casablanca in French Morocco as soon as was practical. He estimated that 19 June would be the best opportunity based on the tides, and early that morning Jean Bart was towed out of the fitting-out dock by three tugboats at 03:30 and into a channel that had been quickly but not sufficiently dredged to allow her escape. (Note: The channel was to have been 9 m (30 ft) deep and 70 m (230 ft) wide to allow an easy passage of the battleship, but it was only 8.5 m (28 ft) deep and 50 m (160 ft) wide. There had not been sufficient time to complete the dredging before German forces reached the area.) The ship accidentally grounded in the darkness, bending one of her screw blades, but the tugs pulled her free and at 04:45, the crew got Jean Bart's engines started. Shortly thereafter, three German Heinkel He 111 bombers arrived at a height of 1,000 m (3,300 ft) to attack the ship. One of the aircraft scored a hit with a 100 kg (220 lb) bomb that struck between the main battery turrets but did insignificant damage. Jean Bart increased speed to 12 knots (22 km/h; 14 mph) and at 06:30, rendezvoused with the destroyers Le Hardi and Mameluk, which were to escort her to Casablanca. The British destroyer HMS Vanquisher and two tugs met the ship at sea, offering to tow Jean Bart to Britain, but Ronarc'h declined the offer. Jean Bart took on fuel oil at sea from a pair of tankers and at 18:00, she left the area with the two destroyers. While cruising off Lorient the next day, the destroyer Épée relieved Le Hardi and the three ships continued on at a speed of 24 knots (44 km/h; 28 mph). They arrived in Casablanca at 17:00 on 22 June.

=== At Casablanca ===
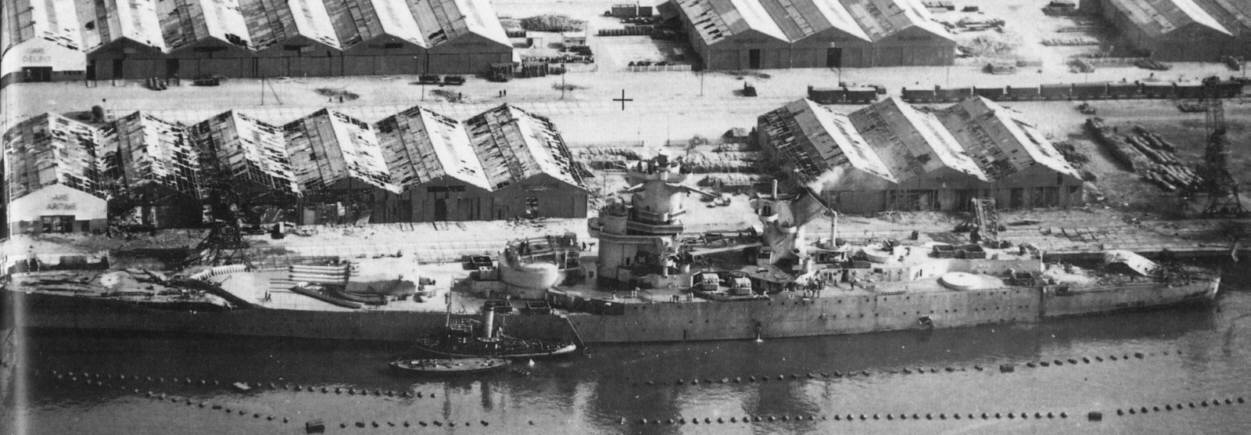
Jean Bart incomplete in Casablanca harbor, taken from an airplane of USS Ranger

After arriving in Casablanca, Jean Bart had most of her anti-aircraft guns removed to strengthen the defenses of the port: the 90 mm and 37 mm guns were moved to the jetties protecting the harbor and two of the six 13.2 mm guns were put on trucks. Following their defeat in the Battle of France, the French signed the Armistice of 22 June 1940, ending their participation in the conflict. During the peace negotiations, the French proposed neutralizing Jean Bart and several other ships in Oran, French Algeria, but they ultimately agreed to take Jean Bart and Richelieu to Toulon to be demobilized. The Germans later decided against permitting the move, as they feared the British would try to seize the ship during the passage through the Strait of Gibraltar; the British, meanwhile, were under the mistaken impression that the Germans sought to seize the French fleet for their own use. This led to Operation Catapult, a series of attacks on French warships to neutralize vessels that would not defect to the Free French.

The attacks prompted Ronarc'h to take precautions to protect his ship. He ordered the open barbettes for the secondary turrets and the incomplete superfiring turret covered with concrete, and much of the hull was sealed. He moved the ship to shallow water on 11 August. Eleven days later, CV Émile Barthes replaced Ronarc'h. In September work to ready the ship for combat as much as could be done with the limited material in Casablanca began. On 7 September, the ship received sixteen 13.2 mm guns and seventeen 8 mm (0.31 in) machine guns, though only one of the latter was actually installed as the light machine guns were of limited use. In 1941, an improvised director was fabricated using a torpedo tube platform removed from the old destroyer Enseigne Gabolde as a base for a 14 m (46 ft) rangefinder. For navigational purposes, a 3 m (9.8 ft) rangefinder was installed on the conning tower and two more were added to the bridge wings in October.

The ship's anti-aircraft battery was strengthened in April 1942 with the addition of four 37 mm guns in single mounts and a pair of new twin 90 mm guns. By May, the forward main battery turret had been rendered fully operational and on 19 May, Jean Bart conducted test firing. The makeshift director did not work particularly well, so a triangulation system using observers aboard the ship and in two points at Dar Bouazza and Sidi Abderrahman to direct the ship's guns was improvised. Four 37 mm guns in twin mounts were installed in June, along with another pair of 90 mm twin mounts, but three of the four 37 mm single guns were removed. A DEM radar was installed and tests over the following months demonstrated that the set was able to detect aircraft at ranges as far as 70 km (43 mi), but owing to the cluttered harbor facilities around the ship, its abilities to detect surface ships could not be examined. The radar was pronounced ready for service on 6 October. In early November, the ship received a fifth 90 mm twin mount, with a sixth planned; at that time, the anti-aircraft battery consisted of five 90 mm twin mounts, five 37 mm guns (two in twins and one in a single mount), eighteen 13.2 mm guns (two twin and fourteen individual mounts) and one 8 mm machine gun.

==== Operation Torch ====
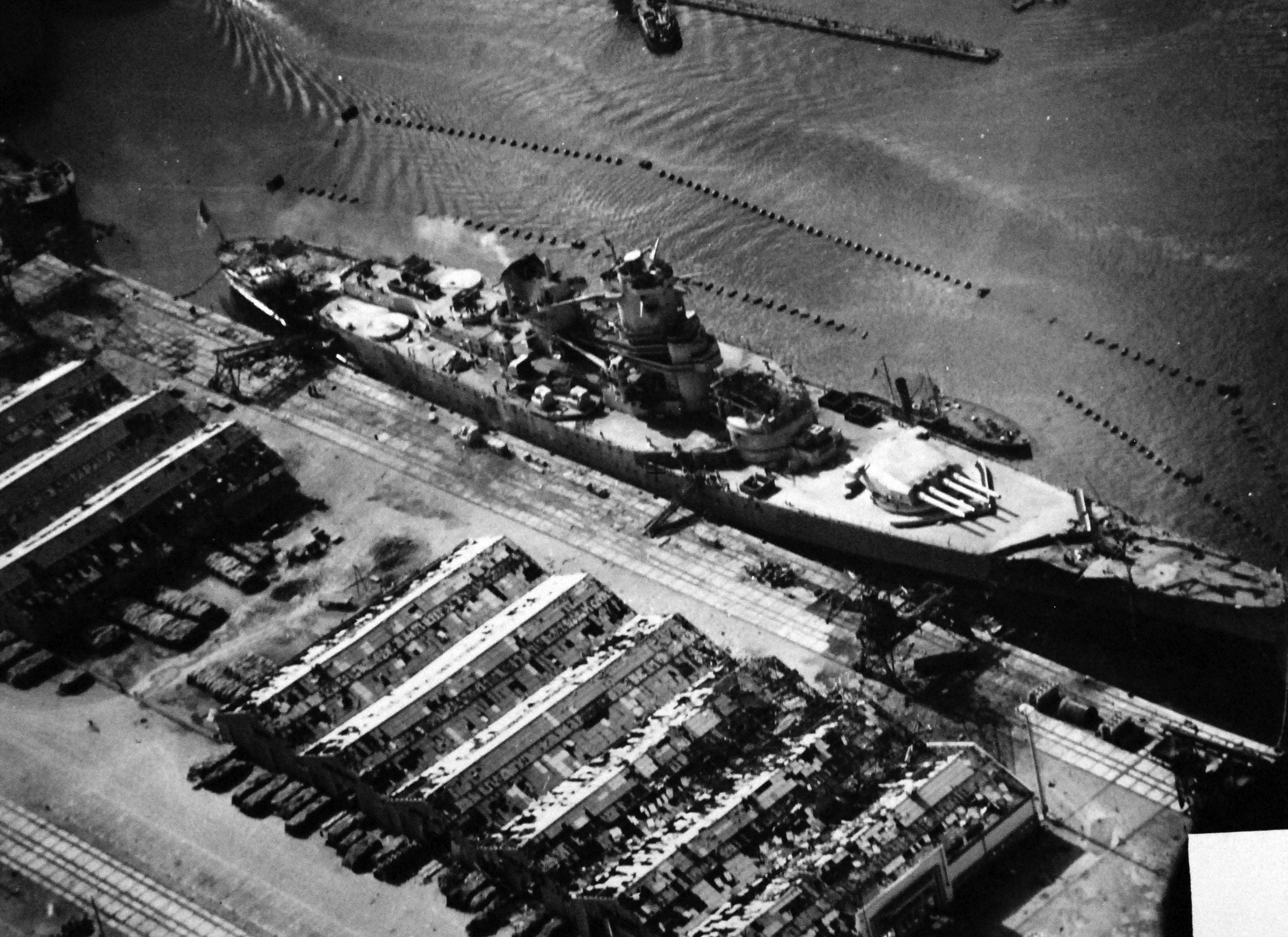
Jean Bart attacked by planes of USS Ranger

American and British forces embarked on Operation Torch, the invasion of French North Africa, on 8 November. An American covering force that included the battleship Massachusetts (armed with nine 406 mm (16 in) guns), the aircraft carriers Ranger and Suwanee, and three heavy cruisers led the invasion fleet that landed near Casablanca; the Americans hoped the French defenders would quickly surrender and defect to the Free French. A French reconnaissance aircraft detected the fleet at 07:00 that morning, and to oppose the landing, the French had one light cruiser, nine destroyers, and several submarines, in addition to the coastal battery at El Hank and Jean Bart, which would be employed as a floating battery. Before the French vessels could mount a significant challenge to the invasion, Massachusetts and the heavy cruisers Tuscaloosa and Wichita, began bombarding the port while a group of SBD Dauntless dive bombers armed with 500 lb (230 kg) bombs from Ranger struck the ships in the harbor. Jean Bart received a pair of bomb hits at 07:18; the first damaged the port catapult, started a fire, and caused the manual steering compartment to flood. The second struck the quay and exploded, the blast causing significant deformation to the hull plating on the starboard side.

In return, Jean Bart fired four two-gun salvos between 07:08 and 07:19, but when the French cruiser and destroyers attempted to sortie, they laid a smoke screen that drifted and blocked observation of the American cruisers. Massachusetts then engaged Jean Bart and at 07:25, scored a hit that penetrated both of the French ship's armor decks and exploded in the empty magazines for the missing 152 mm guns. Another salvo landed close to Jean Bart's bow at 07:35 and deformed the hull plating. Another shell struck the quay a minute later, hurling fragments of concrete that injured anti-aircraft gunners and caused additional flooding. At 07:37, another 406 mm shell hit the ship, passing through the funnel and striking the edge of the armor deck. Another shell struck the edge of the quay, punched the outer plating, and was deflected down by the armor belt. It then passed through the bottom of the hull, burying itself in the sea floor, where it failed to explode. At 08:06, another salvo struck the ship with a pair of shells. The first struck the operational main battery turret, pushing the front glacis down and jamming the turret, and the second hit the superfiring barbette. This shell broke up on impact, but fragments nevertheless damaged the armor deck. One more shell from Massachusetts struck the ship at 08:10 on the quarterdeck, where it penetrated the sloped armor deck and exploded in the ballast compartment, causing additional flooding in the steering compartment.

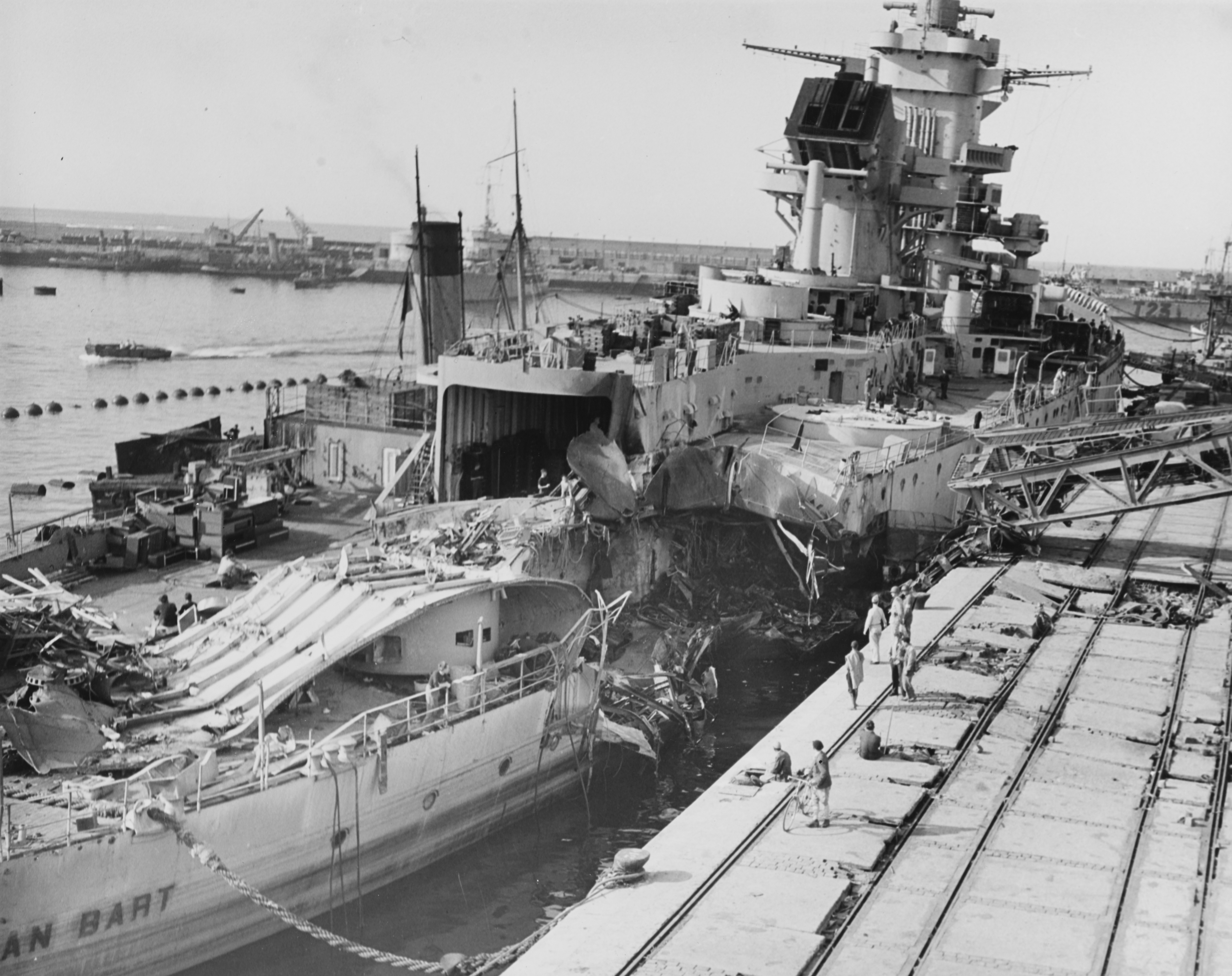
Damage to Jean Bart's stern from the second bomb hit, photographed in Casablanca on November 16, 1942

Despite the numerous shell and bomb hits, Jean Bart had not been seriously damaged, though this was unknown to the Americans. Workers quickly cut away the deformed steel that jammed the main battery turret and it was back in operation at 17:24. Only one of the 406 mm shells could have threatened the ship's survival, as an explosion in the 152 mm magazine could have destroyed the vessel had it been full of propellant charges. The next day, the ship's 90 mm guns were used to fire on advancing ground troops, and on 10 November, Jean Bart's forward turret engaged the heavy cruiser Augusta between 11:41 and 11:51, nearly hitting with her second salvo. Three of her nine two-gun salvos straddled Augusta, forcing the cruiser to withdraw at high speed and prompting Ranger to launch a second air strike on the ship.

Nine Dauntlesses, this time armed with 1,000 lb (450 kg) bombs, and eight F4F Wildcat fighters attacked the ship at 15:00. The fighters strafed Jean Bart's anti-aircraft batteries to suppress them for the Dauntless attacks. Two of the bombers scored hits; the first caused extensive damage to the forecastle and the second destroyed a substantial part of the hull toward the stern. Both bombs caused serious fires that were suppressed by 20:00. Extensive flooding led the ship to settle by the stern and submerged the turbo generator room, while shock from the bomb explosions disabled the main diesel generators, leaving the backup diesels as the only source of electrical power. In the course of the engagements with American forces, 22 men had been killed and the same number had been wounded. She had fired just 25 shells from her main battery, but despite the significant damage from the bomb hits on 10 November, her turret remained operational, as did the 90 mm guns, though both batteries were without power.

=== With the Free French ===
French forces in North Africa signed an armistice on 11 November, prompting the Germans to invade the rest of Vichy France, which in turn led François Darlan, the former Chief of Staff of the French Navy, to defect to the Allies with the rest of the fleet. Repair work to make the ship seaworthy had already begun on 11 November, and by 15 February 1943, the outboard turbines were in service and manual steering controls had been repaired. Admiral Raymond Fenard, the head of the French naval mission to the US, requested that the US Navy take the ship to the United States to be repaired and completed, as they had begun to do with Richelieu. Fenard issued a report to the US Vice Chief of Naval Operations, Admiral Frederick J. Horne, on 15 April detailing the status of Jean Bart, but Horne replied on 1 May that the ship could not be completed to her original specifications. Five days later, the US Navy agreed that the ship would be taken to the United States in September, which necessitated repairs to the steering motors.

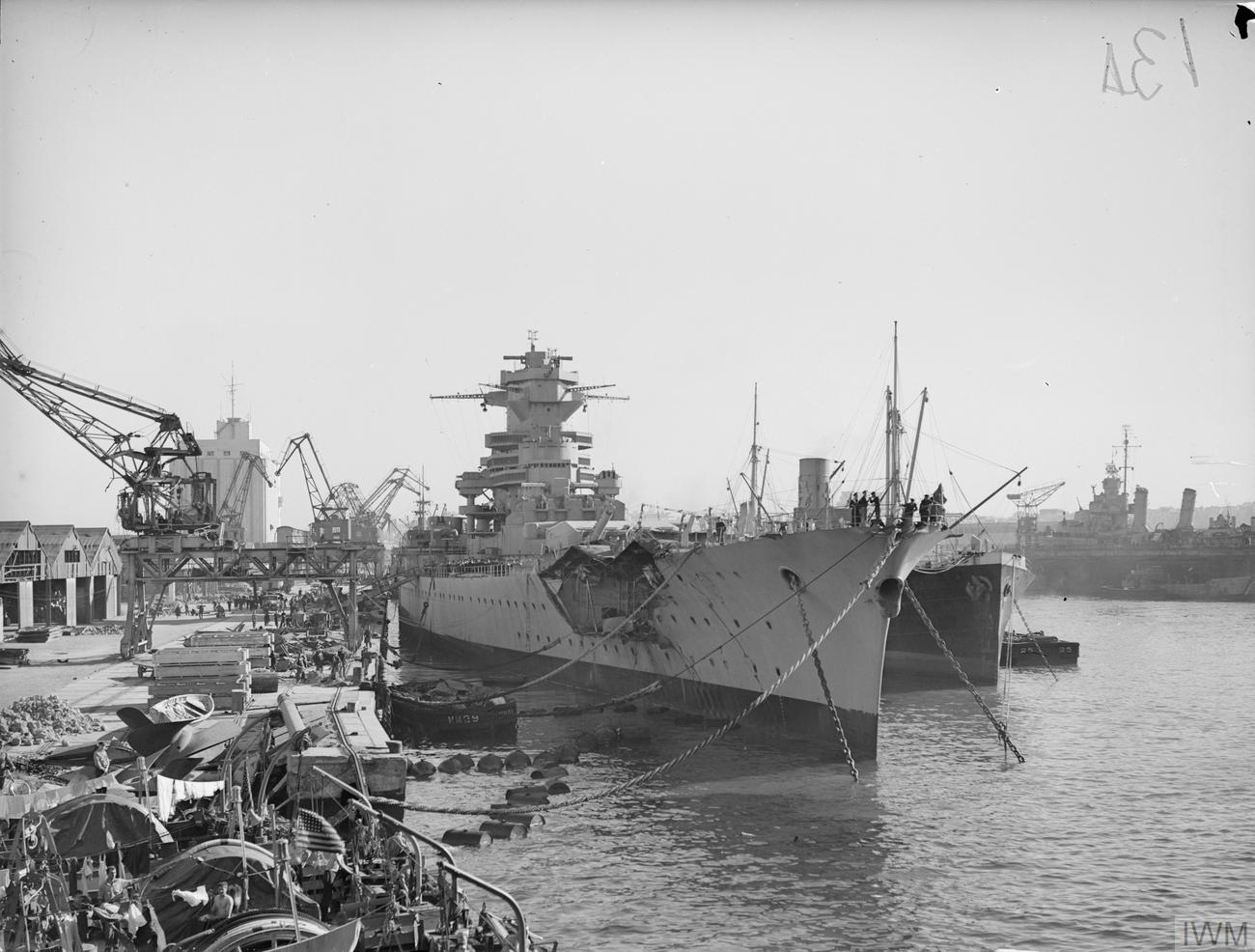
Jean Bart under repair in Casablanca, January 1943

The Free French Service Central des Constructions et Armes Navales (Central Naval Technical Department) created two proposals to complete the ship with as few alterations from her current state as possible; both involved replacing the 380 mm guns with 340 mm (13.4 in) guns from the old battleship Lorraine, since Jean Bart's guns were needed to replace the damaged guns aboard Richelieu. The first variant called for the quarterdeck to be modified to carry two large catapults capable of launching American TBF Avenger or British Fairey Barracuda torpedo bombers and F6F Hellcat or Supermarine Seafire fighters. The total complement was to be six aircraft. In place of the superfiring main turret, three secondary turrets, and the 90 mm mounts, she would receive thirty 5 in (130 mm) /38 caliber dual-purpose guns in fifteen twin turrets. These would be supplemented by sixty-four Bofors 40 mm (1.6 in) guns in quadruple mounts and fifty 20 mm (0.79 in) Oerlikon cannon in single mounts. New fire control equipment was to be installed, including US-built directors and a Mk 4 fire control radar. The second proposal was less ambitious; the aircraft facilities were abandoned in favor of seventeen twin 5 in turrets, while the 40 mm battery would be increased to twenty quadruple mounts.

Horne rejected both proposals on 18 August and Fenard responded with a proposal to complete the ship as an aircraft carrier, which Horne also refused. On 8 December, Fenard appealed directly to Horne's superior, Admiral Ernest King, the Commander-in-Chief, United States Fleet and Chief of Naval Operations, but King informed Fenard in March 1944 that the US Navy had no interest in diverting critical wartime resources to complete the ship. By that time in the war, the US Navy had more than enough battleships and aircraft carriers to fulfill its operational needs and moreover, American shipyards could not easily reproduce the parts necessary to complete the ship according to any of the proposals; the US had only agreed to repair and modernize Richelieu, which had been in a more complete state than Jean Bart, after significant pressure from Britain. Jean Bart instead remained in Casablanca, where Free French authorities had already set about readying the ship for sea.

Options to complete the ship without US assistance were limited; the scuttling of the French fleet in Toulon in November 1942 wrecked much of the shipyard facilities, and Brest would not be liberated until September 1944. The French inquired about the possibility of taking the ship to Gibraltar, but the shipyard there was overwhelmed with more critical projects. Nevertheless, the shipyard workers in Casablanca had readied the ship for sea trials by September 1943. During these operations, she was accompanied by the destroyers Basque and Le Fortuné and three US destroyers. Though her hull was still badly deformed from the damage incurred during Operation Torch and had not been cleaned of biofouling, she reached a speed of 22.5 knots (41.7 km/h; 25.9 mph). For the remainder of the war, the vessel was used as a training ship.

=== Completion ===
With the end of the war in sight by early 1945, the French naval command began to make plans for the postwar fleet. On 22 February, they decided that Jean Bart would be completed, but there was no consensus as to how the ship was to be finished. One faction, including Fenard as well as Admirals Pierre Barjot and Louis Kahn (the latter being the Chief of Naval Construction), advocated converting the ship into an aircraft carrier, while others argued that the ship should be completed as a battleship. A third group suggested scrapping the ship and focusing on other projects. In July, Kahn prepared a proposal that would have produced a carrier with a capacity of forty aircraft (and fourteen spares), armed with a battery of sixteen 130 mm (5.1 in) anti-aircraft guns in twin mounts, and protected with an armored flight deck that was 90 mm thick. Displacement was fixed at 40,000 t (39,000 long tons). The project would have cost 5 billion francs and taken five years to complete, which caused considerable opposition in the naval command, including Fenard. They objected to the cost and delays, along with the fact that the number of aircraft was half that of contemporary American and British carriers.

With the fate of the ship still in question, she left Casablanca on 25 August, bound for Cherbourg, which she reached four days later. At a meeting on 21 September, the naval command ruled out discarding the vessel. Given the objections to the aircraft carrier conversion, the construction department drew up estimates for how long it would take to manufacture the necessary 380 mm gun barrels, rebuild the superfiring turret, and stockpile the necessary munitions for the guns; the resulting figures projected that it would take four years to complete the vessel and another year to manufacture the shells and charges. The decision was made to finish Jean Bart along the same lines as Richelieu, albeit with improved anti-aircraft defenses. The naval historians John Jordan and Robert Dumas note that despite criticisms from officers of the French naval air arm, "there can be no doubt that the decision against a carrier conversion was correct in that it would have resulted in a ship which was poor value for the effort and expenditure involved."

Jean Bart was then moved to Brest, where she was dry-docked for repairs to her hull that began on 11 March 1946. During this period, her propulsion system was also completed, her main and secondary turrets were installed, and her superstructure was modified for the new radar and fire control equipment that would be later installed. Work on the hull was completed on 26 November 1947, which allowed her to be moved from the dry dock to the fitting-out quay. There, further modifications were made to the superstructure and the guns for her primary and secondary turrets were installed. Thereafter followed another stint in the dry dock from 20 March to 9 October 1948, which involved the installation of bulges to the lower hull and her propeller shafts were repaired. Initial testing of her propulsion machinery began on 4 December, followed by full tests that began in January 1949. She then conducted gunnery tests, and in May, she was assigned to the Groupe des bâtiments de ligne (Battleship Group) with Richelieu, though the unit was disbanded in 1950.

=== Post war active service ===
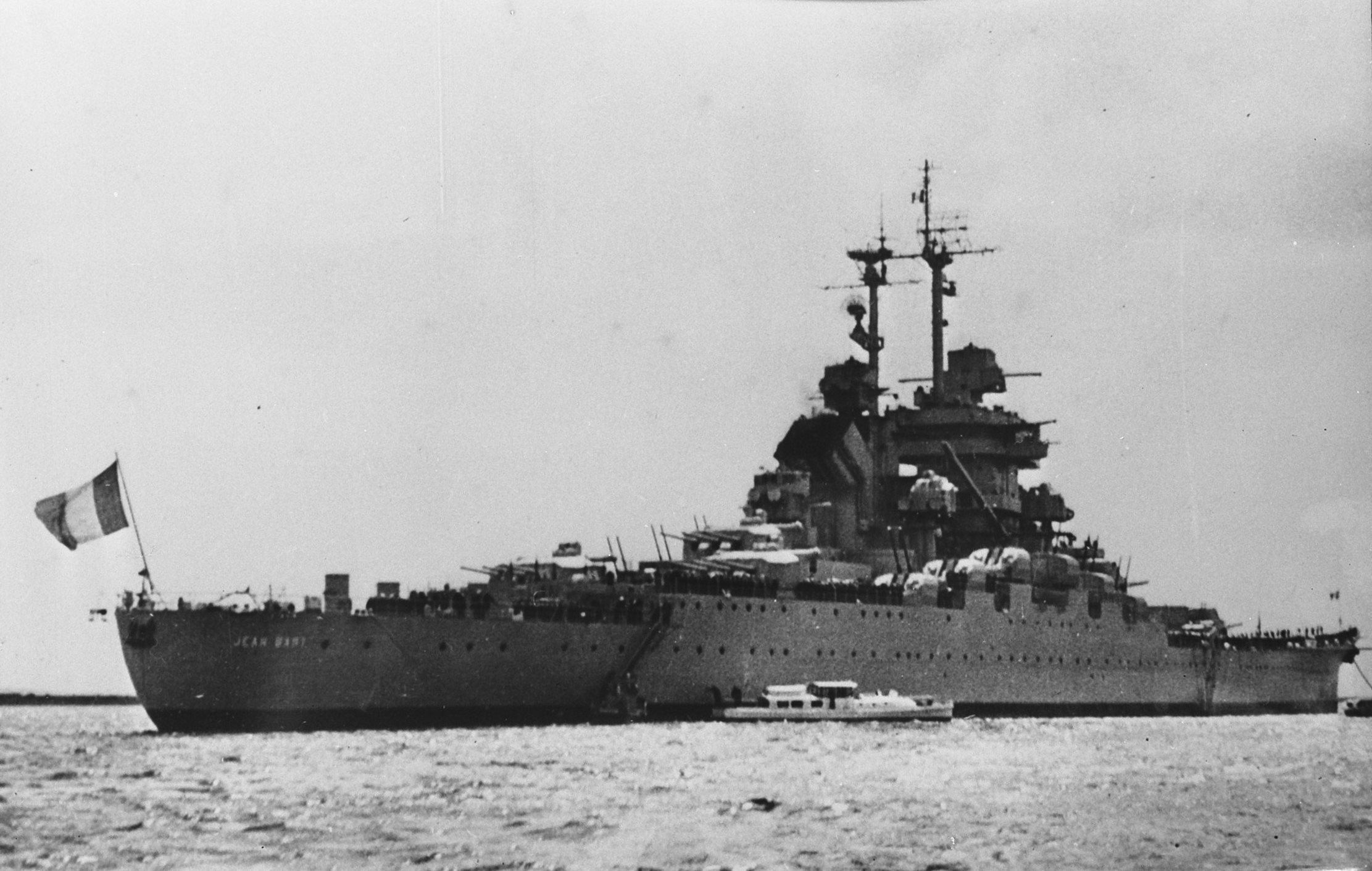
Jean Bart passing through the Suez Canal in 1956

Jean Bart participated in training exercises with the fleet off the coast of North Africa in May and June 1950. She spent the next several months in Brest, and in early 1951 resumed initial training. She went to Le Havre in May to have a degaussing system installed, followed by further training cruises and tests to determine fuel consumption in June. By 7 July, she had returned to the fitting-out quay in Brest for additional work. The ship's main and secondary batteries were by now operational, and her propulsion system was complete, though she still lacked her anti-aircraft battery and fire control equipment. Beginning in November the shipyard embarked on the next phase modernization program, which included the installation of the anti-aircraft guns, modifying the 152 mm turrets to convert them to dual-purpose guns, and the fitting of fire control equipment. The new anti-aircraft battery consisted of twenty-four 100 mm guns in twin mounts and twenty-eight Bofors 57 mm (2.2 in) guns. At the same time, her main battery turrets were deactivated for preservation while work continued on the ship.

Work on the ship's anti-aircraft battery proceeded very slowly. The 100 mm guns were installed by mid-1952, but the directors for them were not installed until May 1953, permitting test firings of the guns in July. The tests revealed the need for extensive modifications to the systems, that were finally completed in October 1954. The 57 mm guns were even more delayed, with the guns not ready for tests until September 1955, though their optical directors were not fitted until August 1956. The period of work between 1951 and 1956 was interrupted by numerous sea trials to evaluate the vessel as each new type of equipment was installed. By the time work on the ship was completed, she had been fitted with a variety of radar sets, including a DRBV 11 air/surface search radar, a DRBV 20 air search radar, and a DRBV 30 navigational radar. Fire control radars included a DRBC 10A set for the main battery, six ACAE sets for the heavy anti-aircraft battery and five DRBC 30B sets for the light anti-aircraft guns. Her normal displacement had risen to 43,052 t (42,372 long tons), with full-load displacement at 49,196 t (48,419 long tons). With the greater weight of the ship, draft increased to 10.9 m (36 ft).

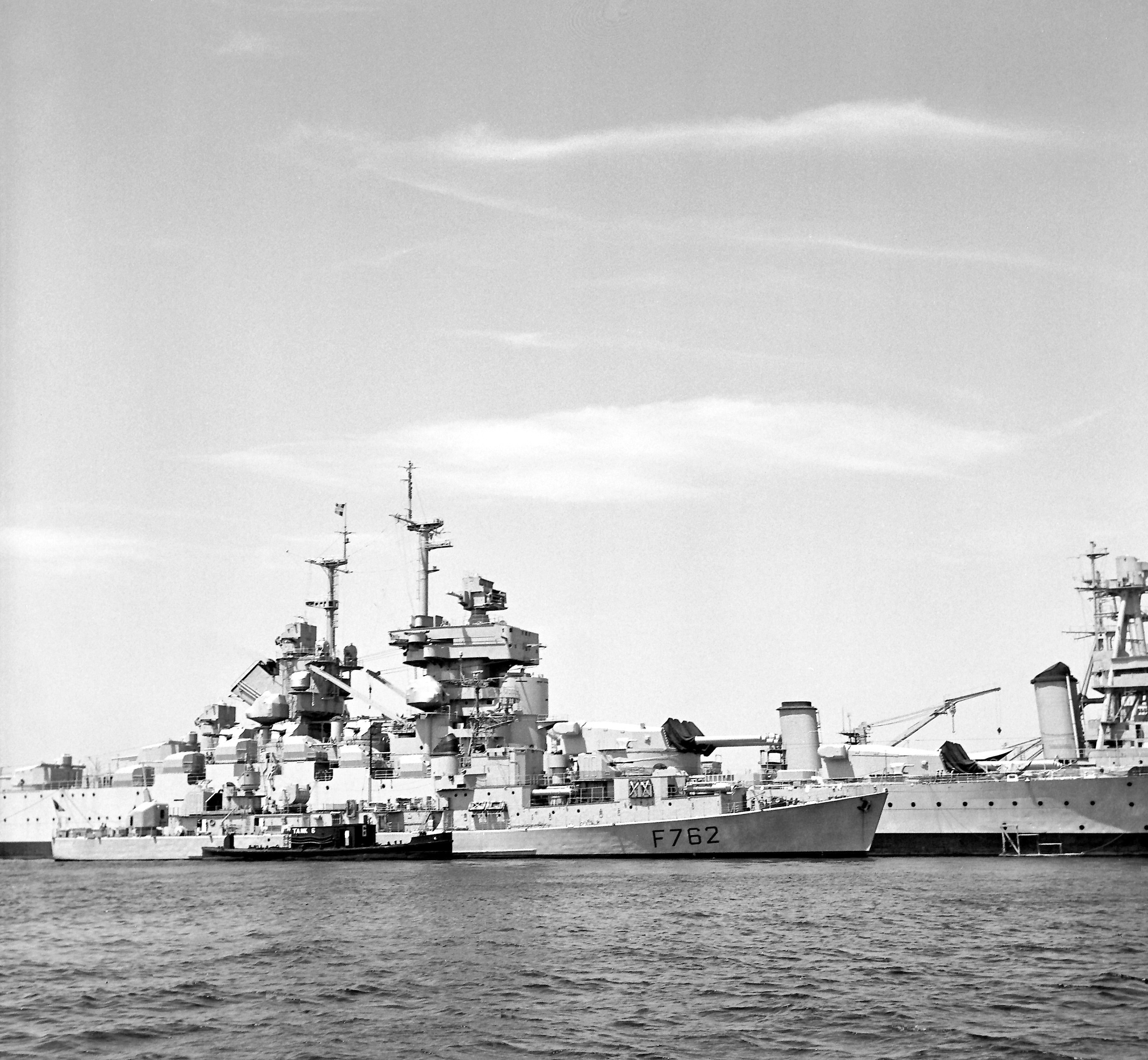
Jean Bart moored in Toulon in 1963

She was finally pronounced complete on 1 May 1955, and that month she embarked President René Coty for a visit to Denmark, escorted by the destroyer Surcouf. After returning from the cruise, which also included a visit to Oslo, Norway, she left in July to represent France at a celebration in New York of the 175th anniversary of the landing of French soldiers to assist the United States led by the Comte de Rochambeau during the American Revolutionary War. She thereafter conducted a series of training cruises off the coast of Brittany in August and September before transferring to the Mediterranean in October. She arrived in Toulon on 17 October, and four days later, Jean Bart replaced Richelieu as the flagship of the training squadron.

Jean Bart spent late 1955 and early 1956 in port and conducting gunnery training in Les Salins d'Hyères. For the first and last time of either of their careers, Richelieu and Jean Bart cruised together on 30 January 1956. In June 1956, Jean Bart went on a tour of French North Africa. As tensions with Egypt over the control of the Suez Canal flared in 1956, the decision was made on 8 July to deploy the ship to Egypt. Jean Bart's superfiring turret was reactivated in August and on 7 September, she conducted shooting practice with the turret in company with the cruiser Georges Leygues off the coast of North Africa.

She thereafter deployed with the French Naval Intervention Force during the Suez Crisis, Operation Mousquetaire, though with only her superfiring turret in operation. During the operations off the canal zone, she carried a complement of 1,280 officers and men, although her projected wartime crew amounted to 2,220. This meant that only half of her anti-aircraft guns could be manned. The ship departed Toulon on 26 October and steamed first to Algiers, French Algeria, where from 29 to 31 October, the 1st Foreign Parachute Regiment and Commando Hubert frogmen unit came aboard the ship. Jean Bart then joined the rest of the intervention force, which included the carriers Arromanches and La Fayette, Georges Leygues, the destroyers Surcouf, Kersaint, Cassard, and Bouvet, and an anti-submarine warfare group. The ships left on 1 November and reached Limassol, Cyprus on the 4th, where the paratroopers and frogmen transferred to amphibious assault ships. On 5 November, Jean Bart steamed south to bombard Port Said, but she fired only four rounds from her main battery before the landing was cancelled. She remained off the city for two more days before departing on the 7th and returning to Toulon by way of Limassol on 13 November.

On 1 December, Jean Bart returned to the training squadron. Her last period at sea took place from 11 to 19 July 1957; this was also the last time she fired her main battery. On 1 August, she was reduced to reserve status, despite the reluctance of many in the naval command to see the funds and effort expended in completing the ship be wasted. By this time, a new generation of post-war cruisers and destroyers were beginning to enter service, leading to significant crew shortages. Coupled with the cost of maintaining Jean Bart in service, the need to release the manpower tied up in the ship for more useful vessels led to her withdrawal from active service after just two years. The navy considered a number of modernization proposals to improve the ship's anti-aircraft battery or add guided missiles. The latter concept involved five different variants that ranged from adding missile launchers with 24–44 missiles to the quarterdeck to removing the main battery turrets and reconstructing the forward part of the ship to house a large missile battery with as many as 325 missiles. Alternatively, an air-defense missile armament for testing purposes was considered; this would have involved removing the centerline 152 mm turret and replacing it with a launcher for the American RIM-2 Terrier missile. The 152 mm turret would be retained for re-installation once the evaluation period was over.

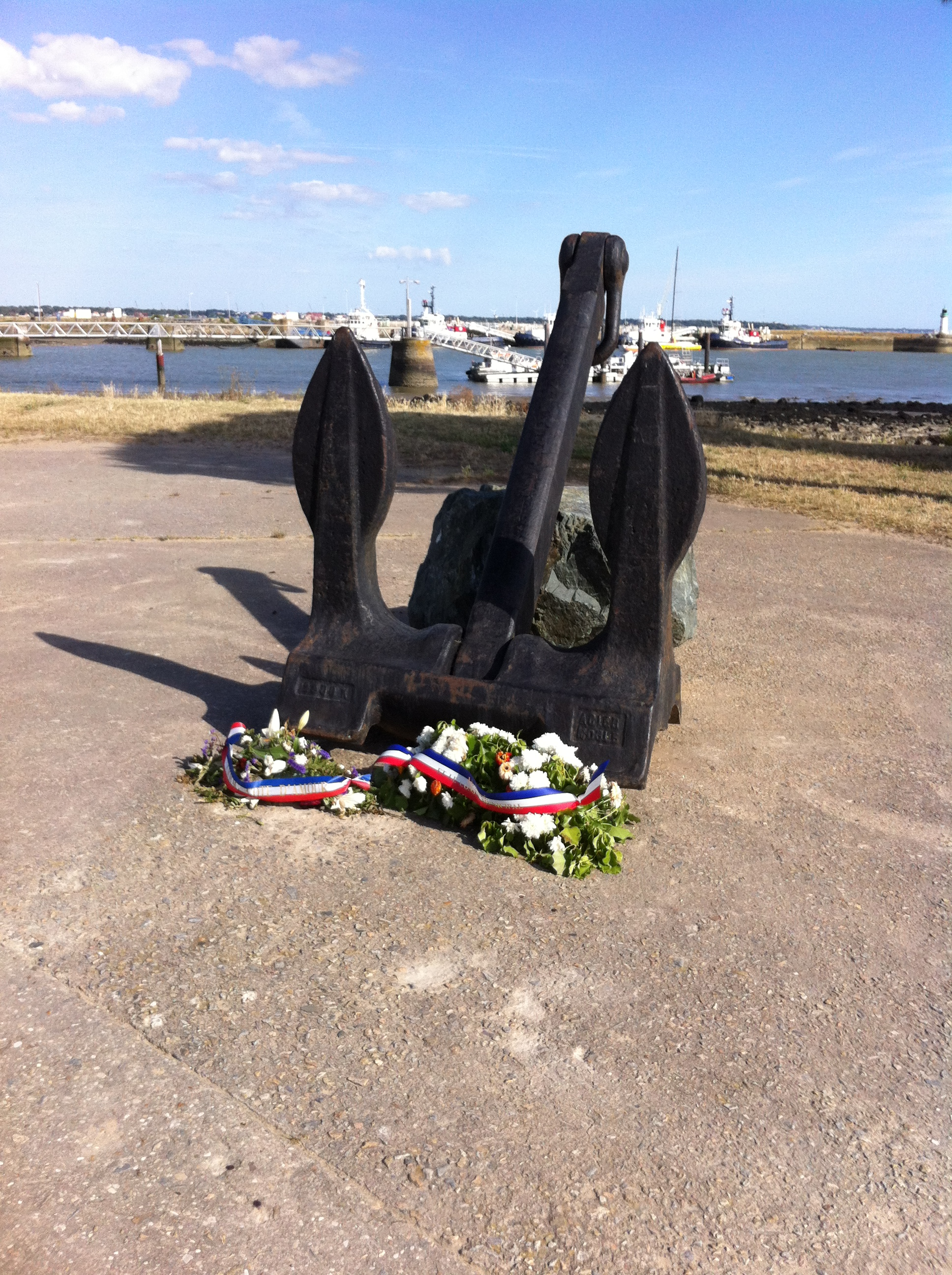
An anchor from Jean Bart on display in Saint Nazaire

None of the modernization or conversion projects came to fruition, and the missile batteries that involved removing the 380 mm turrets were not even seriously considered by the high command. In August 1957, the vessel was reduced to a barracks ship, and on 1 January 1961 her reserve status was downgraded. Some consideration was given in 1964 to reactivate the vessel for use as a command ship during a series of nuclear experiments in the Pacific Ocean, but it was determined that the cost would have been too high, and the cruiser De Grasse was used instead. The ship remained laid up until 10 February 1970 when she was struck from the naval register, renamed Q466, and placed for sale. The vessel was sold to ship breakers on 21 May, towed to Brégaillon, and dismantled for scrap. Though she never became fully operational, Jean Bart nevertheless proved to be a useful test bed for a variety of new French anti-aircraft guns and radars.
