= Haïm Vidal Séphiha =

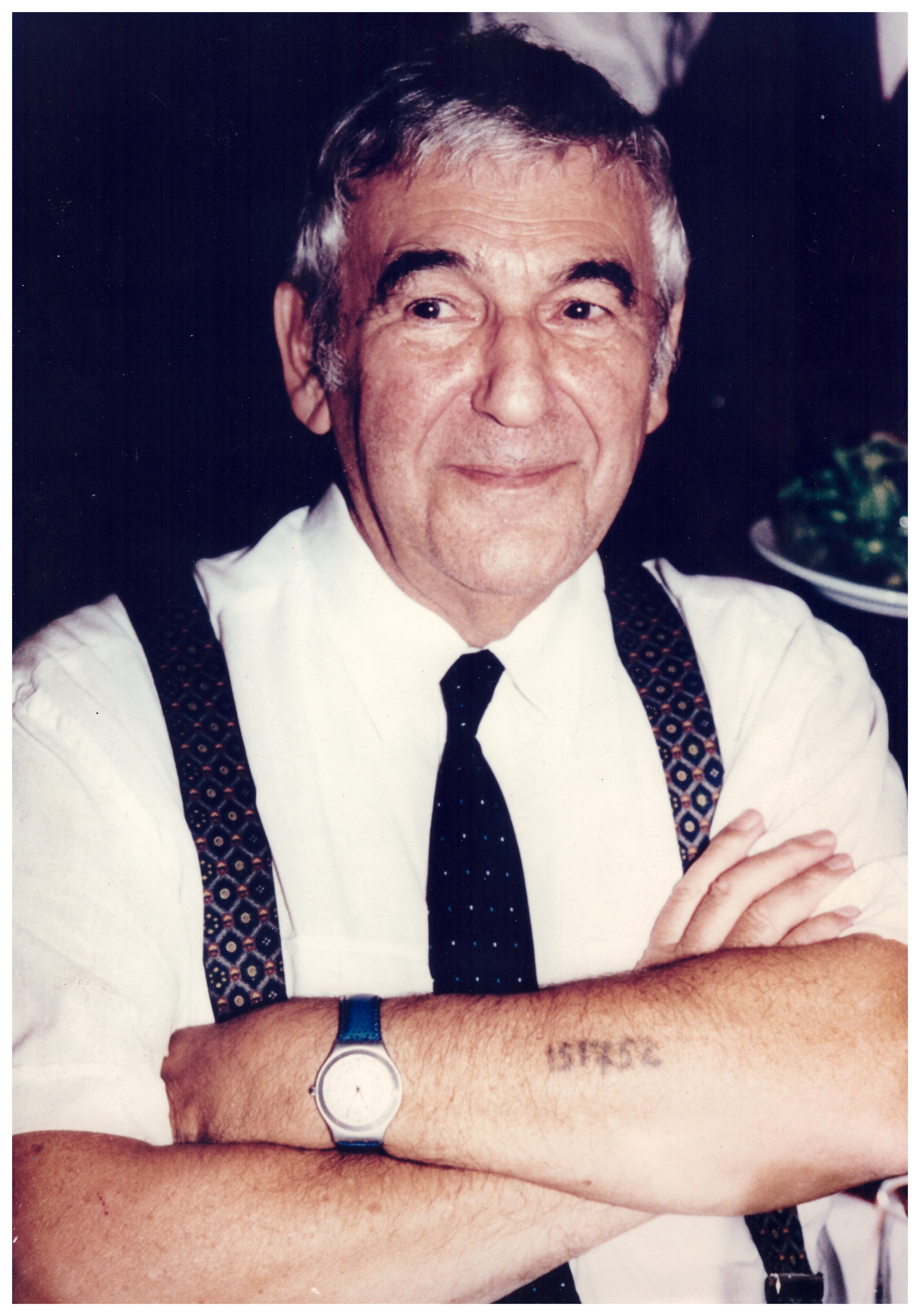
Séphiha in 1995

Haïm Vidal Séphiha (28 January 1923 – 17 December 2019) was a Belgian-French linguist and professor emeritus at several European universities, notably the Sorbonne. He was one of the first people to study Judaeo-Spanish, today spoken by a number of Sephardi Jews, and has contributed to the defense and promotion of the language's continued use.

== Biography ==
Séphiha was born in Brussels, Belgium to a family of Sephardic Jews from Istanbul. Due to jokes about his name, he added the Judeo-Spanish version of his name: Vidal. After obtaining Belgian citizenship through residency, Vidal began language study. He was arrested on 1 March 1943 and deported with other Belgian Jews to Auschwitz-Birkenau on 24 September 1943, returning to Belgium on 28 April 1945. His father was murdered at Dachau on 10 May 1945. Séphiha's mother and two sisters were deported to Ravensbrück. As Turkish citizens, the three women were transferred by the Nazis at the end of February 1945 from Ravensbrück to Moda, in Turkey, where they were kept under house arrest until the end of 1945, when they were returned to Belgium.

After the war, Séphiha began studying chemistry at université libre de Bruxelles, then moved to Rouen, France in 1948. The death of his mother in 1950 reignited his interest in his Sephardi roots. Séphiha resumed his studies in linguistics, Spanish literature and Portuguese literature at the Sorbonne in Paris, becoming a university professor in 1981. Séphiha became chair of linguistics in Judeo-Spanish, a position created for him in 1984 at the Sorbonne. Séphiha held that chair position until 1991, publishing dozens of books on the issues facing the Judeo-Spanish language advising over 400 student theses on the language. In 1979, Séphiha founded Vidas Largas, an organization founded to defend and promote Judeo-Spanish culture.

In 1977, Séphiha published one of his best-known works, L'Agonie des Judéo-Espagnols (The Agony of the Judeo-Spanish). The word agony in this context is meant to invoke the Greek meaning of the term (a struggle): Séphiha denied having announced the disappearance of the Judeo-Spanish language. That same year, Séphiha published two theses related to ladino, and how it is different to judesmo.

== Books and Honors ==
In 1989, Séphiha co-wrote a book with Edgar Morin and Véronique Grappe-Nahoum entitled Vidal et les siens.

In 1997, the University of Berlin dedicated a collection of his works, entitled Hommage à Haïm Vidal Séphiha.

In 2015, Séphiha looked back on his life and professional work in an interview book with his son Dominique Vidal, journalist for Le Monde diplomatique.

=== Books ===
- L'agonie des Judéo-Espagnols, Paris, éd. Entente, coll. « Minorités », 1977
- L'intensité en judéo-espagnol, Conseil Scientifique de l'UER d'études ibériques et latino-américaines, 1977
- Le ladino (judéo-espagnol calque) : structure et évolution d'une langue liturgique, Paris, éd. Vidas Largas, 1982
- Le judéo-espagnol, éd. Entente, coll. Langues en péril, Paris, 1986
- Vidal et les siens, avec Edgar Morin, Véronique Grappe-Nahoum, Le Seuil, Paris, 1989
- Contes judéo-espagnols, Du miel au fiel, éd. Bibliophane, Paris, 1991
- Sépharades d’hier et d’aujourd’hui (avec Richard Ayoun), éd. Liana Levi, 1992
- Ma vie pour le judéo-espagnol, La langue de ma mère (Entretien avec Dominique Vidal), éd. Le bord de l'eau, 2015

=== Articles ===
- « Le judéo-espagnol »
- « Littérature judéo-espagnole problématique »
- « Proverbes judéo-espagnols : la partie pour le tout : une mémoire sélective »
- « La cité perdue des séfarades », pour Le Monde diplomatique, juillet 1997
- Nuit et Brouillard pour Sepharad.org
- "Haïm-Vidal Sephiha - Grands Entretiens Patrimoniaux". Ina.fr.
