= Anne-Marcelle Kahn =

First French female engineer (1896–1965)

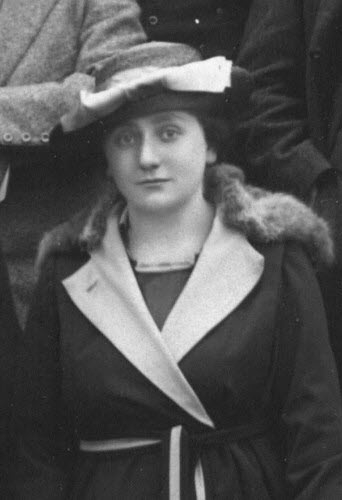
- Born: Anne-Marcelle Schrameck; 4 June 1896; Paris, France
- Died: 28 June 1965 (aged 69); Paris, France
- Education: EMSE
- Spouse: Louis Kahn
- Children: Two sons
- Father: Abraham Schrameck
- Engineering career
- Discipline: Mining engineering

Anne-Marcelle Kahn, née Schrameck (4 June 1896 – 28 June 1965) was the first French woman engineer to graduate from l'École nationale supérieure des mines de Saint-Étienne (the National School of Mines of Saint-Étienne), in 1919. She later married Louis Kahn, who became the first Jewish French Admiral. During the Second World War, unaided she crossed the Pyrenees with her two young children, bringing them to safety.

== Early life ==
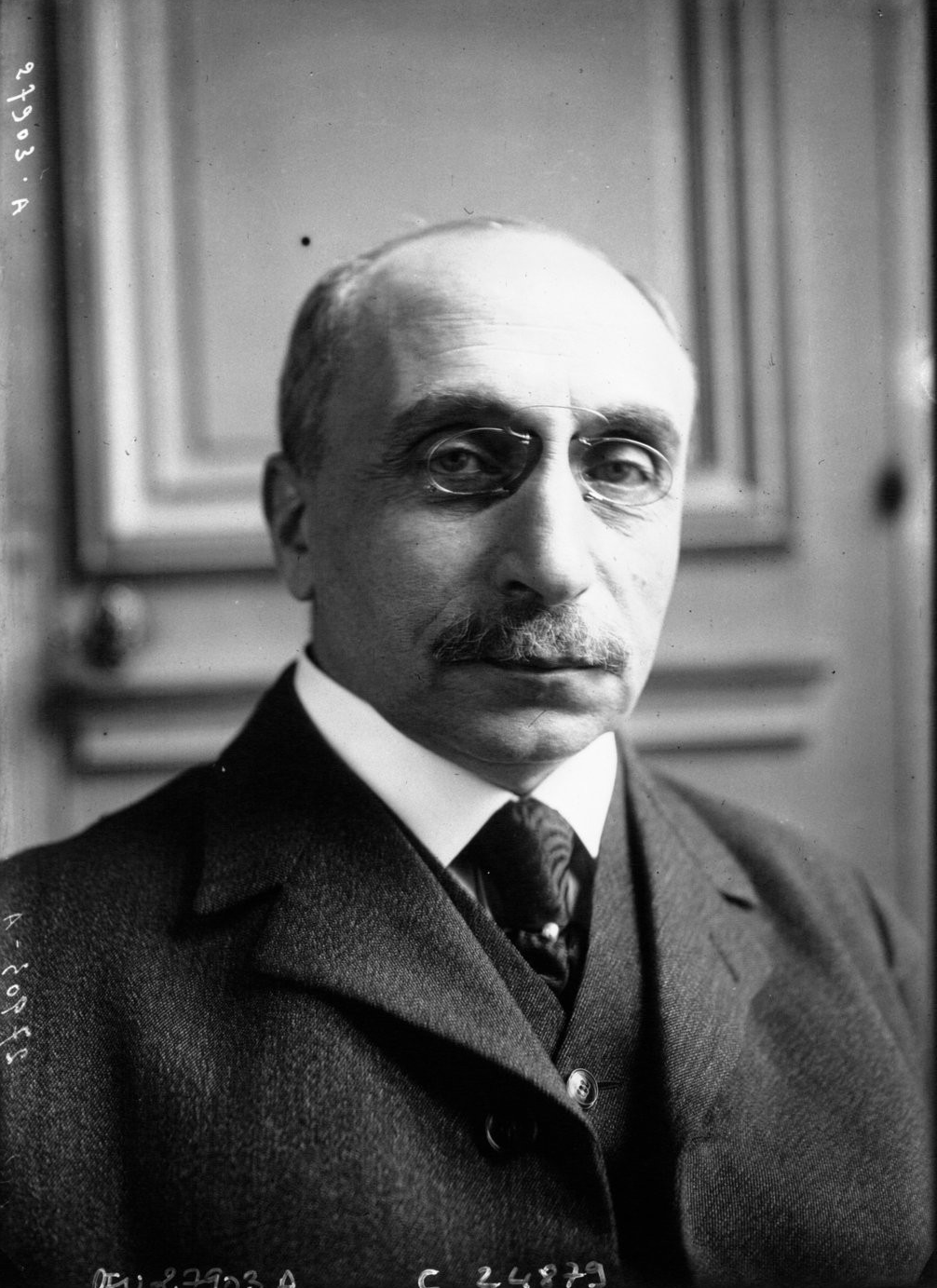
Abraham Schrameck, Anne-Marcell's father, when he was Ministre de l'Intérieur

Anne-Marcelle Schrameck was born on 4 June 1896 in the 7th arrondissement of Paris. She was the daughter of Marguerite Odile Bernheim and Abraham Schrameck, who was a French Minister of the Interior in the Third Republic. She had two younger brothers. The family were Jewish.

== Education ==
In 1912, Schrameck entered a lyceum. In 1917, she attempted to apply to study mining engineering at l'École nationale supérieure des mines de Saint-Étienne (EMSE). The grande ecole was deeply reluctant to admit her, despite receiving two letters from the Ministry of Public Works, which insisted that during World War I, young women should be admitted to train in engineering due to the wartime shortages. The management committee attempted to argue that "that the main career paths to which the School’s courses lead, notably that of underground mining engineer or metallurgical engineer, are virtually inaccessible to women" and that whilst they could "conceive of a woman being of use as an engineer in certain ancillary services, such as electrical services in mines or laboratory work in metallurgy", the EMSE's courses were less likely to lead to such ancillary careers than courses at other schools already open to women. Georges Desplas, the Minister for Public Works, insisted that EMSE should admit women and eventually the grande ecole agreed to let Schrameck sit the entry examination.

Schrameck passed the examination and studied at EMSE between 1917 and 1919. She earned the diplôme d'ingénieur civil des mines (diploma of civil engineer of mines), graduating as part of the Promotion of 1919, becoming the first woman engineering graduate from a grande ecole.

Following her admission, there was significant debate over the suitability of a woman taking the course as pupils had to undertake an internship as a miner, considered inappropriate for a woman. The school's regulations were subsequently amended to prohibit the admission of women, a situation which lasted for 50 years (until 1968), and during that time no other woman was admitted as an engineering student in a French mining school.

== Career ==
In 1920, Anne-Marcelle Schrameck worked for a time in the Kuhlmann chemical factories in Lorraine. In March 1922, she wrote an article for the literary magazine La Nouvelle Revue on "Le problème du travail en Amérique", which was optimistic about "groups with common and vital interests" helping "to secure peace amongst mankind".

== Marriage to Louis Kahn ==
On 11 July 1922, Anne-Marcelle Schrameck married Louis Kahn, a marine engineer, at the Synagogue de la Victoire in Paris. The couple lived in Brest, then Saïgon then Lorient and had two sons, Pierre (1926–1997) and Jean (1931–2017). Between 1927 and 1929 she was a member of Shakespeare and Company, an English language bookshop in Paris run by Sylvia Beach.

== Second World War ==
In July 1940 her father, Abraham Schrameck, voted in parliament in favour of giving full powers to Marshal Pétain at the start of the Vichy Republic but despite this support he was stripped of his senatorial position by Pétain on 27 November 1941 and was soon arrested and interned because of his Jewish origins. Managing to reach Provence, he remained hidden there until the Libération.

On 15 August 1941 Louis Kahn was sacked from the Navy following the introduction of antisemitic laws preventing Jews holding state offices.

The family fled separately to escape any further reprisals. After two escape attempts, Louis Kahn managed to reach London alone. He joined the Free French Naval Forces (FNFL) with the rank of chief engineer. With the Minister of the Navy Louis Jacquinot and Vice-Admiral André Lemonnier, he became one of the leaders of the renewal of the Free French Naval Forces based in Algiers, following its conquest by Allied forces following Operation Torch in November 1942. He held the post of director of naval constructions from 1943.

=== Marseille ===
Anne-Marcelle Kahn left for the relative safety of Marseille in the French-administered Zone Libre with her two young sons, Pierre and Jean, and her father on 18 June 1940. In November 1942, the Germans invaded the free zone. On 24 December 1942, a bomb was placed in one of the large hotels in Marseille. The wife of the German consul lost both legs in the explosion, and died a few days later. The reprisals began with arrests and deportations.

Marseille had become a dangerous place as the Germans destroyed the district of the Old Port of Marseille, and instituted the Marseille roundup (22 – 24 January 1943) in collaboration with the French police of the Vichy government, directed by René Bousquet. The police checked the identity documents of 40,000 people and arrested and deported over 2000 Jewish people.

Anne-Marcelle Kahn decided to leave Marseille when a 16-year-old friend of her son was arrested and deported by the Germans. She and the children often slept in friends' houses for safety whilst she tried to get papers in another name to protect them. The Resistance took her in, gave her good accommodation, and fed her for eight days whilst new identity cards were created for her and the children.

=== Grenoble ===
She and her sons travelled into the Alps, near Grenoble, and the children stayed in a boarding house for safety. The Resistance provided her with false identity cards.

Anne-Marcelle Kahn received a message from her husband, Je suis arrivé (I have arrived) but the message from England took a long time to reach her. Kahn had sent it in the expectation that the family would join him in Britain.

=== Crossing the Pyrenees ===
Anne-Marcelle Kahn looked for the guides who had helped her husband across the Pyrenees, so that they could escape from France, but they had mostly been arrested. When she found other smugglers, they were not willing to guide young children across the Pyrenees as they thought her youngest son Jean, at only 10 years old, would not be able to make it. The elder son, Pierre, was 15.

She decided to make the journey with her two children, unaided, in October 1943, using a Scouting compass and Carte d'état-major general maps of France.

The family crossed the Pyrenees from Perpignan alone in two days. They took nothing with them, hoping to pass themselves off as tourists. They took nine days to travel from Perpignan to finally reach Casablanca, in Morocco, including spending three days in prison in Spain after being arrested in Barcelona.

=== Casablanca, then Algiers ===
Anne-Marcelle Kahn and her two sons arrived in Casablanca on 22 October 1943, having learned that Louis Kahn was alive and in Algiers from a man they met on the ship, having had no news for eight months. They moved on to join him in Algiers, and then left on 17 October 1944, to return to Paris, where the family settled.

She later recounted her experiences and journeys during the Second World War in an interview with David P. Boder in 1946.

== Death and legacy ==
Anne-Marcelle Kahn died on 28 June 1965, in the 14th arrondissement of Paris, at the age of 69.

In 2026, Kahn, under her maiden name Schrameck, was announced as one of 72 historical women in STEM whose names have been proposed to be added to the 72 men already celebrated on the Eiffel Tower. The plan was announced by the Mayor of Paris, Anne Hidalgo following the recommendations of a committee led by Isabelle Vauglin of Femmes et Sciences and Jean-François Martins, representing the operating company which runs the Eiffel Tower.
