= Louis Kahn (admiral) =

French Jewish Admiral

Louis-Lazare Kahn (1895–1967, Paris), known as Admiral Louis Kahn, was the first French Jewish Admiral, and a leader of the French Jewish community.

== Biography ==
Louis Kahn was born in 1895 and received a degree in marine engineering from the École Polytechnique in 1914. During World War II, he escaped from France via Spain, headed for London, then to Algiers, the shipbuilding center of the Free French Naval Forces (French: Forces navales françaises libres).

With the Secretary of the Navy (Ministre de la Marine) Louis Jacquinot and the Vice-Admiral André Lemonnier, Engineer General Louis Kahn was one of the project managers of the revival of the Navy from Algiers.

Roger Peyrefitte thus described Admiral Kahn's role:

"London and Jean Pierre-Bloch make me think of another Jew who went to join the Free French Forces: the Engineer General, Admiral Kahn. He had perfected a means of protecting shipping against torpedoes, and wished to submit the invention to Churchill. He apparently wished to impose a condition, however, which was the recognition of de Gaulle's government by England, which till then had only approved it. He declined the most attractive offers for his invention, but was finally persuaded by de Gaulle himself to relinquish his patent without stipulation. This story reminds one of Chaim Weizmann, who in 1914, delivered his discovery of acetone to England only on the understanding that a Jewish national home should be established in Palestine. It's only fair that he should have been the first President of the State of Israel. Confidentially though, I prefer the adventure of Admiral Kahn, who only became President of the Consistory."

He was president of the Marine Academy (l'Académie de marine) from 1959 to 1961.

He was president of the Consistoire Central des juifs de France (1963–1967). He was also president-delegate of the Alliance Israélite Universelle and vice-president of the ORT.

Admiral Kahn was close to rabbi David Feuerwerker. The latter officiated at the wedding of the son of the president of the Consistoire Central in the Synagogue Chasseloup-Laubat, in the 15th arrondissement of Paris.

== Personal life ==
Louis Kahn married Anne-Marcelle Schrameck (1896–1965), daughter of politician Abraham Schrameck on 11 July 1922, at the synagogue de la Victoire in Paris. In 1919 she had been the first woman engineer to graduate from the École nationale supérieure des mines de Saint-Étienne (the National School of Mines of Saint-Étienne). The couple lived in Brest, then Saigon then Lorient and had two sons, Pierre (1926–1997) and Jean (1931–2017).

== Death and commemoration ==
Admiral Kahn was buried at Versailles's Jewish cemetery. The funeral was led by Jacob Kaplan', France's Chief Rabbi. Note that both, Kahn and Kaplan, were Kohanim.

In 1968, the writer Arnold Mandel gave the following description of Admiral Kahn:

"Louis Kahn, a high-ranking naval engineer, died in Paris in February, at the age of 72. A technician of exceptional competence, he had rendered great service to de Gaulle's Free French Committee in London during World War II. He played a major role in the French Jewish community. As president of the Central Consistory, he widened the scope and contacts of that old institution of French Jewry, so long petrified in social conservatism. He was a religious man and a practicing Jew. Called "Admiral Kahn" by everyone (he had the civil equivalent of that rank), he extended his activity and influence far beyond consistorial circles. He often spoke in his personal capacity in defense of nonconformist views. He made numerous trips to Israel. In 1963 he headed the French delegation to the "Days of French Judaism" in Tel Aviv. He was given a state funeral with a guard of honor in the court of honor of the Hôtel des Invalides in Paris."

On July 18, 2010, in a speech, the French Secretary of State for development of the territory, Hubert Falco, paid homage to him.

== Bibliography ==
- Pierre Kahn. Essai sur les méthodes de pensée et d'action de l'ingénieur général du Génie maritime Louis Kahn. Académie de marine: Paris, 1973
- Richard Ayoun.Un grand homme de la communauté juive de Versailles: l'ingénieur général du génie maritime Louis Kahn (1895–1967). Centenaire de la synagogue de Versailles, Versailles, septembre 1986, p. 33-36.
- Susan Zuccotti. The Holocaust, the French, and the Jews. University of Nebraska Press, 1999. ISBN 0-8032-9914-1, ISBN 978-0-8032-9914-6

== See also ==
- Consistory (Judaism)
