= Abraham Schrameck =

French politician (1867–1948)

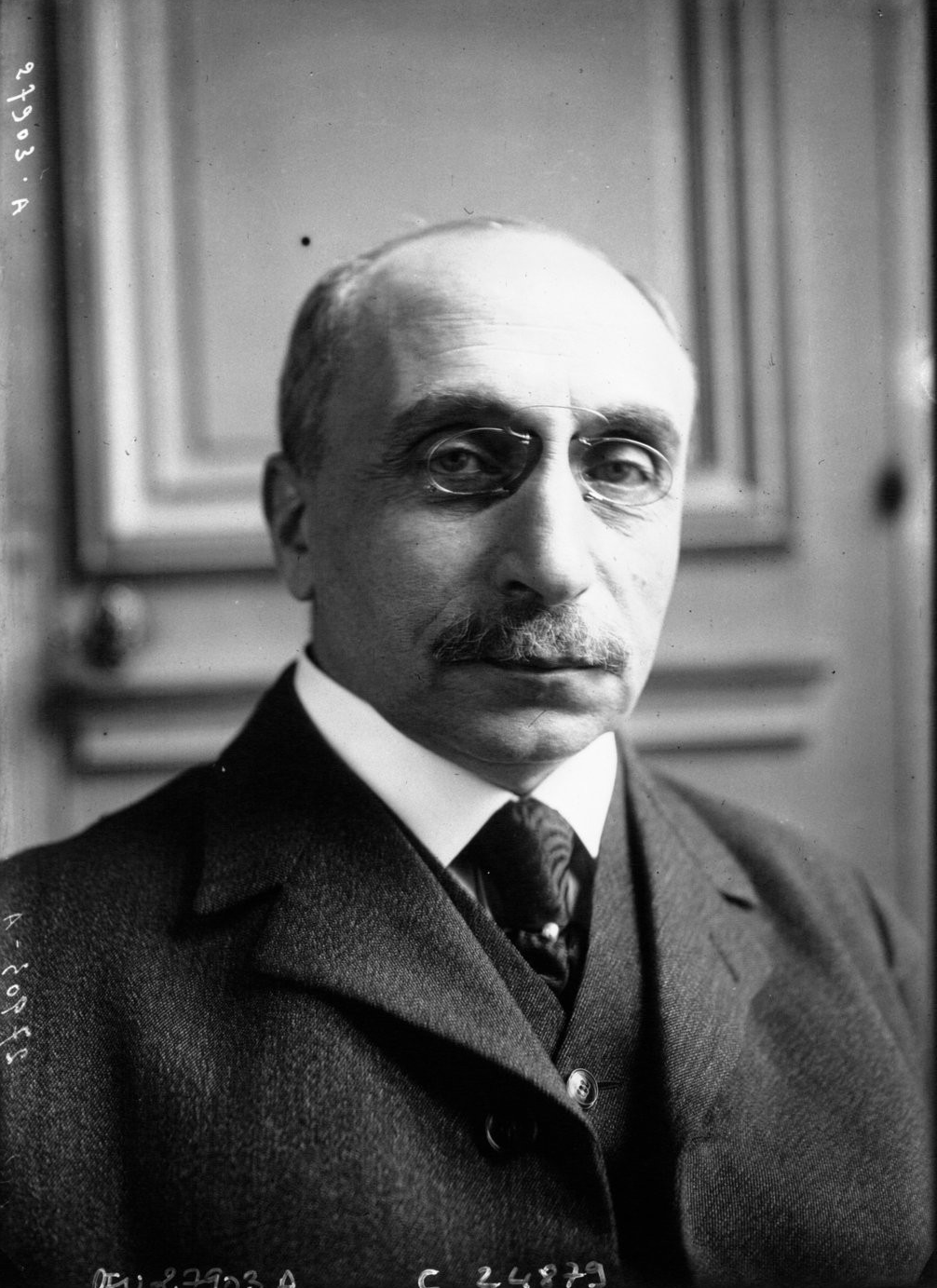
- A photograph of Schrameck from 1925.

9th Governor-General of Madagascar
- In office 1 August 1918 – 12 July 1919
- Preceded by: Martial Henri Merlin
- Succeeded by: Marie Casimir Joseph Guyon

Minister of the Interior (France)
- In office 17 April 1925 – 22 November 1925
- Preceded by: Camille Chautemps
- Succeeded by: Camille Chautemps

Personal details
- Born: 26 November 1867 Saint-Etienne
- Died: 19 October 1948 (aged 80) Marseille

Abraham Schrameck (26 November 1867 – 19 October 1948) was a French-Jewish politician, senator, Minister of the Interior, and colonial governor of French Madagascar.

== Early life ==
Schrameck was born to a family of Jewish merchants on 26 November 1867.

== Career ==
From 1925 to 1945, he was the Senator for Bouches-du-Rhone, and also served as Minister of the interior for seven months in 1925.

=== Interior minister ===
In 1925, amid clashes between monarchists and communists, Schrameck ordered the prohibition of May Day and the Joan of Arc parade. The monarchists, led by the Action Française movement, ignored his order and continued to hold celebrations.

During his career, he was subject to antisemitic harassment from the far-right, including Charles Maurras and Action Francaise.

=== Vichy regime ===
While he initially voted in 1940 for "full powers" to be given to Vichy ruler Philippe Petain, this did not prevent him from being first placed under house arrest and then sentenced to internment a year later due to his Jewish background.

== Personal life ==
Abraham Schrameck married Marguerite Odile Bernheim (1872–1945) on 18 April 1895. The couple had three children, a daughter Anne-Marcelle and two sons, Etienne (1897-1919) and Georges Emile (1898-1935). Anne-Marcelle Kahn was the first, and for 50 years the only woman to graduate as an engineer from l'École nationale supérieure des mines de Saint-Étienne. She went on to marry Louis-Lazare Kahn (1895–1967), known as Admiral Louis Kahn, the first French Jewish Admiral.

== Books ==
- Code pénitentiaire : recueil des actes et documents officiels intéressant les services et les établissements pénitentiaires
- Inauguration du monument élevé à la mémoire du général Galliéni à Tamatave, le 4 octobre 1918 : discours

== See also ==
- List of Jewish heads of state and government
