= Cruiser Act =

The Cruiser Act is a United States federal law passed by the U.S. Congress on February 13, 1929. The Senate passed the act by a margin of 68-12 and it was signed by president Calvin Coolidge on 15 February.
