= Richard Ayoun =

French historian (1948–2008)

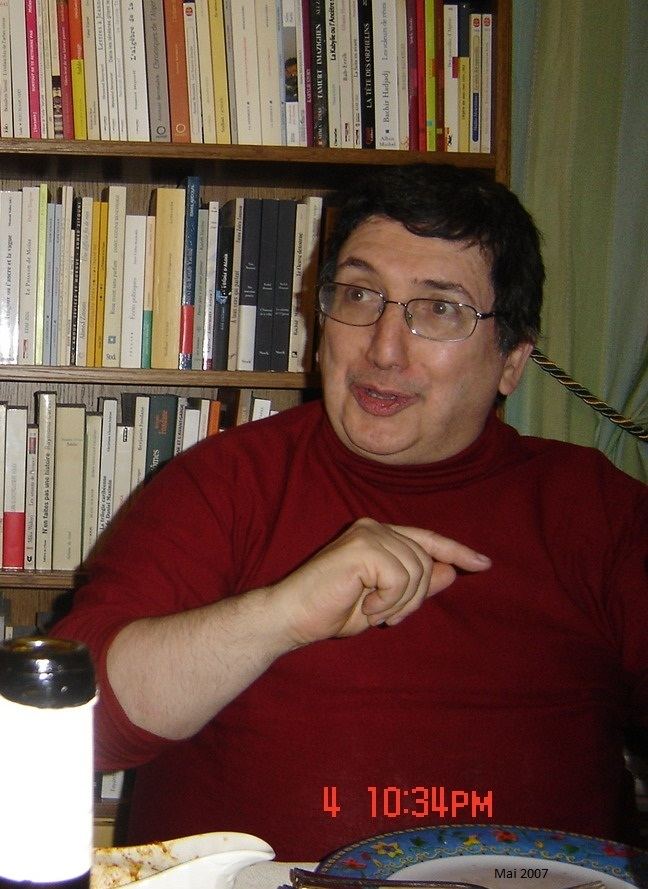
- Born: 23 January 1948; Algeria
- Died: 30 May 2008 (aged 60); Paris, France
- Occupation: Historian

Richard Ayoun (born 23 January 1948 in Algeria, died on 30 May 2008 in Paris, France) was a professor at University of Paris, Institut National des Langues et Civilisations Orientales (INALCO), Jewish historian and lecturer in Sephardic language and civilization.

== Works consulted ==
- Typologie d’une carrière rabbinique L’example de Mahir Charleville, in Presses Universitaires de Nancy, 1993, 2 vol., 1004 p.
- Les Juifs de France de l’émancipation à l’intégration (1787–1812), in L’Harmattan, coll. « Judaïsmes », 1997, 320 p.
- Un Grand rabbin au XIXe siècle : Mahir Charleville 1814–1888, in Cerf, 1999, 545 p.
- The Judeo-Spanish people : Itineraries of a community, Paris, in JEAA, March 2003, 82 p.
