= French aviso D'Iberville =

French Navy warship

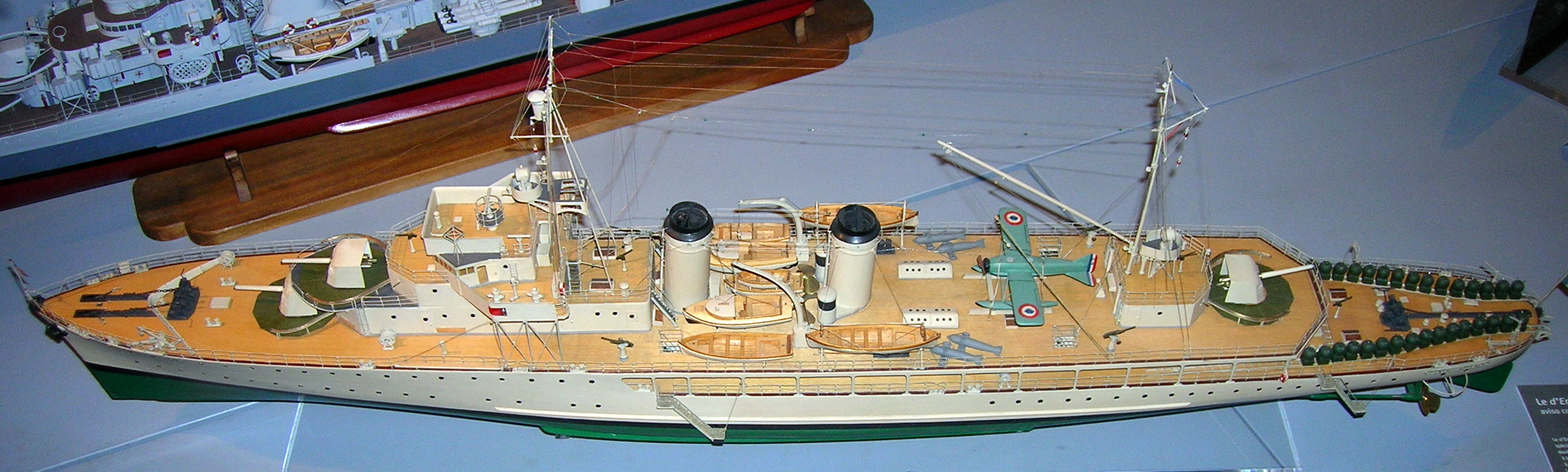
- Model of sister D'Entrecasteaux at Musée de la Marine de Paris

History

France
- Name: D'Iberville
- Namesake: Pierre Le Moyne d'Iberville
- Builder: At. & Ch. Maritime Sud-Ouest, Bordeaux
- Launched: 23 September 1934
- Fate: Scuttled at Toulon, 27 November 1942

General characteristics
- Type: Bougainville-class aviso
- Displacement: 1,969 t (1,938 long tons) (standard); 2,600 t (2,600 long tons) (full load)
- Length: 103.7 m (340 ft 3 in) (o/a)
- Beam: 12.7 m (41 ft 8 in)
- Draught: 4.15 m (13 ft 7 in)
- Installed power: 2,100 PS (1,500 kW; 2,100 bhp)
- Propulsion: 2 shafts; 2 diesel engines
- Speed: 15.5 knots (28.7 km/h; 17.8 mph)
- Range: 9,000 nmi (17,000 km; 10,000 mi) at 14 knots (26 km/h; 16 mph)
- Complement: 14 officers and 121 crewmen in peacetime; 166 or 183 men in wartime
- Armament: 3 × single 138.6 mm (5.5 in) guns; 4 × single 37 mm (1.5 in) AA guns; 3 × twin 13.2 mm (0.52 in) machine guns; 50 × mines
- Armour: Hull: 5–6 mm (0.20–0.24 in); Deck: 5–6 mm (0.20–0.24 in); Gun shields: 3 mm (0.1 in)
- Aircraft carried: 1 × Gourdou-Leseurre GL-832 HY floatplane

D′Iberville was one of a dozen Bougainville-class avisos built for the French Navy during the 1930s. The ships were designed to operate from French colonies in Asia and Africa. Completed in 1935, D′Iberville served with the navy of Vichy France after France surrendered to Germany in June 1940 during World War II. She was scuttled with other ships of the French fleet at Toulon, France, in November 1942.

== Design and description ==
The Bougainville-class avisos were intended for service in the French colonial empire in austere conditions. They had an overall length of 103.7 metres (340 ft 3 in), a beam of 12.7 metres (41 ft 8 in), and a draught of 4.15 metres (13 ft 7 in). The ships displaced 1,969 tonnes (1,938 long tons) at standard load and 2,600 tonnes (2,600 long tons) at deep load. The superstructure, decks, and the upper plating of the hull was made from armor-steel plates 5–6 millimetres (0.20–0.24 in) thick to better resist small arms and machine gun bullets. Their crew consisted of 14 officers and 121 ratings in peacetime.

The Bougainville class was powered by a pair of license-built six-cylinder diesel engines, each driving one propeller shaft. D'Iberville had Sulzer two-stroke engines rated at a total of 4,200 metric horsepower (3,089 kW; 4,143 bhp) for a designed speed of 15.5 knots (28.7 km/h; 17.8 mph). The ships carried enough diesel fuel to give them a range of 9,000 nautical miles (17,000 km; 10,000 mi) at 14 knots (26 km/h; 16 mph).

The Bougainville-class ships were armed with three Canon de 138.6-millimetre (5.46 in) Mle 1927 guns in single mounts, one superfiring pair forward of the superstructure and the third gun atop the aft superstructure. They were protected by 3 mm-thick (0.12 in) gun shields. The ships were fitted with a 3-metre (9 ft 10 in) Mle 1932 coincidence rangefinder on the roof of the bridge that fed data to the type aviso mechanical fire-control computer. The anti-aircraft armament of the Bougainville class consisted of four 50-caliber Canon de 37 mm (1.5 in) Mle 1925 AA guns in single mounts. Short-range protection against strafing aircraft was provided by eight Mitrailleuse de 8 mm (0.3 in) Mle 1914 in four twin mountings. The ships were fitted with mine rails, one set on each side of the aft superstructure to allow them to lay defensive minefields. They could carry 50 Breguet B4 mines or a smaller number of larger Harlé H4 mines. They were also fitted with four minesweeping paravanes on the quarterdeck. The minerails could also be used to drop depth charges over the stern via trolleys; a total of 16 depth charges could be loaded on the rails.

Between the mainmast and the aft funnel, space was reserved for a reconnaissance seaplane, either a Gourdou-Leseurre GL-832 HY floatplane or a Potez 452 flying boat. The aircraft was lifted onto the water and recovered back on board by a derrick attached to the mainmast.

== Bibliography ==
- Jordan, John (2016). "The Colonial Sloops of the Bougainville Class". Warship 2016. London: Conway. pp. 8–29. ISBN 978-1-84486-326-6.
- Landais, Henri (2012). Les Avisos Coloniaux de 2000 tW (1930–1960) [The 2000-ton Colonial Avisos] (in French). Outreau, France: Lela Presse. ISBN 978-2-914017-64-0.
- Le Masson, Henri (1969). The French Navy. Navies of the Second World War. Vol. 2. London: MacDonald & Co. ISBN 0-356-02385-0.
- Morareau, Lucien (November–December 2011). "Les hydravions des avisos coloniaux: Première partie". Avions (in French). pp. 2–24.
- Roberts, John (1980). "France". In Chesneau, Roger (ed.). Conway's All the World's Fighting Ships 1922–1946. New York: Mayflower Books. pp. 255–279. ISBN 0-8317-0303-2.
- Rohwer, Jürgen (2005). Chronology of the War at Sea 1939–1945: The Naval History of World War Two (Third Revised ed.). Annapolis, Maryland: Naval Institute Press. ISBN 1-59114-119-2.
