= French aviso Rigault de Genouilly =

Rigault de Genouilly
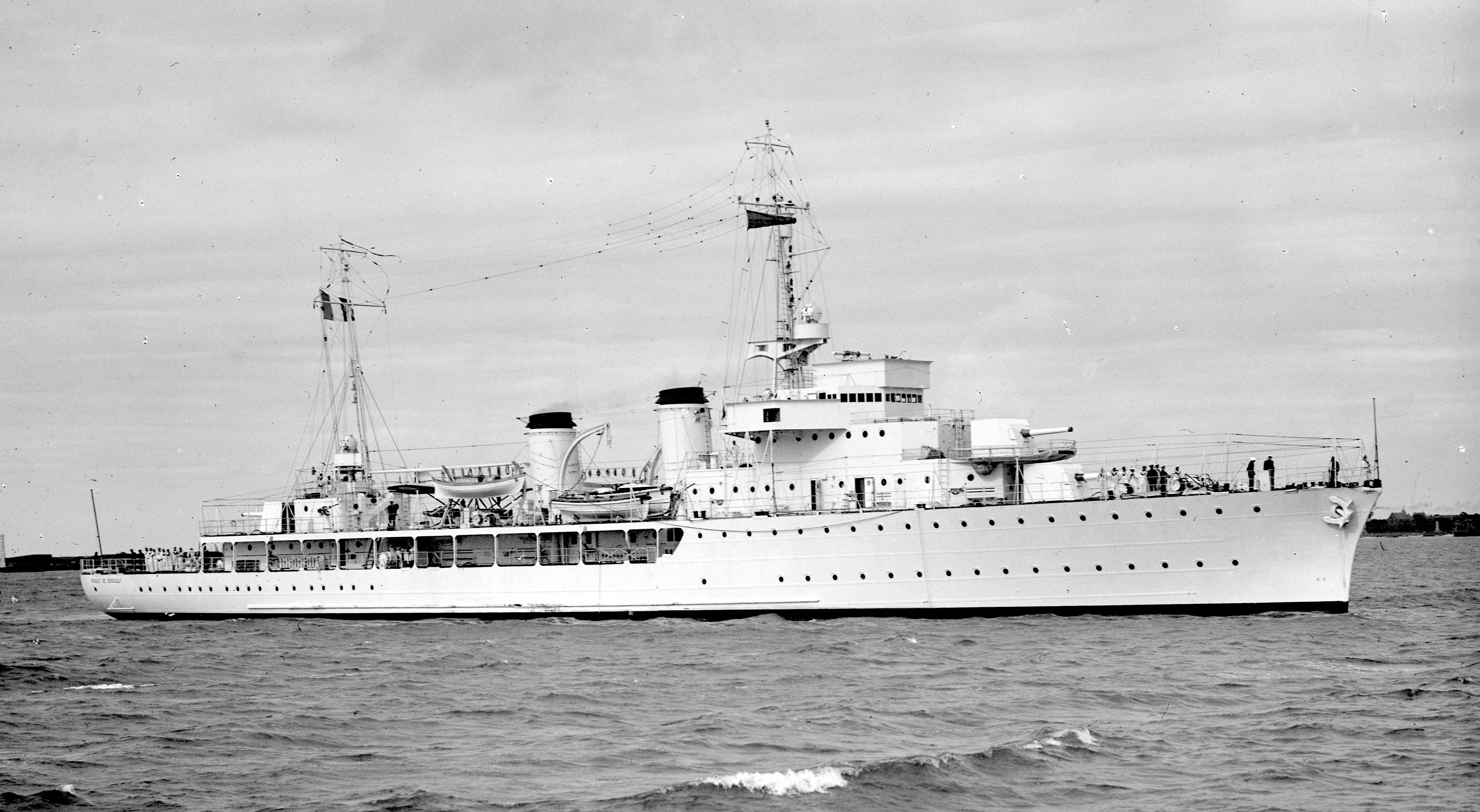
- Rigault de Genouilly in 1938

History

France
- Name: Rigault de Genouilly
- Namesake: Charles Rigault de Genouilly (1807–1873), French admiral
- Builder: Forges et Chantiers de la Gironde, Lormont, France
- Laid down: 7 July 1931
- Launched: 18 September 1932
- Commissioned: 14 March 1934
- Fate: Sunk 4 July 1940

General characteristics
- Type: Bougainville-class aviso
- Displacement: 1,969 t (1,938 long tons) (standard); 2,600 t (2,559 long tons) (full load)
- Length: 103.7 m (340 ft 3 in) (o/a)
- Beam: 12.7 m (41 ft 8 in)
- Draught: 4.15 m (13 ft 7 in)
- Installed power: 2,191 PS (1,611 kW; 2,161 bhp)
- Propulsion: 2 diesel engines, 2 shafts;
- Speed: 15.5 knots (28.7 km/h; 17.8 mph)
- Range: 9,000 nmi (16,700 km; 10,400 mi) at 14 knots (26 km/h; 16 mph)
- Complement: 14 officers and 121 men in peacetime; 166 or 183 men in wartime
- Armament: 3 × 138.6 mm (5.5 in) guns; 4 × 37 mm (1.5 in) AA guns; 3 × twin 13.2 mm (0.52 in) machine guns; 50 × mines
- Armour: Hull: 5–6 mm (0.20–0.24 in); Deck: 5–6 mm (0.20–0.24 in); Gun shields: 3 mm (0.1 in)
- Aircraft carried: 1 × Gourdou-Leseurre GL-832 HY floatplane

Rigault de Genouilly (PG-80) was one of a dozen Bougainville-class avisos built for the French Navy during the 1930s. The ships were designed to operate from French colonies in Asia and Africa. During World War II, Rigault de Genouilly served on the side of the Allies until June 1940, and then in the naval forces of Vichy France. She was sunk in July 1940.

== Design and description ==
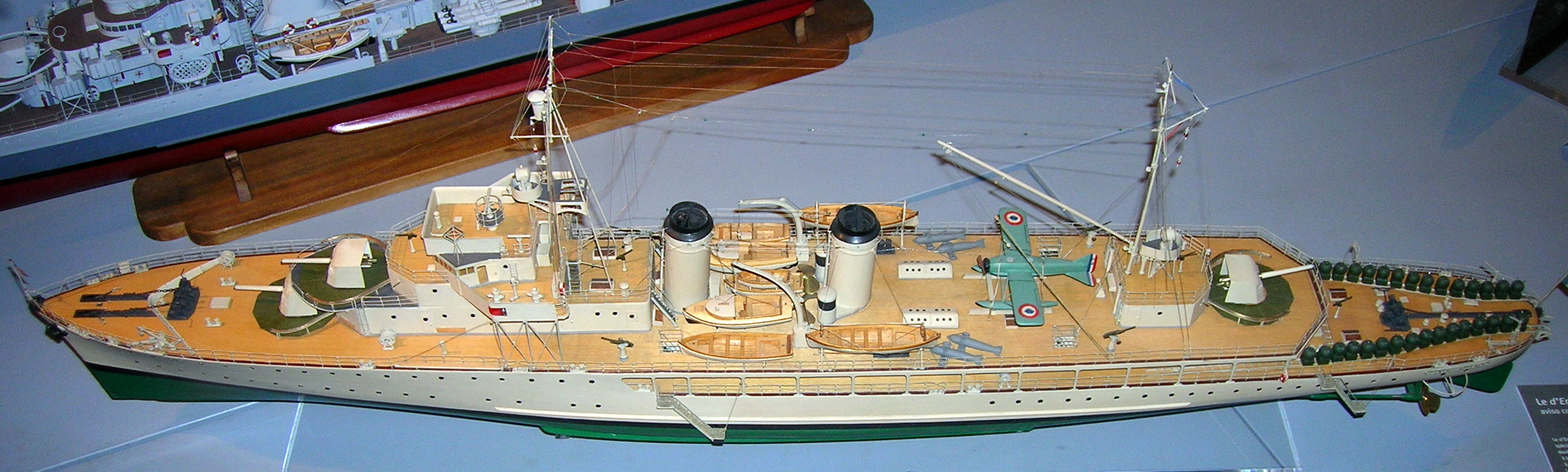
Model of sister ship D'Entrecasteaux at the Musée de la Marine de Paris

The Bougainville-class avisos were intended for service in the French colonial empire in austere conditions. They had an overall length of 103.7 metres (340 ft 3 in), a beam of 12.7 metres (41 ft 8 in), and a draught of 4.15 metres (13 ft 7 in). The ships displaced 1,969 tonnes (1,938 long tons) at standard load and 2,600 tonnes (2,600 long tons) at deep load. The superstructure, decks, and the upper plating of the hull was made from armor-steel plates 5–6 millimetres (0.20–0.24 in) thick to better resist small arms and machine gun bullets. Their crew consisted of 14 officers and 121 ratings in peacetime.

The Bougainville class was powered by a pair of license-built six-cylinder diesel engines, each driving one propeller shaft. Amiral Charner had Burmeister & Wain two-stroke engines rated at a total of 4,200 metric horsepower (3,089 kW; 4,143 bhp) for a designed speed of 15.5 knots (28.7 km/h; 17.8 mph). The ships carried enough diesel fuel to give them a range of 9,000 nautical miles (17,000 km; 10,000 mi) at 14 knots (26 km/h; 16 mph).

The Bougainville-class ships were armed with three Canon de 138.6-millimetre (5.46 in) Mle 1927 guns in single mounts, one superfiring pair forward of the superstructure and the third gun atop the aft superstructure. They were protected by 3 mm-thick (0.12 in) gun shields. The ships were fitted with a 3-metre (9 ft 10 in) Mle 1932 coincidence rangefinder on the roof of the bridge that fed data to the type aviso mechanical fire-control computer. The anti-aircraft armament of the Bougainville class consisted of four 50-caliber Canon de 37 mm (1.5 in) Mle 1925 AA guns in single mounts. Short-range protection against strafing aircraft was provided by eight Mitrailleuse de 8 mm (0.3 in) Mle 1914 in four twin mountings. The ships were fitted with mine rails, one set on each side of the aft superstructure to allow them to lay defensive minefields. They could carry 50 Breguet B4 mines or a smaller number of larger Harlé H4 mines. They were also fitted with four minesweeping paravanes on the quarterdeck. The minerails could also be used to drop depth charges over the stern via trolleys; a total of 16 depth charges could be loaded on the rails.

Between the mainmast and the aft funnel, space was reserved for a reconnaissance seaplane, either a Gourdou-Leseurre GL-832 HY floatplane or a Potez 452 flying boat. The aircraft was lifted onto the water and recovered back on board by a derrick attached to the mainmast.

== Construction and career ==
Rigault de Genouilly was laid down at Forges et Chantiers de la Gironde on the Gironde estuary in Lormont, France, on 7 July 1931. Launched on 18 September 1932, she was commissioned on 14 March 1934. Soon after her commissioning, Rigault de Genouilly departed in March 1934 on a cruise to Easter Island, where she arrived on 24 July 1934 and disembarked a scientific mission from the National Museum of Natural History (Muséum national d'histoire naturelle).

In March 1938, a small group of sailors ordered to join Rigault de Genouilly′s crew began a voyage aboard the cargo ship Ville d'Amiens from Marseille, France, bound for Nouméa on Grande Terre in New Caledonia, where they reported aboard Rigault de Genouilly on 13 March 1938. Rigault de Genouilly then departed Nouméa for Port Vila on Efate in the New Hebrides, from which she conducted an exercise with the training cruiser Jeanne d'Arc. She resumed her cruise and arrived at Papeete on Tahiti in French Polynesia on 15 June 1938. Repainted in gray, she next proceeded to Sydney, Australia.

On 20 February 1939, Rigault de Genouilly began a deployment in the Far East when she departed for Saigon in French Indochina. After the aviso Savorgnan de Brazza relieved her on the French Indochina station, Rigault de Genouilly visited Shanghai, China.

=== World War II ===
==== French Navy ====
World War II began on 1 September 1939 with the German invasion of Poland. France entered the war on the side of the Allies on 3 September 1939. On 10 October 1939, Rigault de Genouilly began a deployment in the Indian Ocean. She changed crews on 6 March 1940 at Diego Suarez on Madagascar.

German ground forces advanced into France on 10 May 1940, beginning the Battle of France. Italy declared war on France on 10 June 1940 and joined the invasion. The Battle of France ended in France's defeat and its armistice of 22 June 1940 with Germany and Italy, which went into effect on 25 June 1940.

==== Vichy France ====
After France′s surrender, Rigault de Genouilly served in the naval forces of Vichy France. She was based at Oran in Algeria on 3 July 1940, when the British began Operation Catapult, which sought to seize or neutralize the ships of the French Navy to prevent their use by the Axis powers. The Royal Navy′s Force H arrived off the French naval base at Mers El Kébir near Oran that day and demanded that the French Navy either turn over the ships based there to British custody or disable them. When the French refused, the British warships opened fire on the French ships in the harbor at 17:57, beginning their attack on Mers-el-Kébir. The French battleship Strasbourg managed to put to sea from Mers El Kébir and make for Toulon, France. Rigault de Genouilly quickly got underway and attempted to join Strasbourg′s escort, but lacked the speed to keep up with the battleship and turned back for Oran.

As Rigault de Genouilly headed back to Oran, she encountered the ships of Force H, which were in pursuit of Strasbourg, at 19:33. Rigault de Genouilly steamed toward the British battlecruiser HMS Hood. The British light cruisers HMS Arethusa and HMS Enterprise opened fire on Rigault de Genouilly at ranges of 12,000 and 18,000 yd (11,000 and 16,500 m), respectively, and Hood also fired several 15-inch (381 mm) shells at her. Rigault de Genouilly fired nineteen 14 cm (5.5 in) shells in return before taking a hit from Enterprise and withdrawing. Focused on their attempt to catch Strasbourg, the British did not pursue Rigault de Genouilly after the brief exchange of gunfire.

=== Loss ===
On 4 July 1940, the British submarine HMS Pandora sighted the damaged Rigault de Genouilly along the Algerian coast off Algiers near Cap Matifou. Mistaking her for a cruiser, Pandora torpedoed and sank her with the loss of 12 lives. The British Admiralty apologized to the French Embassy for the sinking.

== Bibliography ==
- Jordan, John (2016). "The Colonial Sloops of the Bougainville Class". Warship 2016. London: Conway. pp. 8–29. ISBN 978-1-84486-326-6.
- Landais, Henri (2012). Les Avisos Coloniaux de 2000 tW (1930–1960) [The 2000-ton Colonial Avisos] (in French). Outreau, France: Lela Presse. ISBN 978-2-914017-64-0.
- Le Masson, Henri (1969). The French Navy. Navies of the Second World War. Vol. 2. London: MacDonald & Co. ISBN 0-356-02385-0.
- Morareau, Lucien (November–December 2011). "Les hydravions des avisos coloniaux: Première partie". Avions (in French). pp. 2–24.
- O'Hara, Vincent P. (2009). Struggle for the Middle Sea: The Great Navies at War in the Mediterranean Theater, 1940–1945. Annapolis, MD: Naval Institute Press. ISBN 978-1-59114-648-3.
- Richardot, Raymond (1938). Richardot: quartie-maître électricien sur l'aviso colonial Rigault de Genouilly (in French). Author's manuscript.
- Roberts, John (1980). "France". In Chesneau, Roger (ed.). Conway's All the World's Fighting Ships 1922–1946. New York: Mayflower Books. pp. 255–279. ISBN 0-8317-0303-2.
- Rohwer, Jürgen (2005). Chronology of the War at Sea 1939–1945: The Naval History of World War Two (Third Revised ed.). Annapolis, Maryland: Naval Institute Press. ISBN 1-59114-119-2.
