= French cruiser Lamotte-Picquet =

French Duguay-Trouin-class light cruiser

Lamotte-Picquet
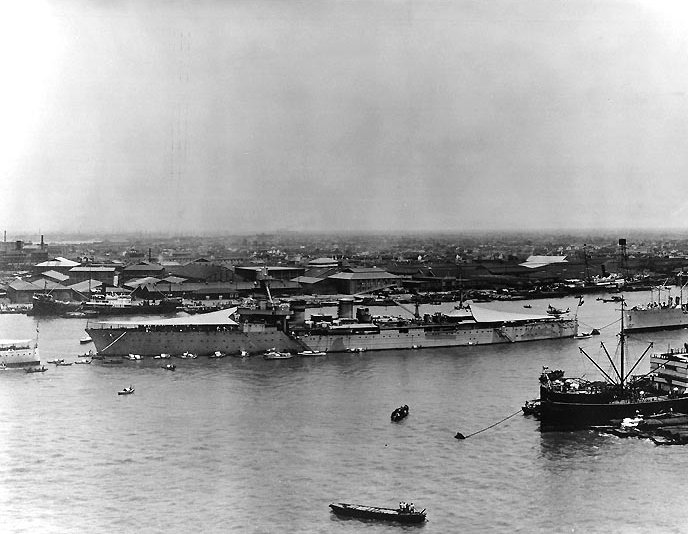
- Lamotte-Picquet at Shanghai in 1939

History

France
- Name: Lamotte-Picquet
- Namesake: Toussaint-Guillaume Picquet de la Motte
- Builder: Arsenal de Lorient
- Laid down: 17 January 1923
- Launched: 21 March 1924
- Commissioned: 5 March 1927
- Out of service: November 1941
- Fate: Sunk during the South China Sea raid, 12 January 1945

General characteristics
- Class & type: Duguay-Trouin-class cruiser
- Displacement: 7,249 tons (standard); 9350 tons (full load)
- Length: 181.30 m (594 ft 10 in) overall
- Beam: 17.50 m (57 ft 5 in)
- Draught: 6.14 m (20 ft 2 in), 6.30 m (20 ft 8 in) full load
- Propulsion: 4-shaft Parsons single-reduction geared turbines; 8 Guyot boilers; 102,000 shp (76,000 kW)
- Speed: 33 knots (61 km/h)
- Range: 3,000 nautical miles (6,000 km) at 15 knots (28 km/h)
- Complement: 27 officers, 551 sailors
- Armament: 8 × 155 mm (6.1 in)/50 guns (4 × 2); 4 × 75 mm (3 in) anti-aircraft guns (4 × 1); 12 × 550 mm (22 in) torpedo tubes (4 × 3)
- Armour: Deck: 20 mm (0.79 in); Magazine box: 30 mm (1.2 in); Turrets and conning tower: 30 mm (1.2 in)
- Aircraft carried: 2 Gourdou-Leseurre GL-812, later GL-832; 1 catapult

Lamotte-Picquet (French pronunciation: [lamɔt pikɛ]) was a French Duguay-Trouin-class light cruiser, launched in 1924, and named in honour of the 18th century admiral count Toussaint-Guillaume Picquet de la Motte.

== Design and description ==
The design of the Duguay-Trouin class was based on an improved version of a 1915 design, but was reworked with more speed and a more powerful armament to match the British E-class and the American Omaha-class light cruisers. The ships had an overall length of 175.3 meters (575 ft 2 in), a beam of 17.2 meters (56 ft 5 in), and a draft of 5.3 meters (17 ft 5 in). They displaced 8,128 metric tons (8,000 long tons) at standard load and 9,655 t (9,503 long tons) at deep load. Their crew consisted of 591 men when serving as flagships.

== Service history ==
Completed in 1927, Lamotte-Picquet was based at Brest until 1933, serving with the 3rd Light Division, of which she was flagship. In 1935, she was sent to the Far East, where at the outbreak of war in 1939, she patrolled around French Indochina and the Dutch East Indies.

After the French surrender in Europe, tension developed along the border with Siam (now Thailand). These flared into hostilities between Siam and Vichy France in December 1940. In January 1941, Lamotte-Picquet became the flagship of a small squadron, the Groupe Occasionnel. It was formed on 9 December at Cam Ranh Bay, near Saigon, under the command of Capitaine de Vaisseau Bérenger. The squadron also consisted of the colonial sloops Dumont d'Urville and Amiral Charner, and the older sloops Tahure and Marne. The Groupe Occasionnel with Lamotte-Picquet at its head, met a Thai squadron of two torpedo boats and the coastal defence ship HTMS Thonburi in the Battle of Koh Chang on 17 January 1941.

The Thai squadron was defeated, with both torpedo boats sunk and the coastal defence ship run aground. The Lamotte-Picquet suffered insignificant damage (though 11 sailors died) during the engagement, and also retreated after her victory over the Thai Navy. There had been several minor contesting claims against the official report of no damage, including a reference book Janes Fighting Ships (1955 edition).

The victory was for naught, however, as the Japanese forced a settlement in the Franco-Thai War in favour of the Thais. By this time the Lamotte-Picquet was showing her age, and needed it's boilers overhauled and hull repairs. Since the port at Saigon was too small, the ship was forced to travel to Osaka, Japan in September 1941. Near the end of 1942 it was placed in reserve in Saigon.

She was sunk in Đồng Nai River, on 12 January 1945, by U.S carrier based aircraft from Task Force 38 during the South China Sea raid. The remains of the hull were scrapped after the war.

== Bibliography ==
- Guiglini, Jean & Moreau, Albert (2001). "French Light Cruisers: The First Light Cruisers of the 1922 Naval Program, Part 1". Warship International. XXXVIII (3): 269–299. ISSN 0043-0374.
- Guiglini, Jean & Moreau, Albert (2001). "French Light Cruisers: The First Light Cruisers of the 1922 Naval Program, Part 2". Warship International. XXXVIII (4): 355–390. ISSN 0043-0374.
- Jordan, John & Moulin, Jean (2013). French Cruisers 1922–1956. Barnsley, UK: Seaforth Publishing. ISBN 978-1-84832-133-5.
