= Dumont d'Urville (disambiguation) =

Jules Dumont d'Urville (1790–1842) was a French explorer and naval officer.

Dumont d'Urville may also refer to:

- French aviso Dumont d'Urville, a Bougainville-class aviso of the French Navy
- Dumont d'Urville Station, a French scientific station in Antarctica
