= La Motte-Picquet-class cruiser =

Planned class of pre-WWI French light cruisers

- Schematics of the planned La Motte-Picquet class

Class overview
- Name: La Motte-Picquet class
- Builders: Toulon Naval Dockyard (planned)
- Operators: French Navy
- Preceded by: None
- Succeeded by: Duguay-Trouin class
- Planned: 3
- Completed: 0
- Canceled: 3

General characteristics
- Type: Light cruiser
- Displacement: 4,500 t (standard); 6,000 t (full load)
- Length: 138 m (452.8 ft) oa
- Beam: 13.8 m (45.3 ft)
- Draught: 4.8 m (15.7 ft)
- Installed power: 4 dual-fired and 8 coal-fired boilers; 40,000 shp (30,000 kW)
- Propulsion: 4-shaft turbines
- Speed: 29 knots (54 km/h; 33 mph)
- Range: 3,300 nautical miles (6,100 km; 3,800 mi) at 16 knots (30 km/h; 18 mph)
- Complement: 17 officers, 340 sailors
- Armament: 8 × 138.6 mm (5.46 in)/55 guns (8 × 1); 2 × 47-millimetre (1.9 in)/40 (2 × 1); 4 × 450 mm (18 in) torpedo tubes (4 × 1)
- Armour: Belt: 28 mm (1.1 in); Magazine box: 28 mm (1.1 in); Gun shields: 10 mm (0.4 in)

The La Motte-Picquet class were a planned series of light cruisers for the French Navy and named after French admiral Toussaint-Guillaume Picquet de la Motte. Although designed in 1912, the scheduled construction of La Motte-Picquet was suspended due to the outbreak of World War I before the ships could be laid down. The design would be revived and used as the basis for the Duguay-Trouin class after the war. The name of the planned 1912 lead ship, would be reused by the French cruiser Lamotte-Picquet.

== Design and development ==
The design work on the La Motte-Picquet class has its origins in the early 1900s. France, had lagged behind neighbouring European powers such as the United Kingdom and the German Empire in naval construction. This was due to France's continued focus on building armoured cruisers. These ships were powerful, heavily armoured but costly, and increasingly obsolete (Britain and Germany having stopped building armoured cruisers several years earlier) compared to newer types of warships such as battlecruisers. By 1912, the deficit of newer modern classes of ships such as super-dreadnought-type battleships, and light cruisers in the French navy had become increasingly obvious. The French Minister of Marine issued an ambitious Statut Naval (Naval Law) on 30 March 1912, to reverse the perceived decline in French naval power. The 1912 Statut Naval called for the construction of 28 battleships, 10 scout cruisers, 52 fleet torpedo boats, 94 submarines and 10 ships for "distant stations" by 1920.

Initial plans were for 6,000-tonne éclaireurs d'escadre (fleet scouts), but shortly after a smaller design was chosen, similar to the British Arethusa class and German Karlsruhe class and Magdeburg classes. Three of these ships, which were subsequently reclassified as convoyeurs d'escadrilles (flotilla leaders) were ordered, with one to be laid down in the Toulon Naval Dockyard in November 1914 and a further two to be built by private shipyards. Shortly after Germany declared war on France on 3 August 1914, all naval construction in France was suspended and the design plans for the La Motte-Picquet class laid in abeyance. The plans were reviewed in July 1915 by the STCN (Service technique des constructions navales), with several suggestions to improve the design. These suggestions were, enlarging the ship, the addition of four 65 mm/50 Modèle 1902 high-angle guns, suppression of the main mast and the reduction of shafts from four to two. These proposals were not adopted and the plans remained dormant. France would not operate any modern light cruisers throughout the rest of the war and her first modern light cruisers would be war prizes from the Imperial German Navy and Austro-Hungarian Navy. In September 1919, the light cruiser design was revived and the suggested 1915 changes to the La Motte-Picquet class were reused as the basis for developing France's first postwar ships, the Duguay-Trouin-class cruisers. These light cruisers would be the first warships designed and built after the Great War in the world. These revised plans were for six new cruisers were presented by the new French Minister of Marine, Georges Leygues on 13 January 1920 under the 'Project 171' program. Project 171 was a major restructuring plan for the French navy after the huge economic and financial toll left on France after the First World War. The project also called for the building of twelve new torpilleurs-éclaireurs (scout torpedo boats) and the abandonment of the incomplete Normandie class of battleships save for one, which would be converted into the aircraft carrier Béarn.

The La Motte-Picquet class was to be the French Navy's first light cruisers, having previously only constructed armoured and protected cruisers. The defining feature of light cruisers being an armoured belt along their outer hull. The La Motte-Picquets was planned to have a relatively thin 28 mm (1.1 in) thick belt over the machinery with end bulkheads of 14–16 mm (0.55–0.63 in). The gun shields were only 5–10 mm (0.2–0.4 in) thick. Other common areas of protection such as the conning tower and deck armour thickness are not known.

The La Motte-Picquet class' primary armament were to be eight 138.6 mm (5.5 in) Canon de 138 mm Modèle 1910 naval guns which were the secondary armament of the Courbet and Bretagne-class battleships and primary armament of the Arras-class avisoes (fr). All main guns were to be in single shielded mounts, with two forward, two aft, and four mountings amidships. Secondary armaments consisted of two 47 mm (2 in) QF 3-pounder Hotchkiss guns. The torpedo armament was to consist of four 450 mm (17.7 in) above-water tubes on the main deck above the engine room.

Unlike contemporary British cruisers of the period which had a raked bow, the La Motte-Picquet class had a traditional hull with a straight stem. Another conservative element in the La Motte-Picquet class compared to light cruisers of other countries was the propulsion system. While other countries had begun building cruisers with destroyer turbine engines, the La Motte-Picquet class would be powered by twelve boilers, of which were eight coal-fired and four partial oil-firing. The projected speed of the cruisers would be 29 knots (54 km/h; 33 mph).

== See also ==
- German FK cruiser designs - World War I German cruiser design series, never built

== Bibliography ==
- Jourdan, John (2013). "The Duguay-Trouin class". French Cruisers, 1922–1956. Barnsley, South Yorkshire: Seaforth Publishing. pp. 24–25. ISBN 978-1-84832-133-5.
