= Duguay-Trouin-class cruiser =

French warships

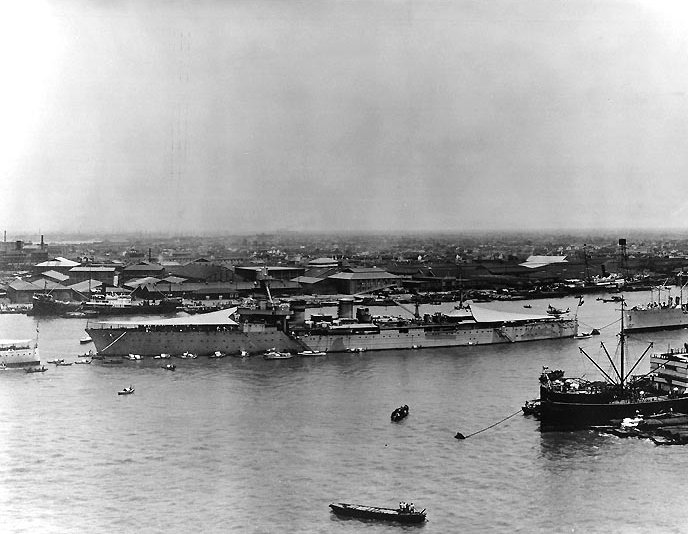
- Lamotte-Picquet at Shanghai, 1939

Class overview
- Name: Duguay-Trouin class
- Builders: Arsenal de Brest; Arsenal de Lorient
- Operators: French Navy
- Preceded by: La Motte-Picquet class (Planned); None (actual)
- Succeeded by: Jeanne d'Arc
- Built: 1922–1927
- In service: 1926–1952
- In commission: 1926–1952
- Completed: 3
- Lost: 2
- Retired: 1

General characteristics
- Type: Light cruiser
- Displacement: 7,249 tons (7,365 t) (standard); 9,350 tons (9,500 t) (full load)
- Length: 181.30 m (594 ft 10 in) overall
- Beam: 17.50 m (57 ft 5 in)
- Draught: 5.2 metres (17 ft 1 in)
- Installed power: 8 Guyot du Temple three-drum boilers; 100,000 shp (75,000 kW)
- Propulsion: 4 shafts; geared steam turbines;
- Speed: 30 knots (56 km/h; 35 mph)
- Range: 3,000 nmi (5,600 km; 3,500 mi) at 15 knots (28 km/h; 17 mph)
- Complement: 27 officers, 551 sailors
- Armament: 8 × 155 mm (6.1 in)/50 guns (4 × 2); 4 × 75 mm (3 in) anti-aircraft guns (4 × 1); 12 × 550 mm (22 in) torpedo tubes (4 × 3)
- Armour: Deck: 20 mm (0.79 in); Magazine box: 30 mm (1.2 in); Turrets and conning tower: 30 mm (1.2 in)
- Aircraft carried: 2 Gourdou-Leseurre GL-812, later GL-832, later 1 Loire 130; 1 catapult

The Duguay-Trouin class (French pronunciation: [dyɡɛ tʁuɛ̃]) were the first major French warships built after World War I. They were excellent steamers and proved successful and seaworthy over a quarter century of service. All three achieved 33 knots (61 km/h; 38 mph) on trials and could easily maintain 30 knots (56 km/h; 35 mph) in service. Twenty-year-old Duguay-Trouin could still maintain 27.7 knots (51.3 km/h; 31.9 mph) at her post-war displacement of 10,900 tons. They were fast and economical, although with a limited range. The fate of these three ships after the French surrender illustrates the dichotomy within the French armed forces at the time: one ship was interned, then joined the Free French, another twice resisted Allied bombardment and was destroyed, and the third was disarmed at a French colonial port and subsequently sunk.

== Design ==
The design of this class was the result of a protracted process that had started in mid-1919, with the Italians as likely adversaries. A detailed design (Project 171) had been completed by the end of 1919, but there were significant reservations within the Navy and the Chief of the General Staff withdrew them in February 1920. While discussion continued, there were opportunities to compare with newly commissioned cruisers of other navies. The foreign designs were indeed superior, particularly armament.

At the end of 1920, after having examined copies of the plans for the U.S. Omaha class, four designs had been drafted. All four used hulls based on the Omaha's, with eight newly designed 155 mm (6.1 in) and four 75 mm (3 in) anti-aircraft guns and twelve torpedo tubes. The differences lay in the combinations of power and protection.

Design C was selected and detailed work started. The new class would achieve 34 knots (63 km/h; 39 mph), using oil firing and single-reduction geared turbines. The main armament would be a new breech-loading M1920 gun of 155 mm calibre with a range of 26,100 metres (28,500 yd). The calibre was selected to use the same 155 mm shells manufactured for the Army. In action, this weapon proved to be slow to operate. The 75 mm anti-aircraft battery was of the M1922 type.

The ships were lightly armored with barely splinter-proof gun shields, but extensive watertight subdivision included sixteen transverse bulkheads, with a double hull around the engineering spaces. Orders were placed during 1922 on this basis, despite determined efforts to "improve" the design. After completion, single catapults were installed on the quarter-decks of each ship, initially with two Gourdou-Leseurre GL-812 HY seaplanes, later the GL-832. Duguay-Trouin and Primauguet were subsequently equipped with a single Loire 130 in the 1930s.

== Ships in class ==
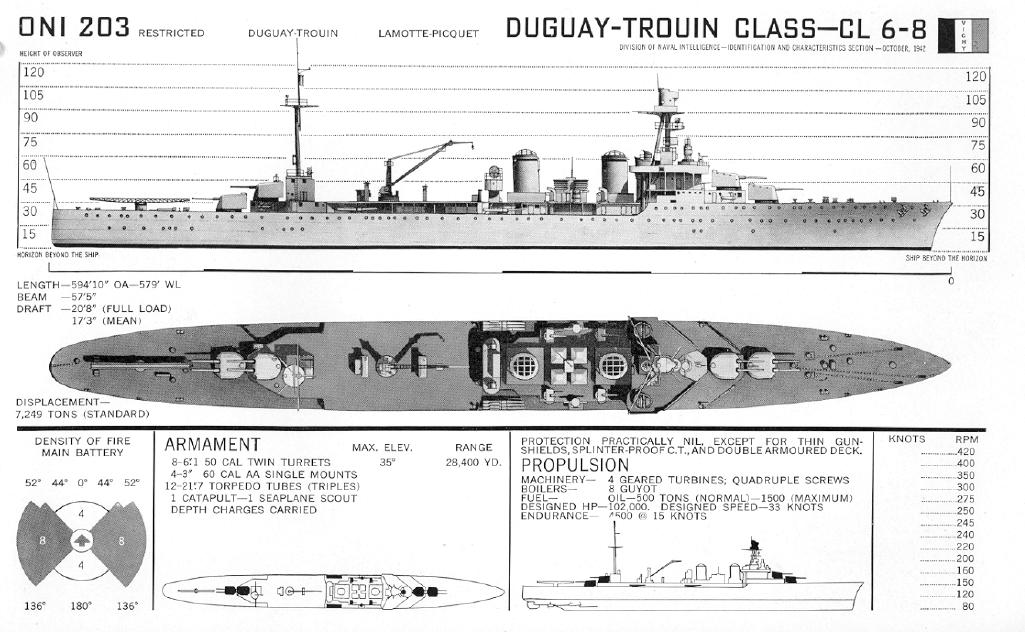
1942 illustration of the Duguay-Trouin-class published by the US Office of Naval Intelligence

=== Duguay-Trouin ===
Duguay-Trouin was completed 2 November 1926 and served briefly in French Indochina in 1931. She patrolled the Atlantic for German shipping and commerce raiders following declaration of World War II hostilities. She patrolled the Mediterranean Sea from May 1940, and was at Alexandria with Force X when France surrendered. The ship was demilitarized at Alexandria for three years until refitted beginning in August 1943 by removal of torpedo tubes and augmentation of anti-aircraft armament by fifteen Oerlikon 20 mm cannon and six 13.2 mm Hotchkiss machine guns. Anti-aircraft armament was modified in 1944 to twenty 20 mm and six Bofors 40 mm guns, when radar was also added. Duguay-Trouin returned to the Mediterranean to support Operation Dragoon and Flank Force bombardment of German positions in Italy. She returned to French Indochina for post-war operations against the Viet Minh until scrapped 29 March 1952.

=== Lamotte-Picquet ===
Lamotte-Picquet was completed 5 March 1927 and deployed to French Indochina in 1935. She was Admiral Jean Decoux's flagship of French Naval Forces, Far East, during the 17 January 1941 Battle of Ko Chang against the Thai fleet. She was decommissioned at Saigon in 1942 where she served as a barracks ship until sunk by United States Task Force 58 aircraft on 12 January 1945.

=== Primauguet ===
Primauguet was completed 1 April 1927 and deployed to French Indochina from 1932 until declaration of World War II hostilities in September 1939. She then conducted Atlantic patrols, and evacuated French gold to North Africa. She recaptured the freighter Fort de France which had been seized by the Royal Navy en route from Martinique to France. In 1942, Primauguet had her anti-aircraft battery increased by two 25 mm Hotchkiss anti-aircraft guns and twenty 13.2 mm machine guns. She was sunk by the battleship USS Massachusetts and the cruiser USS Wichita on 8 November 1942 during the Naval Battle of Casablanca.
