= French cruiser Primauguet (1924) =

1924 Duguay-Trouin-class cruiser

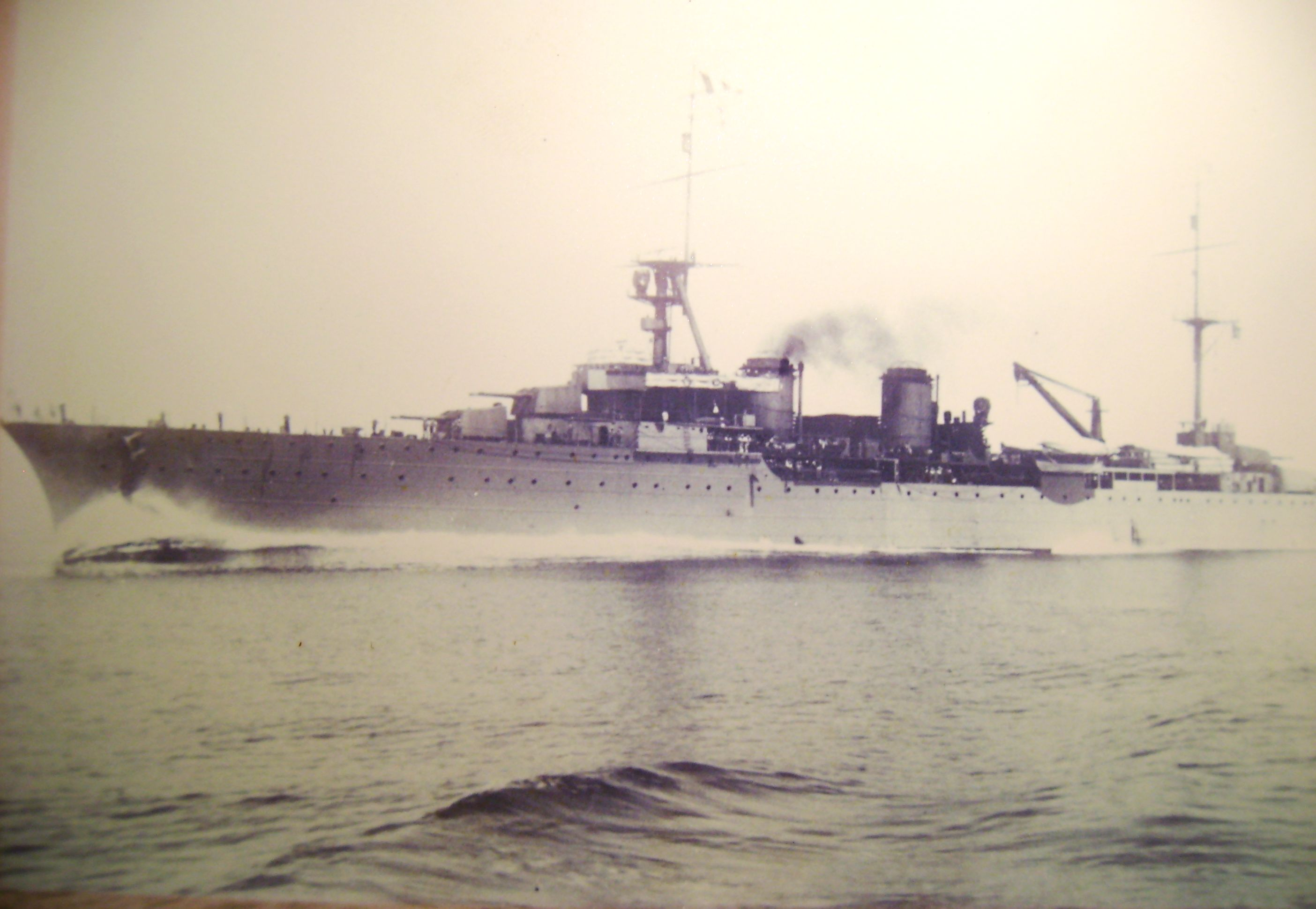
- Primauguet

History

France
- Name: Primauguet
- Namesake: Hervé de Portzmoguer
- Builder: Arsenal de Brest
- Laid down: 16 August 1923
- Launched: 21 May 1924
- Commissioned: 1 April 1927
- Fate: Destroyed in harbour, 8 November 1942

General characteristics
- Class & type: Duguay-Trouin-class cruiser
- Displacement: 7,249 tons (standard); 9350 tons (full load)
- Length: 181.30 m (594 ft 10 in) overall
- Beam: 17.50 m (57 ft 5 in)
- Draught: 6.14 m (20 ft 2 in), 6.30 m (20 ft 8 in) full load
- Propulsion: 4-shaft Parsons single-reduction geared turbines; 8 Guyot boilers; 102,000 shp (76,000 kW)
- Speed: 33 knots (61 km/h; 38 mph)
- Range: 3,000 nautical miles (5,600 km; 3,500 mi) at 15 knots (28 km/h; 17 mph)
- Complement: 27 officers, 551 sailors
- Armament: Initial; 8 × 155 mm (6.1 in)/50 guns (4 × 2); 4 × 75 mm (3 in) anti-aircraft guns (4 × 1); 12 × 550 mm (22 in) torpedo tubes (4 × 3); 1942 refit; 8 × 155 mm (6.1 in)/50 guns (4 × 2); 4 × 75 mm (3 in) anti-aircraft guns (4 × 1); 2 × 25 mm (1 in) light AA guns (2 × 1); 20 × 13.2 mm (1 in) AA machine guns (10 × 2); 12 × 550 mm (22 in) torpedo tubes (4 × 3)
- Armour: Deck: 20 mm (0.79 in); Magazine box: 30 mm (1.2 in); Turrets and conning tower: 30 mm (1.2 in)
- Aircraft carried: 2 Gourdou-Leseurre GL-812, later GL-832; 1 catapult

Primauguet was a French Duguay-Trouin-class light cruiser built after World War I. During the Anglo-American invasion of French North Africa in 1942, she was burnt out and abandoned, having been subject to gunfire from a fleet led by the battleship Massachusetts, and repeated aerial attacks by SBD Dauntless dive bombers. She was named after the 15th century Breton captain Hervé de Portzmoguer, nicknamed "Primauguet".

== Design and description ==
The design of the Duguay-Trouin class was based on an improved version of a 1915 design, but was reworked with more speed and a more powerful armament to match the British E-class and the American Omaha-class light cruisers. The ships had an overall length of 175.3 meters (575 ft 2 in), a beam of 17.2 meters (56 ft 5 in), and a draft of 5.3 meters (17 ft 5 in). They displaced 8,128 metric tons (8,000 long tons) at standard load and 9,655 t (9,503 long tons) at deep load. Their crew consisted of 591 men when serving as flagships.

== Service ==
Primauguet was commissioned in April 1927 and immediately commenced a seven-month world cruise, returning in mid-December. The pattern of extended cruises was maintained until April 1932, when she was stationed in the Far East until a refit in January 1936. The Far East posting was resumed in November 1937 until she was relieved by the cruiser Suffren and returned to France.

The first months of World War II were spent on Atlantic patrols, convoy escort and surveillance of Axis shipping. On 1 April 1940, she sailed for Fort-de-France in the West Indies, to replace the cruiser Jeanne d'Arc. She operated in Dutch West Indies waters, intercepting merchant ships. On 6 May 1940, Primauguet, under the command of Vessel Captain Pierre Goybet, relieved the British sloop Dundee off Aruba and, at the Dutch surrender, she landed forces to secure the oil installations. Primauguet returned to Dakar on 12 June 1940, after the French surrender .

Primauguet remained with the Vichy French Navy. She brought a part of the French Gold Reserve of Banque de France in Africa. Primauguet was at Dakar in July 1940 during the Royal Navy's attack on the French fleet at Mers-el-Kebir.

She was sent to escort an oiler in support of three La Galissonnière-class cruisers of the 4th Squadron. They were on an operation to Libreville, in French Equatorial Africa, to counter Free French activity. In the Bight of Benin, the French force was intercepted by the British cruisers Cornwall and Delhi. After negotiations, Primauguet was ordered to turn back to Casablanca by Admiral Bourague, aboard Georges Leygues.

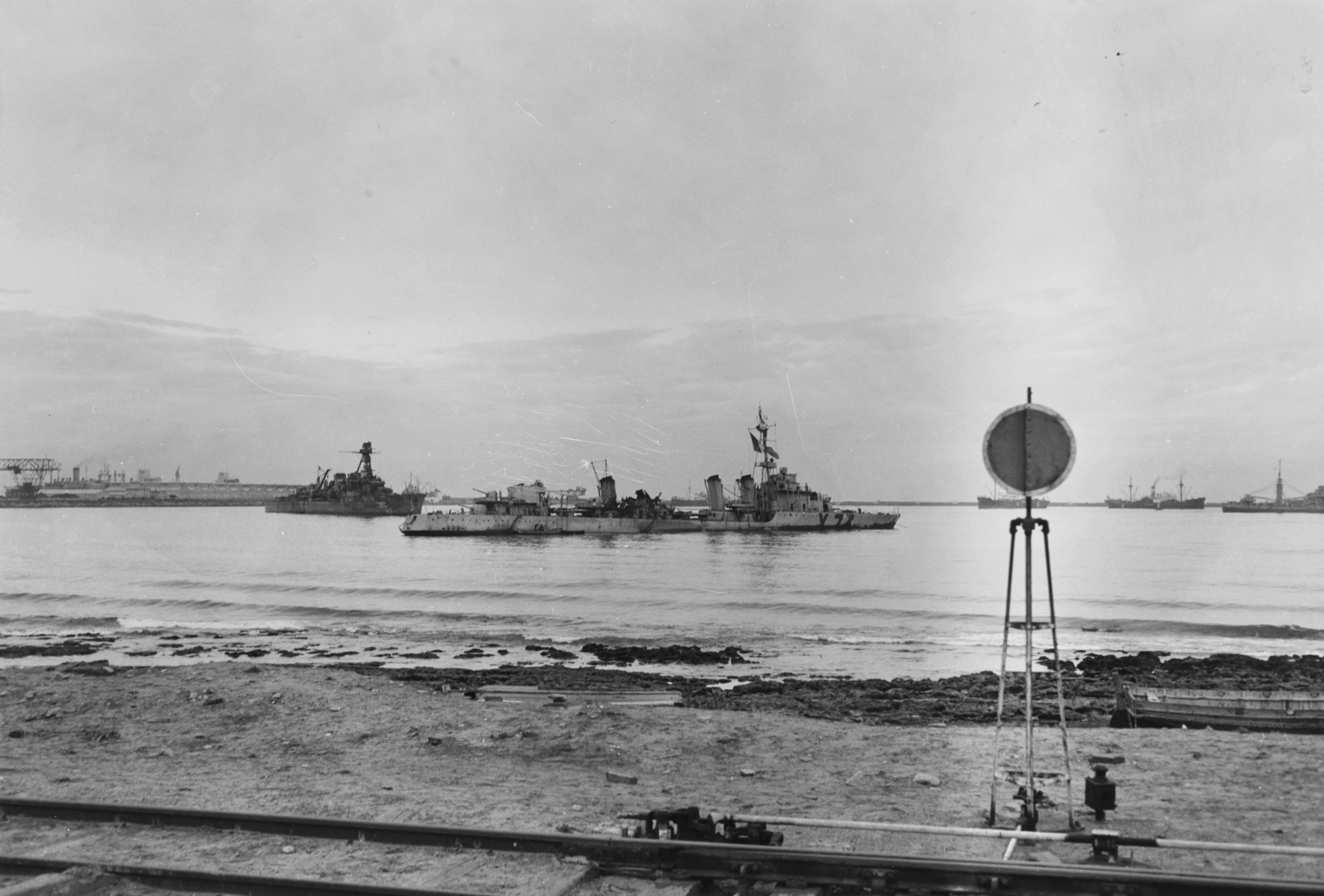
Primauguet (left) and Albatros wrecked at Casablanca, December 1942

On 8 November 1941, she began a refit in Casablanca and was not fully operational when the Naval Battle of Casablanca began exactly one year later. During this unequal engagement, she was shelled by the largest ships of the opposing American forces, the US battleship Massachusetts and the 8-inch cruisers Wichita, Tuscaloosa and Augusta, as well as the 6-inch cruiser Brooklyn. She was also subject to four waves of aerial attack by Douglas Dauntless dive-bombers from the aircraft carrier USS Ranger, which claimed six direct hits. Massively outmatched by the opposing firepower, she was badly damaged and suffered many casualties. The ship dropped anchor in shallow water and later went aground where she burnt through the night. Her wreck was sold in 1951, and scrapped in place.

== Bibliography ==
- Guiglini, Jean & Moreau, Albert (2001). "French Light Cruisers: The First Light Cruisers of the 1922 Naval Program, Part 1". Warship International. XXXVIII (3): 269–299. ISSN 0043-0374.
- Guiglini, Jean & Moreau, Albert (2001). "French Light Cruisers: The First Light Cruisers of the 1922 Naval Program, Part 2". Warship International. XXXVIII (4): 355–390. ISSN 0043-0374.
- Jordan, John & Moulin, Jean (2013). French Cruisers 1922–1956. Barnsley, UK: Seaforth Publishing. ISBN 978-1-84832-133-5.
- O'Hara, Vincent P. (2015). Torch: North Africa and the Allied Path to Victory. Naval Institute Press. ISBN 978-1-61251922-7.
- Shores, Christopher; Massimello, Giovanni; with Russell Guest, Frank Olynyk and Winfried Bock (2016). A History of the Mediterranean Air War, 1940-1945. Volume Three: Tunisia and the End in Africa, November 1942 - May 1943. Grub Street Publishing. ISBN 978-1-910690-00-0.
- Whitley, M. J. (1995). Cruisers of World War Two: An International Encyclopedia. London: Cassell. ISBN 1-86019-874-0.
