= Bougainville-class aviso =

French naval ship class (1933–1959)

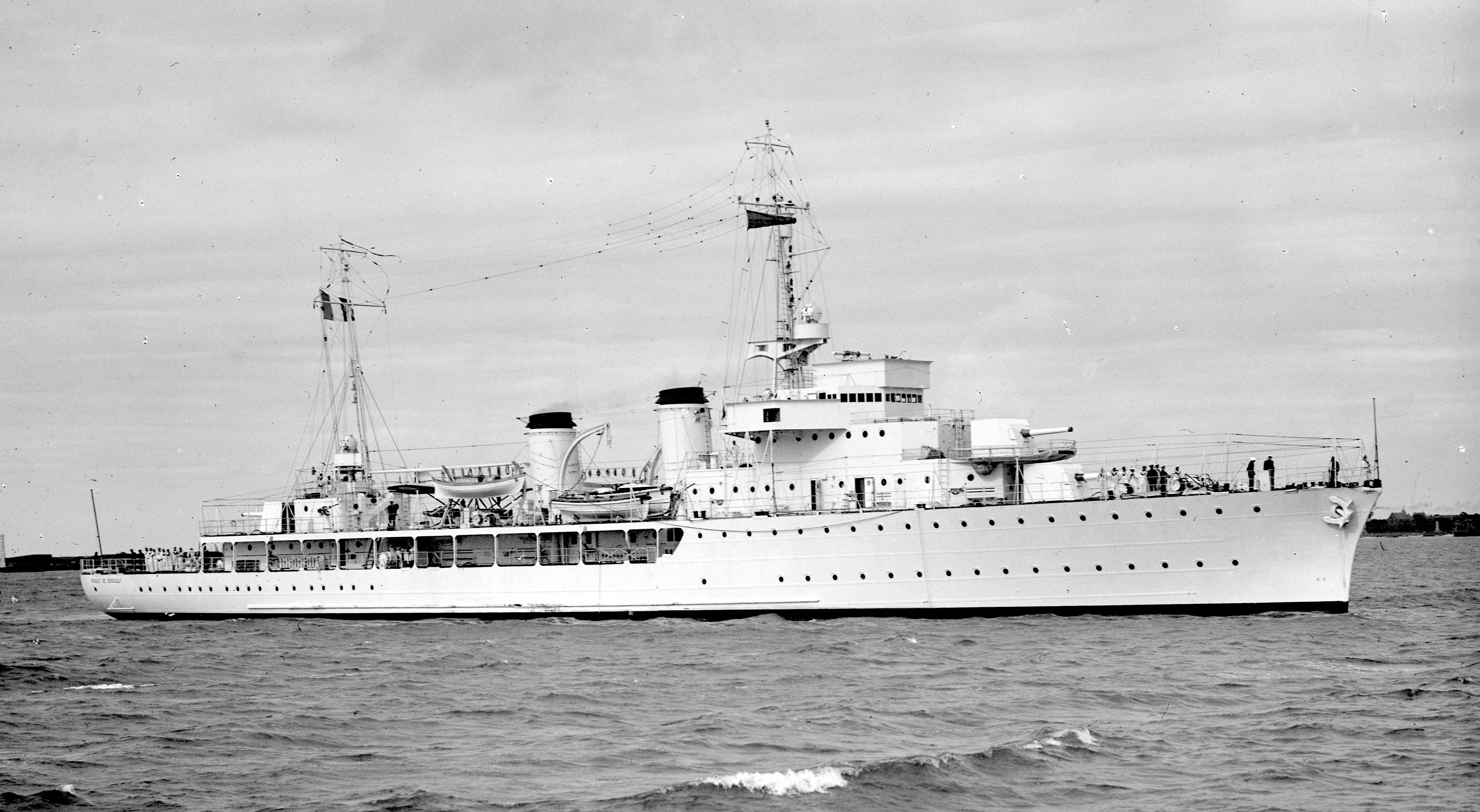
- Rigault de Genouilly in 1938

Class overview
- Name: Bougainville class
- Operators: French Navy
- Subclasses: Beautemps-Beaupré
- Cost: 36.5 million FF
- Built: 1929–1939
- In commission: 1933–1959
- Planned: 10
- Completed: 9
- Canceled: 1
- Lost: 5
- Scrapped: 4

General characteristics (as built)
- Type: Aviso
- Displacement: 1,969 t (1,938 long tons) (standard); 2,600 t (2,600 long tons) (full load)
- Length: 103.7 m (340 ft 3 in) (o/a)
- Beam: 12.7 m (41 ft 8 in)
- Draught: 4.15 m (13 ft 7 in)
- Installed power: 4,200 or 4,382 PS (3,089 or 3,223 kW; 4,143 or 4,322 bhp)
- Propulsion: 2 shafts; 2 diesel engines
- Speed: 15.5 knots (28.7 km/h; 17.8 mph)
- Range: 9,000 nmi (17,000 km; 10,000 mi) at 14 knots (26 km/h; 16 mph)
- Complement: 14 officers and 121 crewmen
- Armament: 3 × single 138.6 mm (5.5 in) guns; 4 × single 37 mm (1.5 in) AA guns; 4 × twin 8 mm (0.31 in) machine guns; 50 × mines
- Armour: Deck: 6 mm (0.24 in); Gun shields: 3 mm (0.1 in)
- Aircraft carried: 1 seaplane

The Bougainville class was a group of colonial avisos, or sloops, built for the French Navy during the 1930s. They were designed to operate in the remote locations of the French Empire.

== Design and description ==
Layout

The Bougainville-class avisos were intended for colonial service abroad in austere conditions. Endurance was one of the primary considerations as were living conditions in tropical climates for the crew. The ships also had to accommodate an admiral and his staff as they could serve as the flagship for the overseas divisions of the French Navy. The ships were equipped with air conditioning throughout and the crew's living spaces were insulated as well. The last two ships, Beautemps-Beaupré and La Pérouse, were to be completed to a modified design with a single funnel as survey ships.

They had an overall length of 103.7 metres (340 ft 3 in), a beam of 12.7 metres (41 ft 8 in), and a draught of 4.15 metres (13 ft 7 in). The ships displaced 1,969 tonnes (1,938 long tons) at standard load and 2,600 tonnes (2,600 long tons) at deep load. The hull was subdivided by 10 transverse bulkheads into 11 watertight compartments. Construction of the lower hull and keel were made from standard 50-kilogram (110 lb) mild steel. Conversely, the upper plating, specifically the deck, ammunition lobbies, gun shields, bridge, deckhouses and the lower part of the aft-funnel; were made from high-tensile, 60-kilogram (130 lb) bullet-proof "gunshield quality" (qualité masque) steel. This was a chrome-cobalt-molybdenum alloy that was used in warship armour and the French equivalent to Royal Navy, Ducol ('D') steel plate armour. This provided the Bougainville with a greater level of protection against small arms and machine gun fire than contemporary French destroyers. Their crew consisted of 14 officers and 121 ratings in peacetime.

The Bougainville class was powered by a pair of license-built, six-cylinder diesel engines that drove three-bladed propellers. Most of the ships had Burmeister & Wain, four-stroke units rated at a total of 4,382-metric-horsepower (3,223 kW; 4,322 bhp), but Dumont d'Urville, Savorgnan de Brazza and D'Iberville had 4,200 PS (3,089 kW; 4,143 bhp), two-stroke engines built by Sulzer. The Burmeister & Wain ships had 2.8-metre (9 ft 2 in) propellers while the others were 3.15 metres (10 ft 4 in) in diameter. The ships were designed to reach a normal speed of 15.5 knots (28.7 km/h; 17.8 mph) and 16.4 knots (30.4 km/h; 18.9 mph) at maximum. During her sea trials in July 1932, Bougainville reached a maximum speed of 17.5 knots (32.4 km/h; 20.1 mph). The ships carried 260 metric tons (256 long tons) of diesel fuel which gave them a range of 9,000 nautical miles (17,000 km; 10,000 mi) at 14 knots (26 km/h; 16 mph). The ships were fitted with three diesel generators in the engine room. The Burmeister & Wain ships had 85-kilowatt (114 hp), four-stroke MAN units while the Sulzer ships used 120-kilowatt (160 hp), two-stroke generators from the same manufacturer. Forward of the engine room was the auxiliary boiler room that was equipped with a pair of Riley vertical boilers rated at 10 kg/cm^{2} (981 kPa; 142 psi). In addition, two 22-kilowatt (30 hp), four-cylinder Bettus-Loire emergency diesel generators were located in the forward superstructure.

=== Armament ===
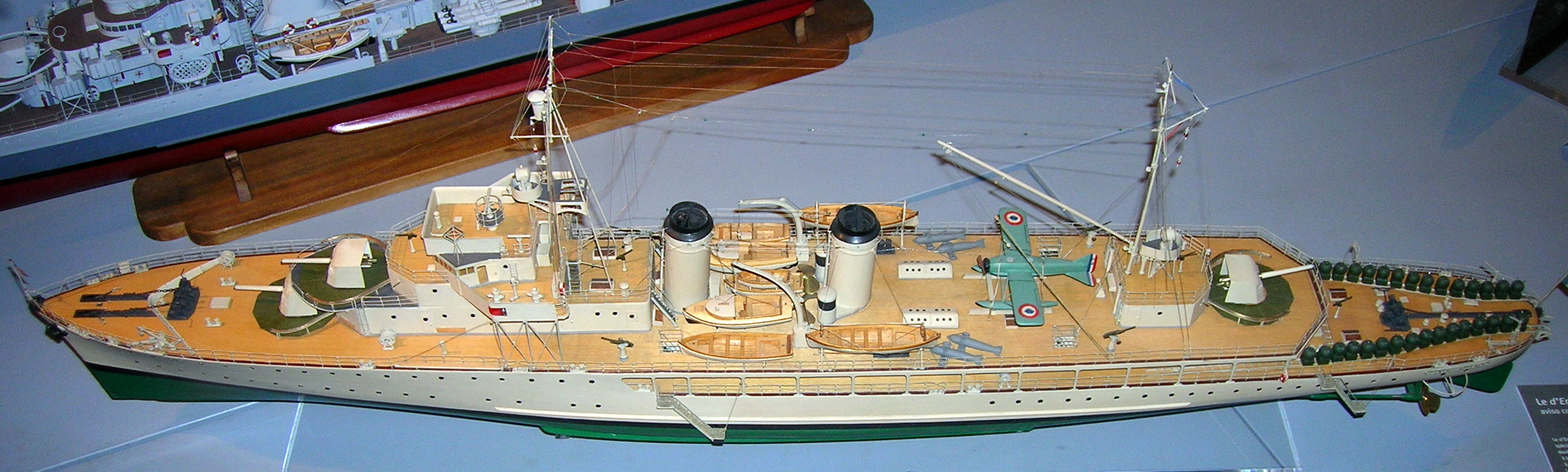
Model of D'Entrecasteaux at the Musée de la Marine de Paris

The Bougainville-class ships were armed with three 40-caliber Canon de 138.6-millimetre (5.46 in) Mle 1927 guns in single mounts, one superfiring pair forward of the superstructure and the third gun atop the aft superstructure. The mounts had a range of elevation from -10° to +28°, which gave the gun a range of 16,600 meters (18,200 yd) at maximum elevation,. They fired 40.6-kilogram (90 lb) projectiles at a muzzle velocity of 700 m/s (2,300 ft/s) at a rate of five to six rounds per minute. The fore and aft magazines had a total capacity of 785 shells. The ships were fitted with a 3-metre (9 ft 10 in) Mle 1932 coincidence rangefinder that fed data to the type aviso mechanical fire-control computer.

The anti-aircraft armament of the Bougainville class consisted of four 50-caliber Canon de 37 mm (1.5 in) Mle 1925 light AA gun guns in single mounts. Their 0.725-kilogram (1.60 lb) shells were fired at a muzzle velocity of 850 m/s (2,800 ft/s). The guns had a range of 14,100 meters (15,400 yd) and a ceiling of about 10,000 meters (33,000 ft). They had a rate of fire of 30–42 rounds per minute. The ships carried about 350 rounds for each gun. Short-range protection against strafing aircraft was provided by eight Mitrailleuse de 8 mm (0.3 in) Mle 1914 in four twin mountings. The ships were fitted with mine rails, one set on each side of the aft superstructure to allow them to lay defensive minefields. They could carry 50 Breguet B4 mines or a smaller number of larger Harlé H4 mines. They were also fitted with four minesweeping paravanes on the quarterdeck. The minerails could also be used to drop depth charges over the stern via trolleys; a total of 16 depth charges could be loaded on the rails.

Beautemps-Beaupré and La Pérouse substituted four or six 100 mm (3.9 in) guns in twin turrets for the main armament of their sister ships. Their light armament was to consist of two twin 37 mm Mle 1933 mounts and four single 20 mm (0.8 in) Oerlikon light AA guns.

To enhance the ability of the ships to patrol the large areas for which they would be responsible, they were fitted with space for a lightweight seaplane on the aft superstructure. The aircraft was intended to be accommodated in a telescoping hangar, much like the one in the light cruiser Émile Bertin, aft of the rear funnel. For this reason the aircraft was designed with folding wings, but it was easier to leave the wings extended and to cover it with a canvas tent for protection from the elements. The ships mostly used the Gourdou-Leseurre GL-832 HY floatplane, but some received Potez 452 flying boats. The aircraft was lifted onto the water and recovered back on board by a tubular derrick, but this proved to be too flimsy to handle the weight and had to be replaced by a stronger braced derrick.

== Ships ==
Ship	Namesake	Builder	Launched	Fate
Bougainville	Louis Antoine de Bougainville	FC de la Gironde, Lormont	25 April 1931	Sunk, 9 November 1940
Amiral Charner	Léonard Charner	AC Maritime de Sud-Ouest, Bordeaux	1 October 1932	Scuttled, 10 March 1945
Dumont d'Urville	Jules Dumont d'Urville	AC Maritime de Sud-Ouest, Bordeaux	21 March 1931	Broken up, 26 March 1958
D'Entrecasteaux	Antoine Bruni d'Entrecasteaux	AC de Provence, Port-de-Bouc	22 June 1931	Broken up, 19 October 1948
La Grandière (ex-Ville d'Ys)	Pierre-Paul de La Grandière	AC de Provence, Port-de-Bouc	22 June 1939	Broken up, 23 November 1959
D'Iberville	Pierre Le Moyne d'Iberville	AC Maritime de Sud-Ouest, Bordeaux	23 September 1934	Scuttled with the Vichy French fleet in Toulon, 27 November 1942
Rigault de Genouilly	Charles Rigault de Genouilly	FC de la Gironde, Lormont	18 September 1932	Sunk by HMS Pandora, 4 July 1940
Savorgnan de Brazza	Pierre Savorgnan de Brazza	AC Maritime de Sud Ouest, Bordeaux	18 June 1931	Broken up, 20 March 1957
Beautemps-Beaupré	Charles-François Beautemps-Beaupré	FC de la Gironde, Lormont	24 June 1939	Scuttled, 24 June 1940
La Pérouse	Jean-François de Galaup, comte de Lapérouse	FC de la Gironde, Lormont	Never laid down	Cancelled, 24 June 1940

== Service history ==
Eight of the Bougainville-class avisos had been commissioned by 1940; Beautemps-Beaupré was still under construction during the Fall of France, but La Pérouse had yet to be laid down. Beautemps-Beaupré was scuttled in the Gironde Estuary on 24 June 1940 to prevent her capture by the Germans. The ships of the Bougainville class had varied careers that were typical of French warships of the period and were torn between the Free French Naval Forces and Navy of Vichy France, with the ships of Vichy France being hunted by both the Axis and Allies at different times during the war. On 9 November 1940 there was a rare case of fratricide between two ships of the same class when Bougainville, lead ship of the class and loyal to the Vichy government, fought her sister ship Savorgnan de Brazza, who served in the FNFL.

This battle happened off of Libreville, during the Battle of Gabon. After a short exchange of fire, Savorgnan de Brazza had reduced Bougainville to a wreck and forced her to beach to avoid sinking. Bougainville later foundered in March 1941 during a re-floating operation. Dumont d'Urville and Amiral Charner took part in the Battle of Koh Chang on 17 January 1941. La Grandière was extensively modernised in 1944. Her anti-aircraft armament was replaced with 40 mm Bofors and 20 mm Oerlikon guns, and new anti-submarine armament of (4 depth charge throwers and 6 depth charge rails, with 66 charges) was installed. She also received two radars and a sonar. Three ships survived the war and served during the Indochina War and in the Korean War.

== Sources ==
- Campbell, John (1985). Naval Weapons of World War II. Annapolis, Maryland: Naval Institute Press. ISBN 0-87021-459-4.
- Jordan, John (2016). "The Colonial Sloops of the Bougainville Class". In Jordan, John (ed.). Warship 2016. London: Conway. pp. 8–29. ISBN 978-1-84486-326-6.
- Le Masson, Henri (1969). The French Navy. Navies of the Second World War. Vol. 2. London: MacDonald & Co. ISBN 0-356-02385-0.
- Roberts, John (1980). "France". In Chesneau, Roger (ed.). Conway's All the World's Fighting Ships 1922–1946. New York: Mayflower Books. pp. 255–279. ISBN 0-8317-0303-2.
