= Canon de 155 mm Modèle 1920 =

- Type: Naval gun
- Place of origin: France

Service history
- In service: 1920–1966
- Used by: France
- Wars: World War II

Production history
- Designed: 1920

Specifications
- Mass: 8.87 tonnes (9.78 short tons; 8.73 long tons)
- Barrel length: 8.87 meters (29.1 ft) 50 caliber
- Shell: separate-loading, bagged charge
- Shell weight: 56.5 kilograms (125 lb)
- Caliber: 155 millimeters (6.1 in)
- Breech: Welin interrupted-screw breech
- Elevation: -5° to +40°
- Traverse: Model 1921: -140° to +140°
- Rate of fire: 3-5 rpm
- Muzzle velocity: 850 meters per second (2,800 ft/s)
- Maximum firing range: 26,100 meters (28,500 yd) at 40°

The Canon de 155 mm Modèle 1920 was a medium-caliber naval gun used as the primary armament on a number of French cruisers during World War II.

== Description ==
The Canon de 155 mm Modèle 1920 was built with a liner, autofretted A tube, two part jacket and breech ring. There was a short collar at the breech end of the liner which screwed into the A tube and a Welin breech block which opened upwards. Useful life expectancy was 700 effective full charges (EFC) per barrel. These guns were carried both in twin turrets aboard cruisers and in single casemates aboard aircraft carriers. The twin turrets were slightly unusual in that each gun had its own cradle and they could be elevated or depressed independently.

== Ammunition ==
Ammunition was of separate loading type with two powder charges and a projectile.

The gun was able to fire:

- Semi Armour-Piercing - 56.5 kg (125 lb)
- High Explosive Base Fuzed - 59 kg (130 lb)
- High Explosive Nose Fuzed - 56.5 kg (125 lb)
- Illumination - Unknown

== Naval Service ==
Ship classes that carried the Canon de 155 mm Modèle 1920 include:

- Aircraft carrier Béarn
- Cruiser Jeanne d'Arc
- Duguay-Trouin-class cruisers
