= Potez 452 =

French reconnaissance flying boat in service 1935-1944

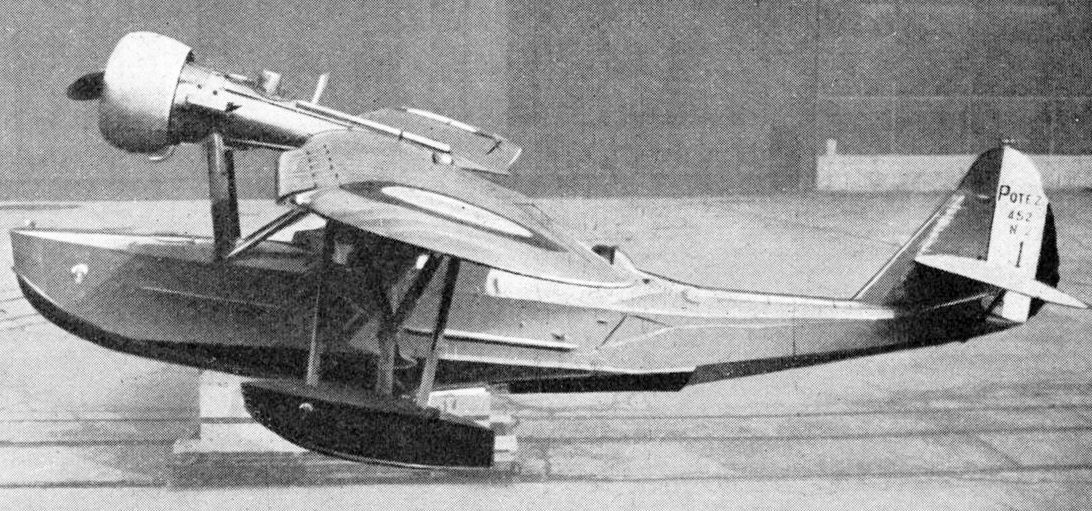
- Potez 452 prototype

General information
- Type: Naval reconnaissance aircraft
- Manufacturer: Potez
- Designer: M. Delaruelle
- Status: Retired
- Primary user: French Navy
- Number built: 16

History
- Introduction date: 1936
- First flight: 1935
- Retired: 1944

The Potez 452 was a French flying boat designed and built by Potez in response to a French Navy specification for a shipboard reconnaissance machine for use on its battleships and cruisers.

== Design ==
In 1930, the French Navy issued a specification for a small, two-seat seaplane, which was required to operate from French navy ships and carry out observation duties. The aircraft needed to have folding wings for storage aboard ship, and would be launchable by catapult. The specification resulted in proposals from Bodiansky (the Bodiansky 30), Chantiers Aéro-Maritimes de la Seine (the CAMS 90), Gourdou-Leseurre (the GL-831) and Levasseur (the Levasseur PL.12) as well as from Potez.

Potez's design, the Potez 45, which was produced by a team led by engineer M. Delaruelle, was a single-engine parasol monoplane flying boat of mixed wood and metal construction. The wings had an unswept centre-section and swept, folding outer sections, which were fitted with leading-edge slats. The engine nacelle was mounted on the front of the wing centre-section. The pilot and observer sat in separate cockpits in the hull.

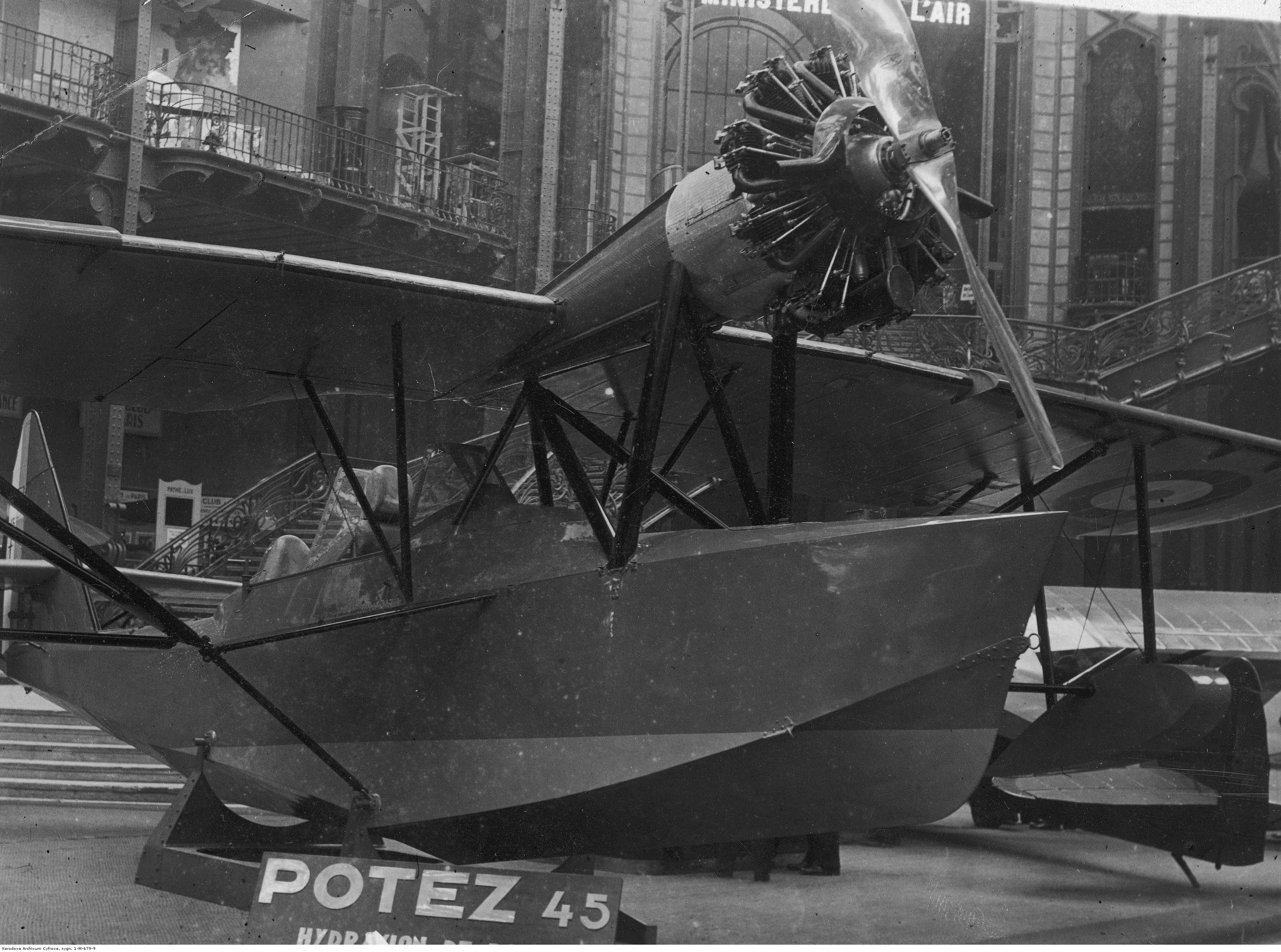
Potez 45 prototype

The prototype Potez 45, powered by a 230 hp (170 kW) Salmson 9AB radial engine, was completed in March 1932 and was sent to the Étang de Berre for testing, making its first flight in April that year. After initial testing, the aircraft's stabilizing floats were redesigned and moved further outboard on the wings. Thus modified, on 5 September, the aircraft was sent to Saint-Raphaël for official testing. Here, the Potez was criticised for its handling on the water, with the aircraft tending to dig into waves rather than skim over them, and was also considered underpowered. As a result, the prototype, has again modified, with the hull fitted with a lengthened nose to improve its performance on water, and the stabilizing floats modified again, while the engine was replaced by a Hispano-Suiza 9Qd (a license-built Wright R-975 Whirlwind) rated at 350 hp (260 kW). These changes were successful, and an order for 10 production aircraft, designated Potez 452 was placed in 1935, with six more aircraft ordered in October 1936.

The Spanish Navy also had a requirement for a replacement for its obsolete Macchi M.18s, and after testing in February 1936, Spain acquired a manufacturing license for the Potez, but the outbreak of the Spanish Civil War prevented any Spanish production.

On 1933, the French Navy issued a requirement for a seaplane fighter aircraft, to be capable of being catapulted from the navy's cruisers. Potez decided to respond with a single-seat derivative of the 452, the Potez 453, which competed against floatplanes from Bernard (the H.52), Loire (the 210) and Romano (the R.90). A supercharged 800 hp (600 kW) Hispano-Suiza 14Hbs radial engine replaced the Hispano-Suiza 9Qd, while the airframe was refined to reduce drag. Armament was two fixed forward-firing machine guns, with provision to add a cannon (which was never fitted). The prototype Potez 453 made its first flight on 24 September 1935. While the aircraft demonstrated a maximum speed of 335 km/h (208 mph; 181 kn), the high-mounted powerful engine on a small airframe caused a strong nose-down trim when at high power, making take-off difficult, and development was abandoned, with the Loire 210 winning the competition and reaching production.

== Operational history ==
The first 10 Potez 452s were delivered between December 1935 and February 1936, and were deployed aboard ships based in metropolitan France and France's far eastern colonies. Mixed detachments of Potez 452s and Gourdou-Leseurre GL-812 HY floatplanes were deployed aboard the battleship Lorraine and the cruisers La Galissonnière and Jean de Vienne, but these mixed detachments proved impracticable as the two different types of aircraft needed different catapult trolleys, and from mid-1936, the Potez 452 was dedicated to service in France's overseas colonies, serving on the cruiser Lamotte-Picquet and Bougainville-class avisos, with detachments alternating between Potezes and Gourdou-Leseurre GL-832 HYs.

Eleven Potez 452s remained in service at the start of the Second World War in September 1939. Largely based in France's colonies in Africa and Asia, Potez 452s took no part in the Battle of France in 1940, and after the French armistice with Germany of June 1940, continued operations with the Vichy French Three Potez 452s formed part of a seaplane unit formed in French Indochina and operating from Ream, Cambodia late in 1940, as tensions grew between France and Thailand, and supported the Vichy French Navy during the 1940–1941 Franco-Thai War. Two Potez 452s, stored at Port Lyautey in Morocco were destroyed by American air attack during Operation Torch, the Anglo-American invasion of French North Africa on 8 November 1942, and another was destroyed during the Scuttling of the French fleet at Toulon on 27 November. Indochina-based Potez 452s remained in use into 1944, with the last recorded flight on 7 September 1944. In 1937 a single Potez 452 had been supplied to the Imperial Japanese Navy Air Service for evaluation as the Potez HXP1.

== Variants ==
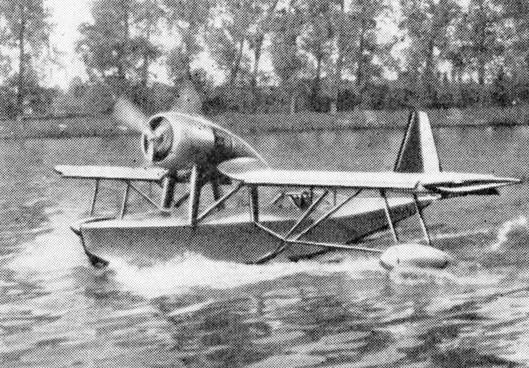
Potez 453 photo from L'Aerophile July 1936

Potez 450
Prototype flying-boat with a 170 kW (230 hp) Salmson 9Ab engine, one built
Potez 452
Production variant with a 260 kW (350 hp) Hispano-Suiza 9Qd engine, 48 built.
Potez 453
Floatplane fighter derived from the 452, powered by a 540 kW (720 hp) Hispano-Suiza 14Hbs. A single prototype was built, first flown on 24 September 1935.

== Operators ==
France

- French Navy

Vichy France

- Vichy French Air Force

== Specifications (Potez 452) ==
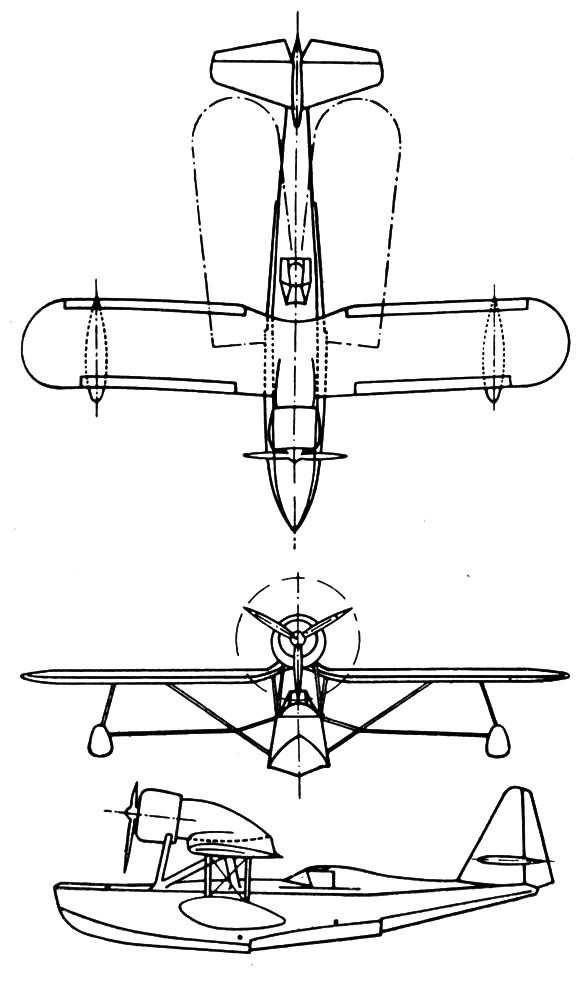
Potez 453 3-view drawing from L'Aerophile July 1936

Data from War Planes of the Second World War:Volume Five Flying Boats

General characteristics

- Crew: 2
- Length: 10.23 m (33 ft 6 3/4 in)
- Wingspan: 13.00 m (42 ft 7 5/8 in)
- Width: 5.37 m (17 ft 7 in) (wings folded)
- Height: 3.40 m (11 ft 1 7/8 in)
- Wing area: 24.30 m^{2} (261.6 sq ft)
- Empty weight: 1,102 kg (2,429 lb)
- Gross weight: 1,701 kg (3,751 lb) (catapult launch)
- Max takeoff weight: 1,750 kg (3,858 lb) (water takeoff)
- Powerplant: 1 × Hispano-Suiza 9Qd 9-cylinder air-cooled radial engine, 260 kW (350 hp)

Performance

- Maximum speed: 217 km/h (135 mph, 117 kn) at 2,000 m (6,560 ft)
- Cruise speed: 170 km/h (110 mph, 92 kn)
- Stall speed: 72 km/h (45 mph, 39 kn)
- Range: 500 km (310 mi, 270 nmi) at 2,000 m (6,600 ft) and 170 km/h (110 mph; 92 kn)
- Endurance: 5 hr 10 min
- Service ceiling: 5,500 m (18,040 ft)
- Time to altitude: 7 min 15 s to 2,000 m (6,560 ft)

Armament

- Guns: One 7.5 mm (0.295 inch) machine gun mounted in flexible position in rear cockpit

== See also ==
Related lists

- List of aircraft of World War II
- List of Interwar military aircraft
- List of flying boats and floatplanes

== Bibliography ==
- Bousquet, Gérard. French Flying Boats of WW II. Sandomierz, Poland: Stratus, 2013 ISBN 978-83-63678-06-7
- Cortet, Pierre (November 1993). "Courrier Lecteurs". Avions: Toute l'aéronautique et son histoire (in French). No. 9. pp. 28–30. ISSN 1243-8650.
- Green, William (1968). War Planes of the Second World War: Volume Five Flying Boats. London: Macdonald. ISBN 0-356-01449-5.
- Green, William; Swanborough, Gordon (1994). The Complete Book of Fighters. New York: Smithmark. ISBN 0-8317-3939-8.
- Ledet, Michel (September 1993). "Le Potez 452 (1^{ère} partie)" [The Potez 452 (Part 1)]. Avions: Toute l'aéronautique et son histoire (in French). No. 7. pp. 15–19. ISSN 1243-8650.
- Ledet, Michel (October 1993). "Le Potez 452, 2^{ème} partie" [The Potez 452, Part 2]. Avions: Toute l'aéronautique et son histoire (in French). No. 8. pp. 12–17. ISSN 1243-8650.
- Roux, Robert J. (June 1970). "Le chasseur Potez 453" [The Fighter Potez 453]. Le Album de Fanatique de l'Aviation (in French). No. 12. pp. 7–9. ISSN 0757-4169.
