= Canon de 138 mm Modèle 1927 =

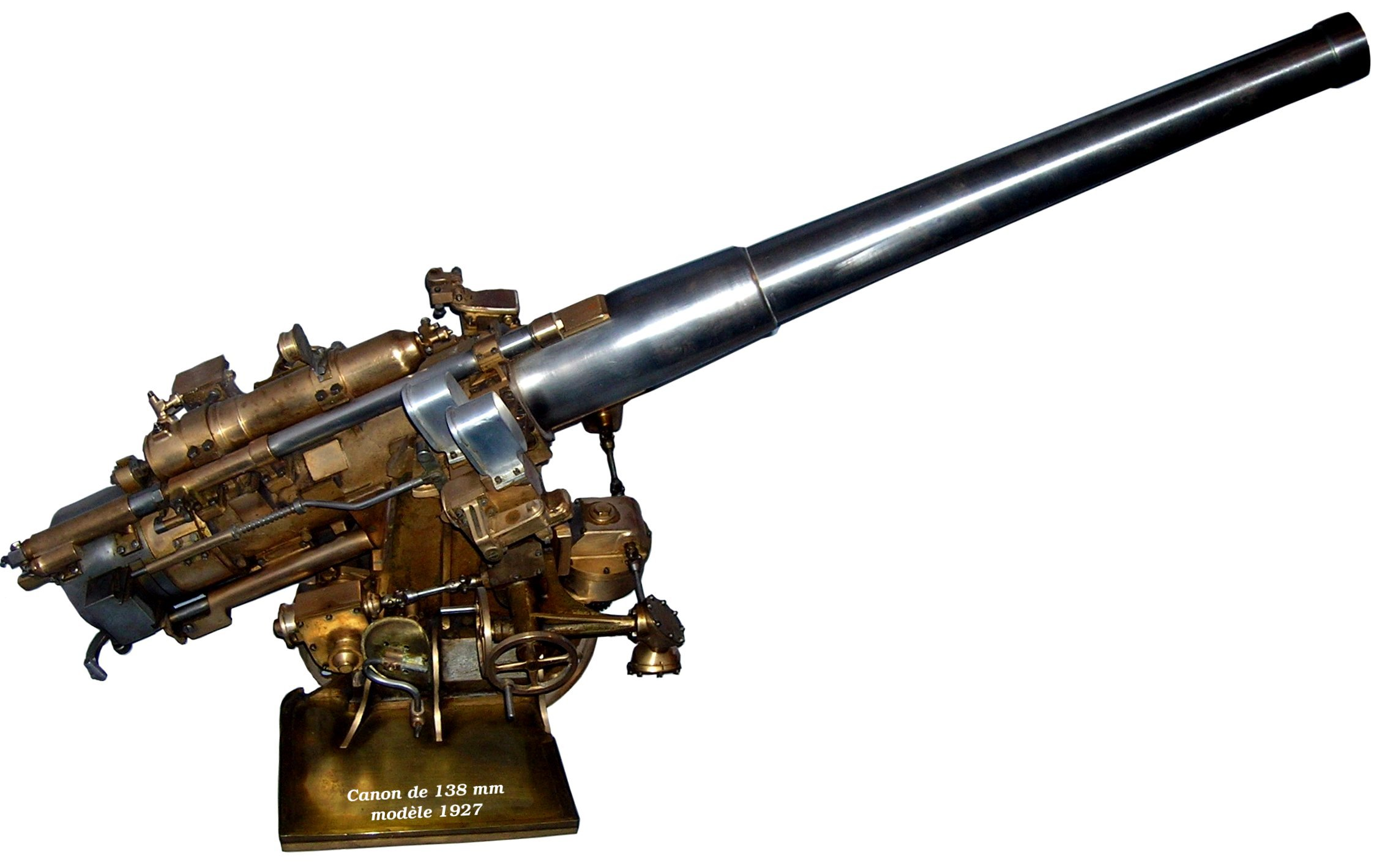
- Scale model of the Canon de 138 mm Modèle 1927 gun on display at the Musée national de la Marine
- Type: Naval gun
- Place of origin: France

Service history
- In service: 1927–1959
- Used by: France
- Wars: World War II

Specifications
- Mass: 4,100 kg (9,000 lb)
- Barrel length: about 5.544 m (18 ft 2.3 in)
- Shell: 130x900mm R Separate-loading, cased charge
- Shell weight: 40.6 kg (90 lb)
- Calibre: 138.6 mm (5.46 in)
- Breech: semi-automatic, horizontal sliding-block
- Elevation: -10° to +28°
- Traverse: approximately 300°
- Rate of fire: 8–10 rpm
- Muzzle velocity: 700 m/s (2,300 ft/s)
- Maximum firing range: 16,600 m (18,200 yd)

The Canon de 138 mm Modèle 1927 was a medium-calibre gun of the French Navy used during World War II. It was derived from a German World War I design. It was used on the destroyers of the Aigle and Vauquelin classes and the Bougainville-class sloops.

== Description ==
The 40-calibre Mle 1927 was derived from the German World War I 15 cm L/45 UToF gun as mounted on the large torpedo boat SMS S113 received by France as war reparations. It copied the German gun's semi-automatic action and its horizontal sliding-block breech. It had an autofretted, monobloc barrel. It used 8.967 kilograms (19.77 lb) of powder to push a 40.6-kilogram (90 lb) shell to a muzzle velocity of 700 metres per second (2,300 ft/s).

=== Mounting ===
The Mle 1927 was used in single centre-pivot mountings that weighed approximately 13 tonnes (13 long tons; 14 short tons) that were fitted with a 3-millimetre (0.12 in) thick gun shield. The mount could depress -10° and elevate to +28° which gave it a maximum range of 16,600 metres (18,200 yd). The gun had a firing cycle of 4 or 5 seconds with its automatic spring rammer, but the dredger hoists transporting the shells and cartridge cases slowed the rate of fire down to 8-10 rounds per minute.
