= Gourdou-Leseurre GL-832 HY =

GL-832 HY
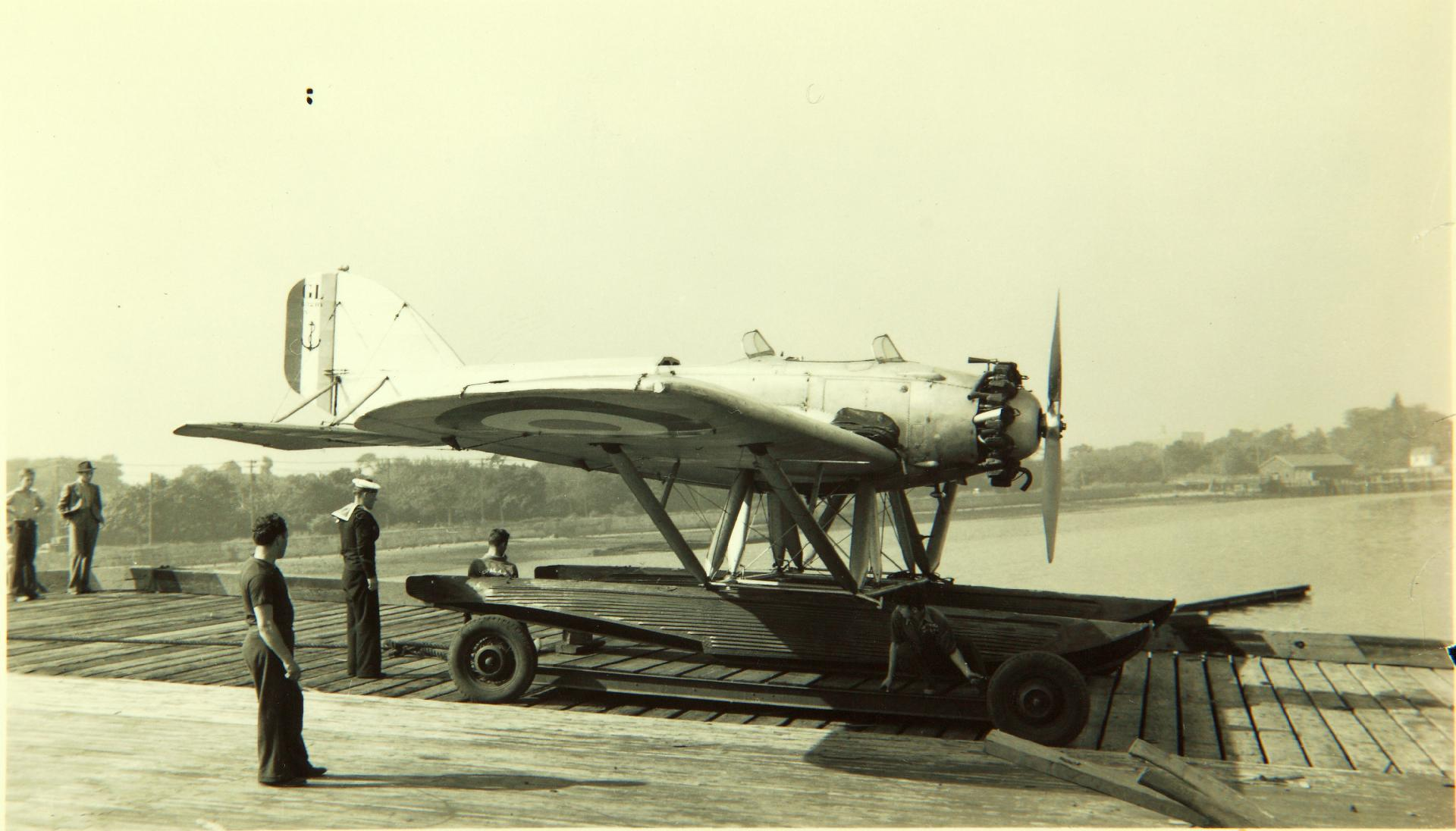

General information
- Type: Shipboard reconnaissance floatplane
- Manufacturer: Gourdou-Leseurre
- Primary user: French Navy
- Number built: 22

History
- Manufactured: 1934–1936
- Introduction date: 1934
- First flight: 1931
- Retired: 1941

The Gourdou-Leseurre GL-832 HY was a 1930s French light shipboard reconnaissance floatplane designed and built by Gourdou-Leseurre for the French Navy.

== Development ==
In 1930 the French Navy issued a requirement for a light coastal patrol seaplane mainly for use in the French colonies. Gourdou-Leseurre built and designed a prototype GL-831 HY which was a modification of the companies earlier GL-830 HY with a smaller Hispano-Suiza radial engine. The GL-831 HY first flew on 23 December 1931. In 1933 the French Navy ordered 22 aircraft designated GL-832 HY, this had a less powerful engine than the prototype. The GL-832 HY was a metal construction low-wing monoplane with fabric covered wings and twin floats. The aircraft had a large wing to take the stresses of a catapult launch, the wings also folded to allow stowage on board a ship. Unusually the braced-horizontal tailplane was attached to the underside of the rear fuselage. Two open cockpits in tandem were provided for the two crew, each cockpit having a windscreen. The first production aircraft flew on 17 December 1934 and the last on 12 February 1936.

== Operational history ==
The French Navy used the GL-832 HY on second-line cruisers like the Emile Bertin and Primauguet and on smaller colonial sloops. The smaller sloops did not have a catapult and the aircraft were lowered into the sea using a crane. The aircraft were still operational at the start of the Second World War and were not retired until 1941.

== Variants ==
GL-830 HY
Prototype with one 350hp (261 kW) Hispano-Suiza 9Qdr radial engine, one built.
GL-831 HY
Prototype with one 250 hp (186 kW) Hispano-Suiza 9Qa radial engine, one built.
GL-832 HY
Production version with one 230 hp (171 kW) Hispano-Suiza 9Qb radial engine, 22 built.

== Operators ==
France

- French Navy

== Specifications (GL-832 HY) ==
Data from The Illustrated Encyclopedia of Aircraft (Part Work 1982–1985), 1985, Orbis Publishing, Page 1994

General characteristics

- Crew: Two
- Length: 8.74 m (28 ft 8 in)
- Wingspan: 13 m (42 ft 7.75 in)
- Height: 3.48 m (11 ft 5 in)
- Wing area: 29.50 m^{2} (317.55 sq ft)
- Empty weight: 1,108 kg (2,443 lb)
- Gross weight: 1,696 kg (3,739 lb)
- Powerplant: 1 × Hispano-Suiza 9Qb 9-cylinder radial piston engine , 172 kW (230 hp)

Performance

- Maximum speed: 196 km/h (122 mph, 106 kn)
- Range: 590 km (367 mi, 319 nmi)
- Service ceiling: 5,000 m (16,405 ft)

Armament

- 1x 7.7mm (0.303 in) Vickers machine-gun on a flexible-mounting

== See also ==
Related lists

- List of aircraft of World War II
- List of flying boats and floatplanes
