= List of ship launches in 1931 =

The list of ship launches in 1931 includes a chronological list of ships launched in 1931.

Date	Ship	Class	Builder	Location	Country	Notes
22 January	Triona	Cargo ship	Harland & Wolff	Belfast	United Kingdom	For British Phosphate Carriers.
22 January	Ville de Tamatave	Steamship	Ateliers et Chantiers de la Seine-Maritime	Le Trait	France	For Cie. Havraise Péninsulaire
29 January	Commandant Reculoux	12 m 50 Lifeboat	Chantiers de la Rochelle	La Rochelle	France	For Soc. des Hospitaliers-Sauveteurs Bretons (Saint Malo)
3 February	Alabama	Cargo ship	Chantiers de Normandie	Le Grand-Quevilly	France	For Compagnie Générale Transatlantique
5 February	Autocarrier	Ferry	Harland & Wolff	Belfast	United Kingdom	For Southern Railway
19 February	Aigle	Aigle-class destroyer	Ateliers et Chantiers de France	Dunkirk	France	For French Navy.
28 February	Savarona	Passenger ship	Blohm + Voss	Hamburg	Weimar Republic	
5 March	Ogeni	Sternwheeler	Harland & Wolff	Belfast	United Kingdom	For Elder Dempster.
17 March	Monarch of Bermuda	Ocean liner	Vickers-Armstrongs Ltd.	Newcastle upon Tyne	United Kingdom	For Furness Withy.
29 March	Vauquelin	Vauquelin-class destroyer	Ateliers et Chantiers de France	Dunkirk	France	For French Navy.
1 April	Bideford	Shoreham-class sloop	Devonport Dockyard	Devonport	United Kingdom	For Royal Navy.
5 April	Chōkai	Takao-class cruiser	Mitsubishi	Nagasaki	Japan	For Imperial Japanese Navy.
17 April	Hilary	Cargo liner	Cammell Laird	Birkenhead	United Kingdom	For Booth Steamship Co.
14 May	Maréchal Joffre	Ocean liner	Soc. Provençale de Constructions Navales	La Ciotat	France	For Cie. des Messageries Maritimes
14 May	Cliona	Tanker	Harland & Wolff	Belfast	United Kingdom	For Anglo-Saxon Petroleum Co.
16 May	Lexia	Motor yacht	Berthon Boat Co. Ltd	Lymington	United Kingdom	For Thomas P. Rose-Richards.
19 May	Deutschland	Deutschland-class cruiser	Deutsche Werke	Kiel	Germany	For Reichsmarine.
19 May	Marcelle	Motor boat	Chantiers et Forges de la Hève	Le Havre	France	For: Soc. Hyproma
21 May	Maracay	Tanker	Harland & Wolff	Belfast	United Kingdom	For Lago Shipping Co.
18 June	Savorgnan de Brazza	Colinial Aviso	Chantiers MAritime du Sud Ouest	Bordeaux	France	For French Navy
June	I.W.C.661	Barge	Alabama Drydock and Shipbuilding Company	Mobile, Alabama	United States	For Inland Waterways Commission.
2 July	Conch	Tanker	Harland & Wolff	Belfast	United Kingdom	For Anglo-Saxon Petroleum Co.
16 July	Rochester	Shoreham-class sloop	Chatham Dockyard	Chatham	United Kingdom	For Royal Navy.
18 July	L'Espoir	Redoutable-class submarine	Arsenal de Cherbourg	Cherbourg	France	For French Navy.
18 July	Colombie	Ocean liner	Ateliers et Chantiers de France	Dunkirk	France	For Compagnie Generale Transatlantique
19 July	Ville de Majunga	Screw steamer	Chantiers de Seine-Maritime	Le Trait	France	For: Compagnie Havraise Péninsulaire
18 July	Strathaird		Vickers Shipbuilding and Engineering	Barrow-in-Furness	United Kingdom	For Peninsular and Oriental Steam Navigation Company.
14 August	Épervier	Aigle-class destroyer	Arsenal de Lorient	Lorient	France	For French Navy.
August	I.W.C. 662	Barge	Alabama Drydock and Shipbuilding Company	Mobile, Alabama	United States	For Inland Waterways Commission.
August	I.W.C. 663	Barge	Alabama Drydock and Shipbuilding Company	Mobile, Alabama	United States	For Inland Waterways Commission.
13 September	Courgain	Dredge spoil carrier	Forges et Chantiers de la Méditerranée	Le Havre	France	For: Ponts et Chaussées (Calais)
24 September	Leander	Leander-class cruiser	Devonport Dockyard	Devonport	United Kingdom	For Royal Navy.
29 September	Cygnet	C-class destroyer	Vickers Armstrong	Barrow-in-Furness	United Kingdom	For Royal Navy.
29 September	Crescent	C-class destroyer	Vickers Armstrong	Barrow-in-Furness	United Kingdom	For Royal Navy.
30 September	Comet	C-class destroyer	Portsmouth Dockyard	Portsmouth	United Kingdom	Royal Navy.
30 September	Crusader	C-class destroyer	Portsmouth Dockyard	Portsmouth	United Kingdom	For Royal Navy.
30 September	Luigi Cadorna	Condottieri-class cruiser	Cantieri Riuniti dell'Adriatico	Trieste	Italy	For Regia Marina.
September	I.W.C. 664	Barge	Alabama Drydock and Shipbuilding Company	Mobile, Alabama	United States	For Inland Waterways Commission.
10 October	Monterey	Ocean liner	Bethlehem Steel Co.	Quincy, Massachusetts	United States	For Matson Navigation Co.
11 October	Bout-Blanc	Dredge spoil carrier	Forges et Chantiers de la Méditerranée	Le Havre	France	For: Ponts et Chaussées (Rochelle)
13 October	Milan	Aigle-class destroyer	Arsenal de Lorient	Lorient	France	For French Navy.
13 October	Risban	Dredge spoil carrier	Forges et Chantiers de la Méditerranée	Le Havre	France	For: Ponts et Chaussées (Calais)
28 October	Conte di Savoia	Ocean liner	Cantieri Riuniti dell'Adriatico	Trieste	Italy	For Italian Line.
29 October	Kempenfelt	C-class destroyer	J. Samuel White	Cowes	United Kingdom	For Royal Navy
October	I.W.C. 665	Barge	Alabama Drydock and Shipbuilding Company	Mobile, Alabama	United States	For Inland Waterways Commission.
7 November	Indianapolis	Portland-class cruiser	New York Shipbuilding Corporation	Camden, New Jersey	United States	For United States Navy.
8 November	Cassard	Vauquelin-class destroyer	Ateliers et Chantiers de Bretagne	Nantes	France	For French Navy.
9 November	Maillé Brézé	Vauquelin-class destroyer	Ateliers et Chantiers de Saint-Nazaire Penhoët	Saint-Nazaire	France	For French Navy.
12 November	Georgic	Ocean liner	Harland & Wolff	Belfast	United Kingdom	For White Star Line.
14 November	Kersaint	Vauquelin-class destroyer	Ateliers et Chantiers de la Loire	Saint-Nazaire	France	For French Navy.
November	I.W.C. 666	Barge	Alabama Drydock and Shipbuilding Company	Mobile, Alabama	United States	For Inland Waterways Commission.
5 December	Pola	Zara-class cruiser	OTO Livorno	Livorno	Italy	For Regia Marina.
7 December	Tartu	Vauquelin-class destroyer	Ateliers et Chantiers de la Loire	Saint-Nazaire	France	For French Navy.
9 December	Saint Marc	Dredge spoil carrier	Forges et Chantiers de la Méditerranée	Le Havre	France	For: Ponts et Chaussées (Rochelle)
10 December	Highland Patriot	Passenger ship	Harland & Wolff	Belfast	United Kingdom	For Nelson Steamship Co.
15 December	Manhattan	Ocean liner	New York Shipbuilding	Camden, New Jersey	United States	
23 December	Lightship No. 87	Lightship	Harland & Wolff	Belfast	United Kingdom	For Trinity House.
December	I.W.C. 667	Barge	Alabama Drydock and Shipbuilding Company	Mobile, Alabama	United States	For Inland Waterways Commission.
Unknown date	Avon Queen	Motor barge	Abdela & Mitchell Ltd.	Brimscombe	United Kingdom	For Francis & Niblett.
Unknown date	Flathouse	Collier	Swan, Hunter & Wigham Richardson Ltd.	Southwick	United Kingdom	For Stephenson Clarke.
Unknown date	Hoedic	Tug	Cochrane & Son Ltd.	Selby	United Kingdom	For Compagnie Nazairienne de Remorquage et de Sauvetage.
Unknown date	John Hickman	Barge	Isaac J. Abdela & Mitchell (1925) Ltd.	Queensferry	United Kingdom	For Spillers Ltd.
Unknown date	Mariposa	Ocean Liner	Bethlehem Shipbuilding Corporation	Quincy, Massachusetts	United States	For Matson Line.
Unknown date	Skylark 8	Motor vessel	J. Bolson & Son Ltd.	Poole	United Kingdom	For J. Bolson & Son Ltd.
