= Forces de haute mer =

The Forces de haute mer (High Sea Force) was an organization of the Marine Nationale (French Navy) formed from the Mediterranean Fleet shortly before the German invasion of Poland in September 1939. It was reformed after the French signed armistices with Germany and with Italy after losing the Battle of France in June 1940. The rump of France not occupied by Germany and Italy became known as Vichy France and the victors agreed to allow it to use the navy's surviving ships subject to strict limitations.

== History ==
It was founded at Toulon on 25 September 1940 by agreement with the Italian and German Armistice Commissions. The Germans and Italians imposed strict limits on the number of Vichy ships that were allowed to be in commission and training. All other ships, with the exception of those based overseas or assigned to local defense, were required to be placed in reserve (en gardiennage d'armistice). Fuel shortages generally limited the FHM to one major training sortie per month. Ships would generally rotate in and out of reserve to receive refits or modernizations.

Admiral Jean de Laborde came out of retirement to lead the FHM.

== Order of battle, 25 September 1940 ==
On formation, the unit consisted of:

- Strasbourg, the flagship
- 1^{ère} Escadre de croiseurs (1st Cruiser Squadron)
  - 1^{ère} Division de croiseurs (1st Cruiser Division)
    - Algérie
    - Foch
    - Dupleix
  - 3^{e} Division de croiseurs (3rd Cruiser Division)
    - Marseillaise
    - La Galissonnière
- 3^{e} Escadre Légère (3rd Light Squadron)
  - 3^{e} Division de contre-torpilleurs (3rd Destroyer Division)
    - Guépard
    - Valmy
    - Cassard
  - 7^{e} Division de contre-torpilleurs (7th Destroyer Division)
    - Vautour
    - Albatros
    - Gerfaut
  - 10^{e} Division de contre-torpilleurs (10th Destroyer Division)
    - L'Indomptable
    - Volta

== Order of battle, 1 November 1942 ==
Shortly before the German occupation of Vichy France, the unit consisted of:

- Strasbourg, the flagship
- 1^{ère} Escadre de croiseurs (1st Cruiser Squadron)
  - 1^{ère} Division de croiseurs (1st Cruiser Division)
    - Algérie
    - Colbert
    - Dupleix
  - 3^{e} Division de croiseurs (3rd Cruiser Division)
    - Marseillaise
    - Jean de Vienne
- 3^{e} Escadre Légère (3rd Light Squadron)
  - 3^{e} Division de contre-torpilleurs (3rd Destroyer Division)
    - Guépard
    - Verdun
  - 6^{e} Division de contre-torpilleurs (6th Destroyer Division)
    - Tartu
    - Vauquelin
    - Kersaint
  - 7^{e} Division de contre-torpilleurs (7th Destroyer Division)
    - Vautour
    - Cassard
    - Gerfaut
  - 10^{e} Division de contre-torpilleurs (10th Destroyer Division)
    - L'Adroit
    - Mameluk
    - Casque
