= French cruiser Dupleix (1930) =

Suffren-class cruiser

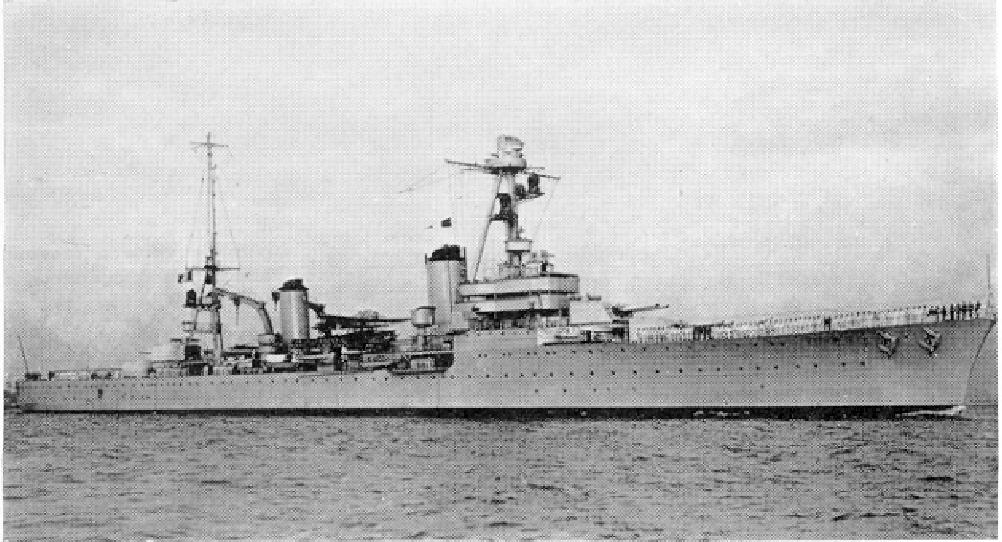
- Dupleix

History

France
- Name: Dupleix
- Namesake: Joseph François Dupleix
- Ordered: 1 April 1929
- Builder: Arsenal de Brest
- Laid down: 14 November 1929
- Launched: 9 October 1930
- Completed: 20 July 1932
- Commissioned: 1 May 1932
- In service: 15 November 1933
- Out of service: 27 November 1942
- Fate: Scuttled at Toulon, 27 November 1942, Scrapped 1951

General characteristics
- Class & type: Suffren-class cruiser
- Displacement: 10,160 t (10,000 long tons) (standard)
- Length: 194 m (636.48 ft)
- Beam: 19.26 m (63.19 ft)
- Draught: 6.57 m (21.56 ft)
- Installed power: 6 boilers
- Propulsion: 3 geared steam turbines
- Speed: 32 knots (59 km/h; 37 mph) (designed)
- Range: 5,300 nautical miles (9,800 km; 6,100 mi) at 15 knots (28 km/h; 17 mph)
- Complement: 773
- Armament: Initial; 8 × 203 mm (8.0 in)/50 guns (4 × 2); 8 × 90 mm (3.5 in)/50 AA guns (4 × 2); 6 × 37 mm (1.5 in) light AA guns (6 × 1); 16 × 13.2 mm (0.52 in) AA machine guns (4 × 4); 6 × 550 mm (22 in) torpedo tubes (2 × 3); 1941 refit; 8 × 203 mm (8.0 in)/50 guns (4 × 2); 8 × 90 mm (3.5 in)/50 AA guns (4 × 2); 14 × 37 mm (1.5 in) light AA guns (4 × 2, 6 × 1); 36 × 13.2 mm (0.52 in) AA machine guns (8 × 4, 2 × 2); 3 × 8 mm (0.31 in) AA machine guns (3 × 1); 6 × 550 mm (22 in) torpedo tubes (2 × 3)
- Armour: Caisson: 60 mm (2.4 in) sides and 30 mm (1.2 in) deck over machinery spaces; Deck: 25 mm (0.98 in); Turrets and conning tower: 30 mm (1.2 in); Magazine box 60 mm (2.4 in) sides with 30 mm (1.2 in) crowns; Steering gear: 26 mm (1.0 in) sides and 18 mm (0.71 in) roof
- Aircraft carried: 3 GL-810 then Loire-Nieuport 130
- Aviation facilities: 2 catapults

Dupleix was the fourth unit of the Suffren class. She entered service in 1933 and spent the interwar period in the Mediterranean. She participated in the International Patrol during the Spanish Civil War. September 1939 found her still in Toulon. She participated in the search for the Graf Spee in the Atlantic before returning to Toulon. The only time she fired her guns in conflict was during the bombardment of Vado, Italy in mid-June 1940. She was at Toulon at the time of the Franco-German Armistice in June 1940. She remained at Toulon until the French fleet there was scuttled in late November 1942. She was subsequently raised by the Italians in 1943.

She was named in honour of Joseph François, Marquis Dupleix (1697 - 1763) a French trader in the service of La Compagnie des Indes. He travelled between North America and India. In 1742, He was appointed Governor-General of French India, a post he held until his death in 1763.

== Design and description ==
With the Italians building the Condottieri class light cruiser to counter the large contre-torpillieurs, the General Staff decided this vessel should be immune to 155 mm (6.1 in) shell fire at 18,000 metres (19,685.04 yards). She would have the same protection layout as Foch however the thickness of the armour would be increased. Her high angle directors would be fitted abreast of the fore funnel and would revert to the same style of tripod mast as Suffren and Colbert. She would have trainable 5 meter range finders fitted to Turrets II and III. She was to have four quad 13.2 mm machineguns fitted on the bridge structure but it is unclear if they were ever fitted. Her secondary armament was the same as Foch, however these weapons were fitted in twin 1930 mounts rather than 1926 single mounts.

She was to be ordered under the 1928 tranche but due to a bottleneck at the ship yard at Brest she was not ordered until 1 April 1929. Also she was not laid down until 14 November. She was launched on 9 October 1930 and commenced her fitting out. Her construction continued more slowly than her sisters. She commenced her sea trials on 1 October 1931 with her acceptance trials following on 1 December. She was commissioned on 5 May 1932 though not complete until 20 July that year.

== Service history ==
=== Pre war service ===
She entered service on 15 November 1933 being assigned to the First Light Division of the First Squadron at Toulon. On 27 June 1935 she was in attendance of a Naval Review at the Bay of Douranenez. In 1935 the Marine Nationale co-operated with a film company for the production of Veille d'armes, directed by Marcel L'Herbier, a romantic melodrama about a captain in the French Navy. The cruiser Dupleix was made available for location shooting in and around its base in Toulon, and L'Herbier sought to incorporate into the drama as much detail as possible about the ship and its procedures.

In April 1937 the First Light Division was reformed as the First Cruiser Division with Dupleix, Colbert and Algérie. During 1937 she underwent a major refit then returned to Toulon.

=== War service ===
On the outbreak of war in September 1939 she was at Toulon with the other five treaty cruisers. On 14 October she was deployed with Algérie to Dakar, Senegal as part of La Marine Nationale's Force X to hunt German surface raiders and merchantmen. The two cruisers were designated Force M by the British based at Dakar. On 25 October with the contre-toppilleurs Le Fantasque and Le Terrible intercepted and captured the German merchantman Santa Fe. Upon the arrival of Foch, Strasbourg and Algérie returned to France as Force Y. On 7 December she sailed with the cruiser Foch, the British cruiser Neptune, the British carrier Hermes and two contre torpilleurs, Milan and Cassard. The ships were informed of the engagement off the River Plate when they were 850 nm from Pernambuco. They returned to Dakar to refuel so they could better place themselves if Admiral Graf Spee escaped to the sea. Force X again sortied from Dakar on 30 December, returning on 5 January 1940. She departed Dakar for the last time on 23 January with the cruiser Foch to escort a convoy from Bermuda to Morocco. Both ships then returned to Toulon.

On the night of 13/14 June she participated in Operation Vado, the bombardment of Genoa and Vado, Italy by the Third Squadron. The Vado Group included the cruisers Foch and Algérie and the Genoa Group included the cruisers Dupleix and Colbert. The bombardment cause little damage as Group Genoa fired at the wrong target and half of Group Vado shells fell into the sea. The squadron returned to Toulon by mid-day on 14 June. Foch suffered a steering malfunction but returned safely. On 25 June the Franco-German Armistice took effect and La Marine National ceased all offensive operations. With continued British action around Dakar, the Vichy French had scheduled for 22 September 1940 to send the cruisers Algérie, Foch, Dupleix, Marseillaise and La Galissonnière plus three contre torpilleurs and two fleet torpedo boats to Dakar as reinforcements. The plan was vetoed by the Germans on 20 September.

On 1 January 1941 Dupleix was reduced to care and maintenance being replaced by Colbert in the First Cruiser Division. She was reactivated on 4 October replacing Foch. Following the Torch landings in North Africa, the Germans invaded the unoccupied zone of France on 11 November 1942. The FHM was ready to sail to North Africa to defend it from the Torch landings but was denied permission to sail. By 27 November the Germans had reached Toulon and entered the base. The Germans were delayed from entering the naval dockyard giving the French sailors time to scuttle the fleet. Dupleix was tied up in the Missiessy Basin. The Germans boarded the ship and forced the crew below to close the sea cocks and condensers before the ship sank. The guns had been destroyed by explosive charges and a fire took hold in the ship. The fire was punctuated by numerous explosions. Dupleix burned until 6 December. Dupleix was refloated on 3 July 1943 by the Italians. In March 1944 she was hit by bombs during an American air attack and she was sunk again. She was scrapped in situ in 1951.

== Bibliography ==
- Jordan, John & Moulin, Jean (2013). French Cruisers 1922–1956. Seaforth Publishing. ISBN 978-1-84832-133-5.
- McMurtrie, Francis E. (1940). Jane's Fighting Ships 1940. Sampson Low, Marston & Company, Ltd.
- Saibène, Marc (n.d.). Toulon et la Marine 1942–1944. Marines Editions et Realisations.
- Whitley, M. J. (1995). Cruisers of World War Two: An International Encyclopedia. Naval Institute Press. ISBN 1-55750-141-6.
