= French destroyer Kersaint (1931) =

French Vauquelin-class destroyer

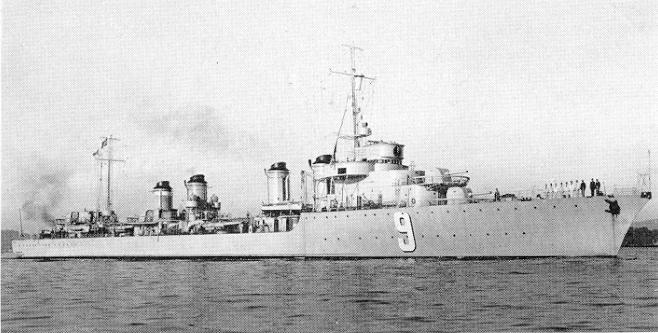
- Kersaint about 1934–1936

History

France
- Name: Kersaint
- Namesake: Guy François de Kersaint
- Ordered: 1 February 1930
- Builder: Chantiers Navals Français, Caen; Ateliers et Chantiers de la Loire, Saint-Nazaire
- Laid down: 19 September 1930
- Launched: 14 November 1931
- Completed: 31 December 1933
- Commissioned: 20 September 1933
- In service: 14 January 1934
- Fate: Scuttled, 27 November 1942

General characteristics
- Class & type: Vauquelin-class destroyer
- Displacement: 2,441 t (2,402 long tons) (standard); 3,120 t (3,070 long tons) (deep load)
- Length: 129.3 m (424 ft 3 in)
- Beam: 11.8 m (38 ft 9 in)
- Draft: 4.97 m (16 ft 4 in)
- Installed power: 4 du Temple boilers; 64,000 PS (47,000 kW; 63,000 shp)
- Propulsion: 2 shafts; 2 geared steam turbines
- Speed: 36 knots (67 km/h; 41 mph)
- Range: 3,000 nmi (5,600 km; 3,500 mi) at 14 knots (26 km/h; 16 mph)
- Crew: 12 officers, 224 crewmen (wartime)
- Armament: 5 × single 138.6 mm (5.5 in) guns; 4 × single 37 mm (1.5 in) anti-aircraft guns; 2 × twin 13.2 mm (0.52 in) anti-aircraft machineguns; 1 × triple, 2 × twin 550 mm (21.7 in) torpedo tubes; 2 chutes and 2 throwers for 36 depth charges; 40 mines

Kersaint was one of six Vauquelin-class destroyers (contre-torpilleurs) built for the French Navy (Marine Nationale) during the 1930s. The ship entered service in 1934 and spent most of her career in the Mediterranean. During the Spanish Civil War of 1936–1939, she was one of the ships that helped to enforce the non-intervention agreement. When France declared war on Germany in September 1939, all of the Vauquelins were assigned to the High Sea Forces (Forces de haute mer (FHM)) which was tasked to escort French convoys and support the other commands as needed. Kersaint helped to protect a group of freighters in the Atlantic once, but otherwise remained in the Mediterranean for the duration of the war.

The Vichy French reformed the FHM after the French surrender in June. Kersaint was present when the Royal Navy attacked the ships in French Algeria in July to prevent them from being turned over to the Germans, but managed to escape. The ship was in reserve until she was activated in mid-1941. Kersaint was scuttled in Toulon when the Germans occupied Vichy France in November 1942. The ship was not significantly salvaged during the war and her wreck was broken up in 1950.

== Design and description ==
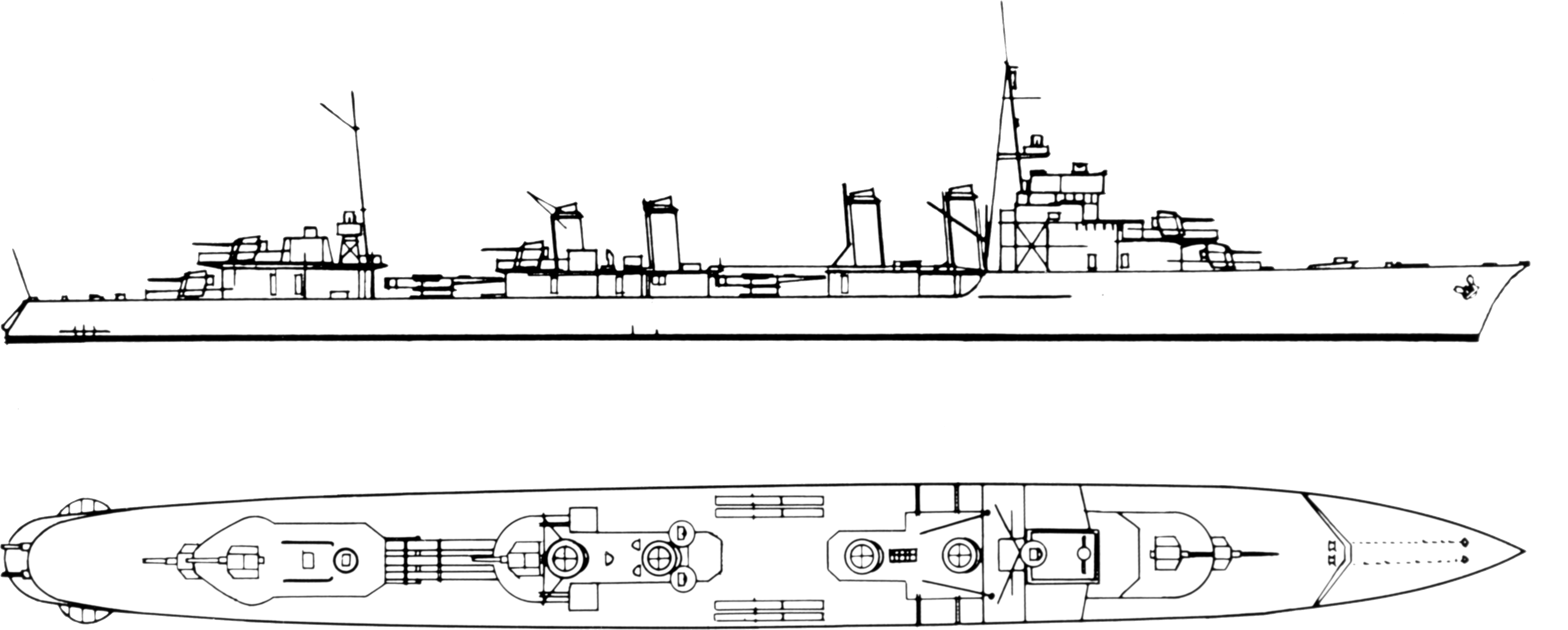
Right elevation and plan of the Vauquelin class

The Vauquelin-class ships were designed as improved versions of the preceding Aigle-class destroyers. They had an overall length of 129.3 meters (424 ft 3 in), a beam of 11.8 meters (38 ft 9 in), and a draft of 4.97 meters (16 ft 4 in). The ships displaced 2,441 metric tons (2,402 long tons) at standard and 3,120 metric tons (3,070 long tons) at deep load. They were powered by two geared Rateau-Breguet steam turbines, each driving one propeller shaft, using steam provided by four du Temple boilers. The turbines were designed to produce 64,000 metric horsepower (47,000 kW; 63,000 shp), which would propel the ships at 36 knots (67 km/h; 41 mph). During her sea trials on 28 July 1933, Kersaint's turbines provided 70,997 PS (52,218 kW; 70,026 shp) and she reached 38.4 knots (71.1 km/h; 44.2 mph) for a single hour. The ships carried enough fuel oil to give them a range of 3,000 nautical miles (5,600 km; 3,500 mi) at 14 knots (26 km/h; 16 mph). Their crew consisted of 10 officers and 201 crewmen in peacetime and 12 officers and 220 enlisted men in wartime.

The main armament of the Vauquelin-class ships consisted of five 138.6-millimeter (5.5 in) Modèle 1927 guns in single shielded mounts, one superfiring pair fore and aft of the superstructure and the fifth gun abaft the aft funnel. Their anti-aircraft armament consisted of four 37-millimeter (1.5 in) Modèle 1927 guns in single mounts positioned amidships and two twin mounts for 13.2-millimeter (0.52 in) Hotchkiss Modèle 1929 anti-aircraft machineguns on the forecastle deck abreast the bridge. The ships carried two above-water twin mounts for 550-millimeter (21.7 in) torpedo tubes, one pair on each broadside between the pairs of funnels as well as one triple mount aft of the rear pair of funnels. A pair of depth charge chutes were built into their stern; these housed a total of sixteen 200-kilogram (440 lb) depth charges, with eight more in reserve. They were also fitted with a pair of depth-charge throwers, one on each broadside abreast the aft funnels, for which they carried a dozen 100-kilogram (220 lb) depth charges. The ships could be fitted with rails to drop 40 Breguet B4 530-kilogram (1,170 lb) mines.

=== Modifications ===
The depth-charge throwers were removed in 1936 and more 200-kilogram depth charges were carried in their place. The ship's Hotchkiss machineguns were repositioned in front of the bridge in early 1939. Kersaint was fitted with a British Alpha 128 ASDIC system in April 1940. The Navy reconsidered its anti-submarine warfare tactics after the war began in September and eventually reinstated the pair of depth-charge throwers, although these were an older model than the one previously installed. As an interim measure, a pair of rails were installed on the stern for 35-kilogram (77 lb) depth charges. Each rail could accommodate three depth charges and ten more were stored in the magazine. The ship received her intended depth charge throwers during her May–June 1941 refit. At the same time, her anti-aircraft suite was augmented when the aft superstructure was remodeled and the mainmast was removed to accommodate three 25-millimeter (1 in) Hotchkiss Modèle 1925 AA guns in single mounts and a pair of Browning 13.2-millimeter AA machineguns, also in single mounts.

== Construction and career ==
Kersaint, named after Guy François de Kersaint, was ordered on 1 February 1930 from Ateliers et Chantiers de la Loire (ACL) as part of the 1929 Naval Program. To keep the workers at Chantiers Navals Français steadily employed, the ship's hull was ordered from that company's Caen shipyard. It was laid down on 19 September 1930 and launched on 14 November 1931. The incomplete ship was then towed to ACL's shipyard in Saint-Nazaire to be completed. She was commissioned on 20 September 1933 and entered service on 14 January 1934. Her entry into service was delayed for several months by problems with her gearboxes and with one of her turbines.

When the Vauquelins entered service they were assigned to the 5th and the newly formed 6th Light Divisions (Division légère (DL)) which were later redesignated as scout divisions (Division de contre-torpilleurs). Kersaint and her sister ships Vauquelin and Maillé Brézé were assigned to the 6th DL of the 2nd Light Squadron (2^{e} Escadre légère of the 2nd Squadron (2^{e} Escadre), based in Brest. The 6th DL was transferred to the group of large destroyers (Groupe de contre-torpilleurs (GCT) of the 1st Squadron (1^{e} Escadre) in Toulon in October 1934 and it was renumbered as the 9th. On 27 June 1935, all of the Vauquelins, except Cassard, participated in a naval review conducted by the Navy Minister (Ministre de la Marine) François Piétri in the Baie de Douarnenez after combined maneuvers by the 1st and 2nd Squadrons.

After the start of the Spanish Civil War in July 1936, Kersaint and Cassard were among the ships assigned to evacuate French citizens from Spain on 22 July and later to patrol the surveillance zones assigned to France. After 24 September most of the contre-torpilleurs and destroyers in the Mediterranean were assigned these tasks on a monthly rotation as part of the non-intervention policy. The GCT reverted to its previous designation of the 3rd Light Squadron on 15 September. As of 1 October Kersaint, Maillé Brézé and Cassard were assigned to the 9th DL while Vauquelin, Tartu and Chevalier Paul belonged to the 5th, both of which were assigned to the Mediterranean Squadron as the 1st Squadron was now known. The 9th DL participated in a naval review held by the Navy Minister Alphonse Gasnier-Duparc in Brest on 27 May 1937. The following year the Mediterranean Squadron cruised the Eastern Mediterranean in May–June 1938; the squadron was redesignated at the Mediterranean Fleet (Flotte de la Méditerranée) on 1 July 1939.

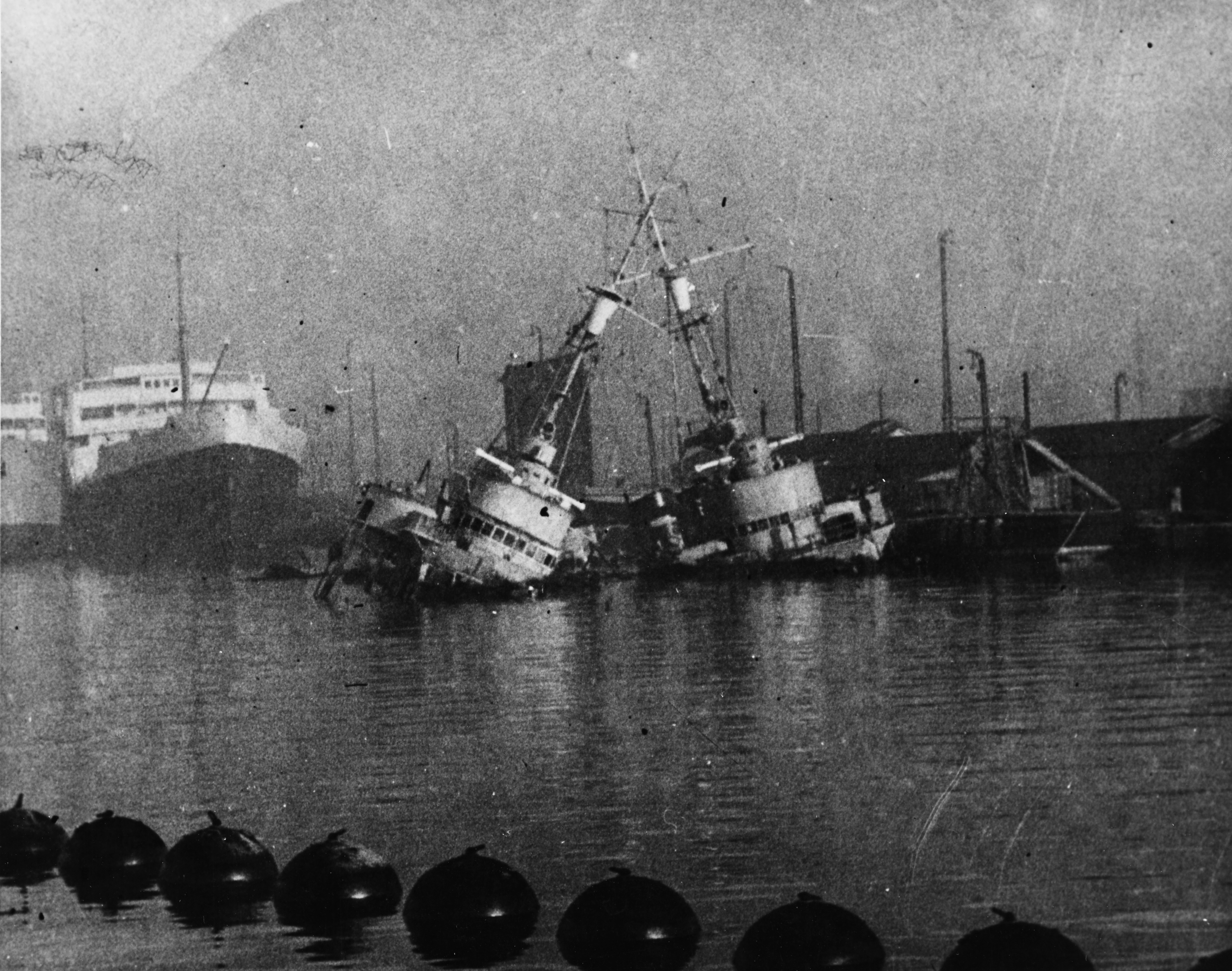
Vauquelin (left) and Kersaint scuttled in Toulon, 27 November 1942

On 27 August, in anticipation of war with Nazi Germany, the French Navy planned to reorganize the Mediterranean Fleet into the Forces de haute mer of three squadrons. When France declared war on 3 September, the reorganization was ordered and the 3rd Light Squadron, which included the 5th and 9th Scout Divisions with all of the Vauquelin-class ships, was assigned to the 3rd Squadron. The squadron transferred to Oran, French Algeria, on 3 September and the ships of the 9th Scout Division were assigned to escort duties in the Western Mediterranean in early October. On 22 December Kersaint, Maillé Brézé and the large destroyers Albatros, Vauban and Bison rendezvoused with Force Z, the battleship Lorraine and the light cruisers Jean de Vienne and Marseillaise, which was escorting four cargo ships loaded with American aircraft to Casablanca, French Morocco. A few days before the French surrender on 22 June, Kersaint escorted the seaplane carrier Commandant Teste from Toulon to Oran, despite being only able to steam on one propeller shaft, and then proceeded to nearby Mers-el-Kébir. The ship was present when the British attacked the fleet in the port on 3 July lest the ships be turned over to the Germans, but managed to escape to Toulon without damage, even though her maximum speed on one shaft was only 20 knots (37 km/h; 23 mph).

The Vichy French government reestablished the Forces de haute mer (FHM) on 25 September after it negotiated rules limiting the force's activities and numbers with the Italian and German Armistice Commissions. Kersaint was in reserve until she was assigned to the FHM on 15 June 1941 and assigned to the 7th Scout Division. The ship was transferred to Algiers, French Algeria, in early December to prepare to escort the damaged battleship Dunkerque back to Toulon in February 1942. After the Allies invaded French North Africa on 8 November, the Germans attempted to capture the French ships in Toulon intact on 27 November, but the ship was scuttled by her crew. Kersaint settled to the harbor bottom and took on a list. Little effort was made to salvage her and her wreck was broken up in place in 1950.
