= French ship Vautour =

At least three ships of the French Navy have borne the name Vautour:

- French lugger Vautour, a lugger which fought in the Algeciras campaign
- French cruiser Vautour, a Condor-class cruiser launched in 1889 and stricken in 1908
- French destroyer Vautour, an Aigle-class destroyer launched in 1930 and sunk in 1944
