= French destroyer Cassard (1931) =

French Vauquelin-class destroyer

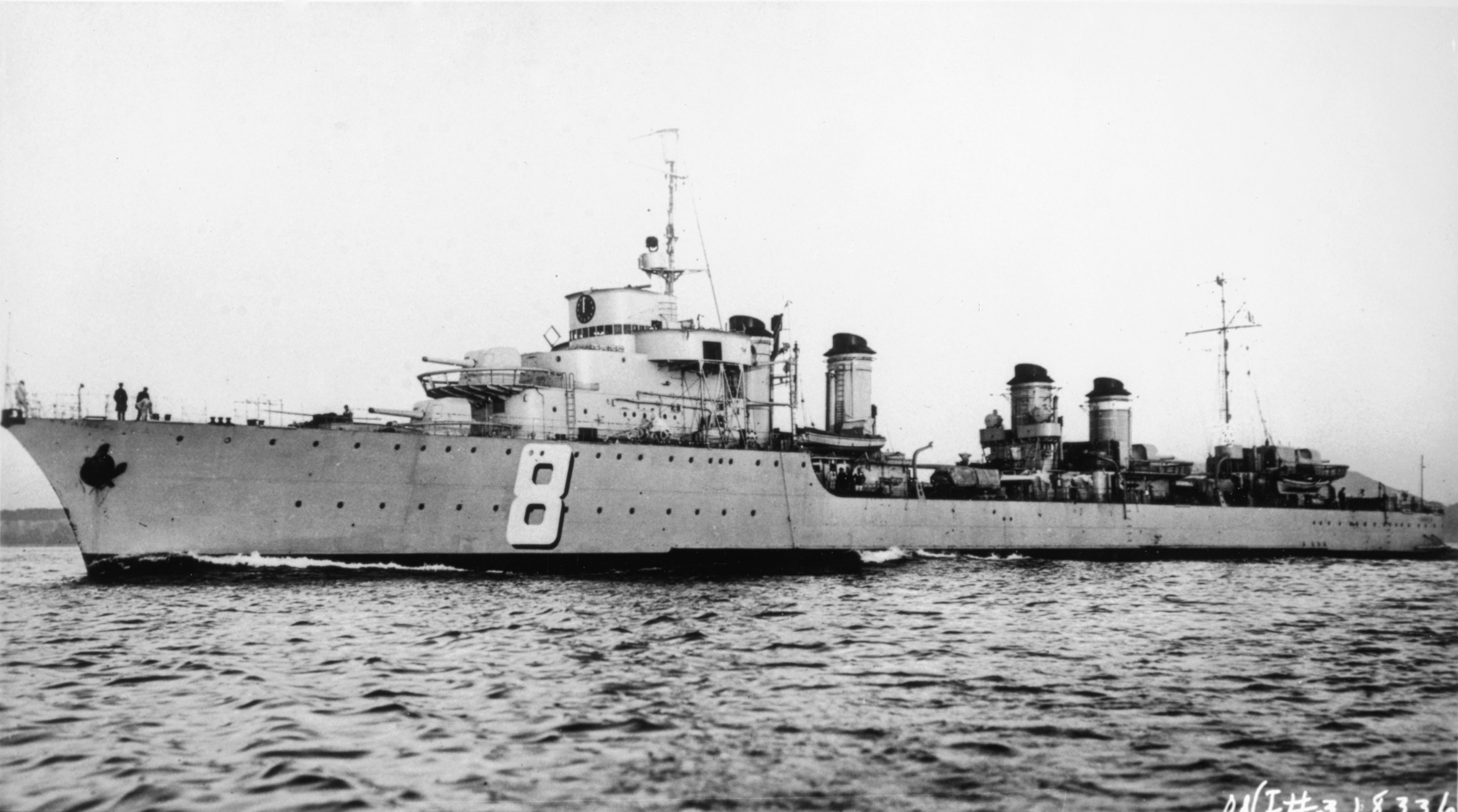
- Sister ship Vauquelin, about 1934

History

France
- Name: Cassard
- Namesake: Jacques Cassard
- Ordered: 1 February 1930
- Builder: Ateliers et Chantiers de Bretagne, Nantes
- Laid down: 12 November 1930
- Launched: 8 November 1931
- Completed: 10 September 1933
- Commissioned: 1 November 1932
- In service: 7 October 1933
- Fate: Scuttled, 27 November 1942

General characteristics
- Class & type: Vauquelin-class destroyer
- Displacement: 2,441 t (2,402 long tons) (standard); 3,120 t (3,070 long tons) (deep load)
- Length: 129.3 m (424 ft 3 in)
- Beam: 11.8 m (38 ft 9 in)
- Draft: 4.97 m (16 ft 4 in)
- Installed power: 4 du Temple boilers; 64,000 PS (47,000 kW; 63,000 shp)
- Propulsion: 2 shafts; 2 geared steam turbines
- Speed: 36 knots (67 km/h; 41 mph)
- Range: 3,000 nmi (5,600 km; 3,500 mi) at 14 knots (26 km/h; 16 mph)
- Crew: 12 officers, 224 crewmen (wartime)
- Armament: 5 × single 138.6 mm (5.5 in) guns; 4 × single 37 mm (1.5 in) AA guns; 2 × twin 13.2 mm (0.52 in) AA machine guns; 1 × triple, 2 × twin 550 mm (21.7 in) torpedo tubes; 2 chutes and 2 throwers for 36 depth charges; 40 mines

The French destroyer Cassard was one of six Vauquelin-class destroyers (contre-torpilleurs) built for the French Navy during the 1930s. The ship entered service in 1933 and spent most of her career in the Mediterranean. During the Spanish Civil War of 1936–1939, she was one of the ships that helped to enforce the non-intervention agreement. When France declared war on Germany in September 1939, all of the Vauquelins were assigned to the High Sea Forces (Forces de haute mer (FHM)) which was tasked to escort French convoys and support the other commands as needed. Cassard was briefly deployed to search for German commerce raiders and blockade runners in late 1939 and early 1940, but returned to the Mediterranean in time to participate in Operation Vado, a bombardment of Italian coastal facilities after Italy entered the war in June.

The Vichy French reformed the FHM after the French surrender in June. The ship was scuttled in Toulon when the Germans occupied Vichy France in November 1942. She was not significantly salvaged during the war and her wreck was broken up in 1950.

== Design and description ==
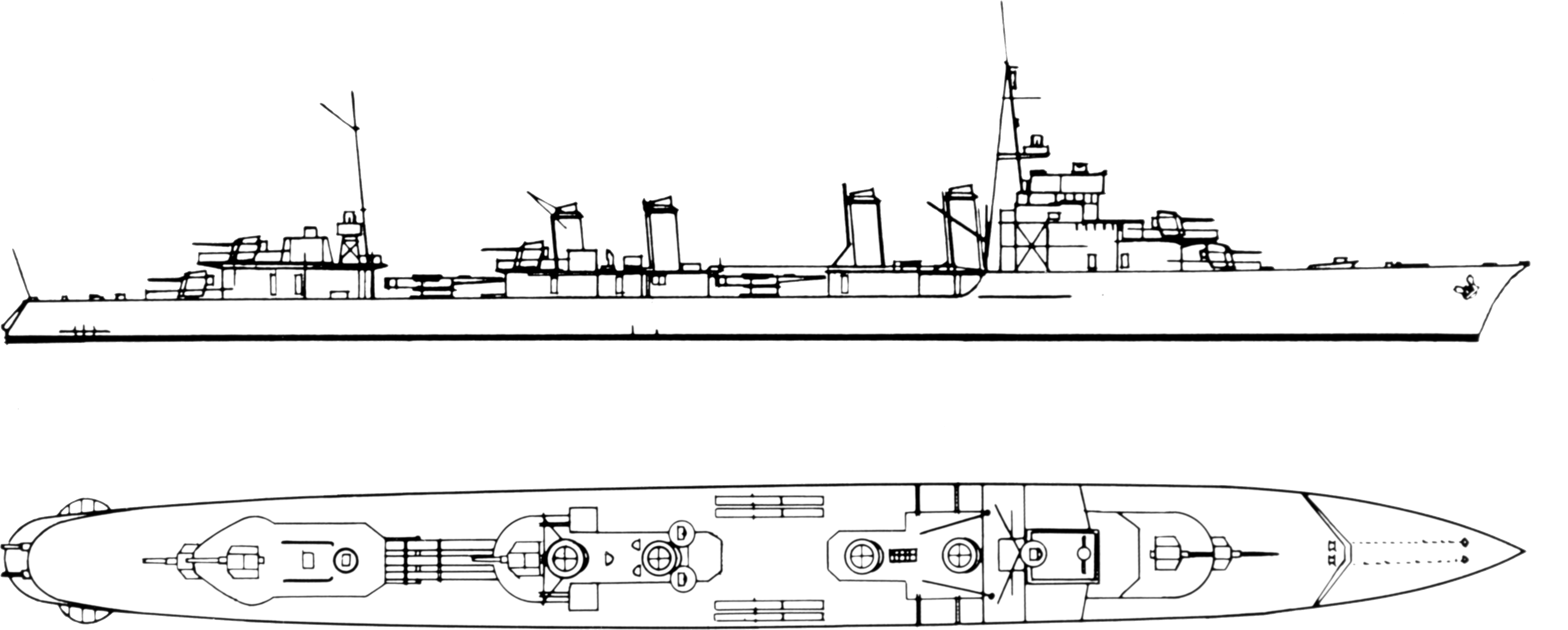
Right elevation and plan of the Vauquelin class

The Vauquelin-class ships were designed as improved versions of the preceding Aigle-class destroyers. They had an overall length of 129.3 meters (424 ft 3 in), a beam of 11.8 meters (38 ft 9 in), and a draft of 4.97 meters (16 ft 4 in). The ships displaced 2,441 metric tons (2,402 long tons) at standard and 3,120 metric tons (3,070 long tons) at deep load. They were powered by two geared Rateau-Breguet steam turbines, each driving one propeller shaft, using steam provided by four du Temple boilers. The turbines were designed to produce 64,000 metric horsepower (47,000 kW; 63,000 shp), which would propel the ships at 36 knots (67 km/h; 41 mph). During her sea trials on 26 August 1932, Cassard's turbines provided 76,833 PS (56,511 kW; 75,782 shp) and she reached 41 knots (76 km/h; 47 mph) for a single hour. The ships carried enough fuel oil to give them a range of 3,000 nautical miles (5,600 km; 3,500 mi) at 14 knots (26 km/h; 16 mph). Their crew consisted of 10 officers and 201 crewmen in peacetime and 12 officers and 220 enlisted men in wartime.

The main armament of the Vauquelin-class ships consisted of five 138.6-millimeter (5.5 in) Modèle 1927 guns in single shielded mounts, one superfiring pair fore and aft of the superstructure and the fifth gun abaft the aft funnel. Their anti-aircraft armament consisted of four 37-millimeter (1.5 in) Modèle 1927 guns in single mounts positioned amidships and two twin mounts for 13.2-millimeter (0.52 in) Hotchkiss Modèle 1929 anti-aircraft machineguns on the forecastle deck abreast the bridge. The ships carried two above-water twin mounts for 550-millimeter (21.7 in) torpedo tubes, one pair on each broadside between each pair of funnels as well as one triple mount aft of the rear pair of funnels able to traverse to both sides. A pair of depth charge chutes were built into their stern; these housed a total of sixteen 200-kilogram (440 lb) depth charges, with eight more in reserve. They were also fitted with a pair of depth-charge throwers, one on each broadside abreast the aft funnels, for which they carried a dozen 100-kilogram (220 lb) depth charges. The ships could be fitted with rails to drop 40 Breguet B4 530-kilogram (1,170 lb) mines.

=== Modifications ===
The depth-charge throwers were removed in 1936 and more 200-kilogram depth charges were carried in their place. The Navy reconsidered its anti-submarine warfare tactics after the war began in September and intended to reinstate the depth-charge throwers, although these were an older model than the one previously installed; Cassard received hers in May 1940 at Toulon. Her depth charge stowage now consisted of 24 heavy depth charges and 16 of the 100-kilogram ones. At the same time, a pair of Browning 13.2-millimeter AA machine guns were installed on the quarterdeck. During the ship's late-1941 anti-aircraft refit, the mainmast was replaced by a platform for a single 37-millimeter twin-gun mount and two of her single 37-millimeter mounts were transferred to the platform while the other two single mounts were removed. The Hotchkiss machine guns were moved to new platforms between the funnels and the Brownings were positioned in front of the bridge. Cassard received a British Alpha 128 ASDIC system in December 1941 that had been taken from another ship.

== Construction and career ==
Cassard, named after the 17th-century commander Jacques Cassard, was ordered on 1 February 1930 from Ateliers et Chantiers de Bretagne as part of the 1929 Naval Program. She was laid down at their Nantes shipyard on 12 November 1930, launched on 8 November 1931, commissioned on 1 November 1932, completed on 10 September 1933, and entered service on 7 October. Her entry into service was delayed by six-month-long repairs to her main gearboxes.

When the Vauquelins entered service they were assigned to the 5th and the newly formed 6th Light Divisions (Division légère (DL)) which were later redesignated as scout divisions (Division de contre-torpilleurs). Cassard and her sister ships Tartu and Chevalier Paul were assigned to the 5th DL of the group of large destroyers (Groupe de contre-torpilleurs (GCT) of the 3rd Squadron (3^{e} Escadre), based in Toulon. After the start of the Spanish Civil War in July 1936, the contre-torpilleurs and destroyers in the Mediterranean were assigned to assist French citizens in Spain and to patrol the surveillance zones assigned to France on a monthly rotation beginning on 24 September as part of the non-intervention agreement.

The GCT reverted to its previous designation of the 3rd Light Squadron on 15 September. As of 1 October 1936 Chevalier Paul, Tartu and Vauquelin were assigned to the 5th Light Division while Cassard, Maillé Brézé and Kersaint belonged to the 9th, both of which were assigned to the Mediterranean Squadron. The 9th DL participated in a naval review held by the Navy Minister Alphonse Gasnier-Duparc in Brest on 27 May 1937. The following year the Mediterranean Squadron cruised the Eastern Mediterranean in May–June 1938; the squadron was redesignated at the Mediterranean Fleet (Flotte de la Méditerranée) on 1 July 1939.

=== World War II ===
On 27 August, in anticipation of war with Nazi Germany, the French Navy planned to reorganize the Mediterranean Squadron into the FHM of three squadrons. When France declared war on 3 September, the reorganization was ordered and the 3rd Light Squadron, which included the 5th and 9th Scout Divisions with all of the Vauquelin-class ships, was assigned to the 3rd Squadron which was transferred to Oran, French Algeria, on 3 September. The 9th Scout Division with Cassard, Kersaint and Maillé Brézé was assigned to escort duties until April 1940, although the former ship was detached (12 November–21 January 1940) to Force X in the Atlantic which was tasked to search for German commerce raiders and blockade runners. Afterwards Cassard rejoined her scout division which had returned to Toulon during her deployment. She was transferred to the 5th Scout Division in early June. Anticipating a declaration of war by the Italians, the Mediterranean Fleet planned to bombard installations on the Italian coast. After they declared war on 10 June, Cassard and the rest of the 5th Scout Division were among the ships ordered to attack targets in Vado Ligure on 14 June. The destroyer was tasked to bombard factories in the town. Two Italian MAS boats on patrol attempted to attack the French ships, but only one was able to launch a torpedo before they were driven off with light damage by the French defensive fire. Damage assessments afterward revealed that little damage had been inflicted despite expending over 1,600 rounds of all calibers.

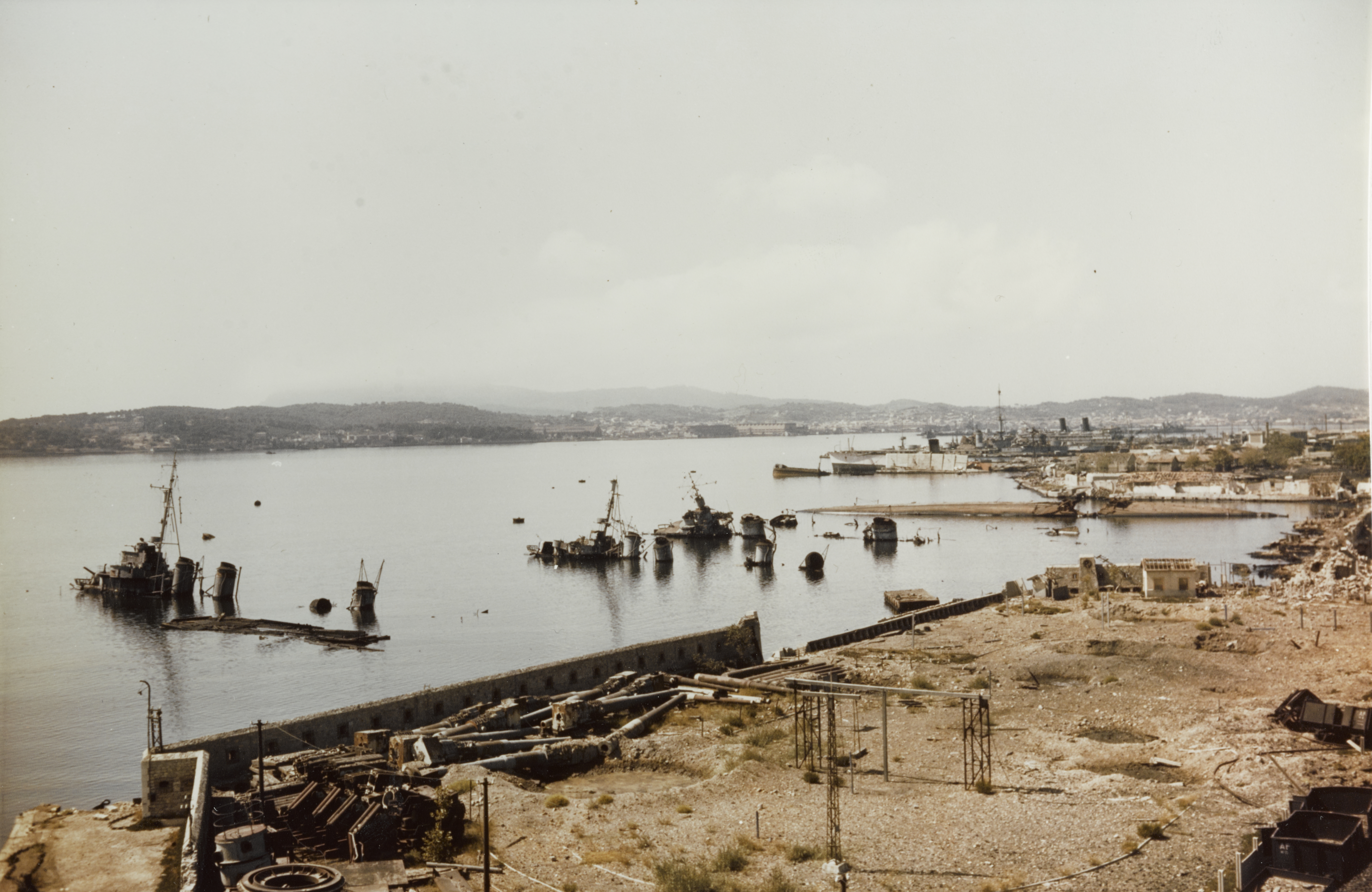
A view of Toulon harbor, late 1944, looking down the length of the Quai Noël. From left to right, Tartu, Cassard and L'Indomptable (all sunk upright), Vautour (nearly fully submerged) and Aigle (capsized and blown in two). In the right center distance is the partially dismantled old battleship Condorcet.

After the French surrender on 22 June, the Royal Navy attacked the ships in Mers-el-Kébir, French Algeria, on 3 July to prevent them from being turned over to the Germans. To avoid an attack on the ships based nearby in Oran, they steamed for Toulon and Cassard was one of the ships that rendezvoused with them en route and escorted them to Toulon. The Vichy French reformed the FHM on 25 September after it negotiated rules limiting the force's activities and numbers with the Italian and German Armistice Commissions. Cassard was the only ship of her class assigned to it and was one of its escorts when they made a training sortie into the Western Mediterranean on 16–18 October. After the Allies invaded French Lebanon and Syria in June 1941, Cassard, Tartu and the heavy cruiser Foch transported a battalion of infantry from Algiers, French Algeria, to Marseille that was intended to reinforce the Levant between 30 June and 1 July. When the Germans attempted to capture the French ships in Toulon on 27 November 1942, the ship was scuttled by her crew. The Germans made an effort to salvage her in late 1943, but gave up the attempt. Cassard's wreck was damaged by an Allied bomb on 7 March 1944 and it was eventually demolished in place during 1950.
