= French ship Épervier =

At least three ships of the French Navy have borne the name Épervier:

- French ship Épervier (1802), an Alcyon-class brig launched in 1802 and captured by the Royal Navy in 1802
- French cruiser Épervier, a Condor-class cruiser launched in 1886 and stricken in 1911
- French destroyer Épervier, an Aigle-class destroyer launched in 1931 and sunk in 1942
