= French cruiser Foch =

Cruiser of the French Navy

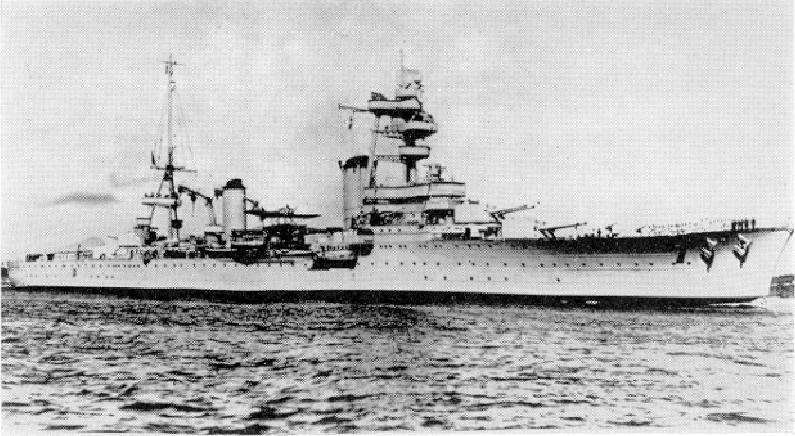
- Foch

History

France
- Name: Foch
- Namesake: Ferdinand Foch
- Ordered: 1 Mar 1928
- Builder: Arsenal de Brest
- Laid down: 21 June 1928
- Launched: 24 April 1929
- Completed: 15 September 1931
- Commissioned: 15 March 1931
- In service: 20 December 1931
- Out of service: 27 November 1942
- Fate: scuttled at Toulon, 27 November 1942. Refloated by the Italians 16 April 1943 then scrapped

General characteristics
- Class & type: Suffren-class cruiser
- Type: Heavy cruiser
- Displacement: 10,160 t (10,000 long tons) (standard); 11,504 t (11,322 long tons) (Normal); 13,644 t (13,429 long tons) (full load)
- Length: 194 m (636.48 ft) overall; 185 m (606.96 ft) between perpendiculars
- Beam: 19.26 m (63.19 ft)
- Draught: 6.57 m (21.56 ft) at normal displacement
- Propulsion: 6 Guyot du Temple boilers, 20 kg/cm2 (215°); 3-shaft Rateau-Bretagne single-reduction geared steam turbines for 88,768.8 shp (66,194.9 kW)
- Speed: 32 knots (59 km/h) (designed)
- Range: 2,600 tons oil fuel; radius 5,300 nautical miles (9,800 km) at 15 knots (28 km/h); 3,700 nautical miles (6,900 km) at 20 knots (37 km/h)
- Complement: 773
- Armament: Initial; 8 × 203 mm (8.0 in)/50 guns (4 × 2); 8 × 90 mm (3.5 in)/50 AA guns (8 × 1); 6 × 37 mm (1.5 in) light AA guns (6 × 1); 12 × 13.2 mm (0.52 in) AA machine guns (4 × 3); 6 × 550 mm (22 in) torpedo tubes (2 × 3); 1941 refit; 8 × 203 mm (8.0 in)/50 guns (4 × 2); 8 × 90 mm (3.5 in)/50 AA guns (8 × 1); 14 × 37 mm (1.5 in) light AA guns (4 × 2, 6 × 1); 32 × 13.2 mm (0.52 in) AA machine guns (7 × 4, 2 × 2); 7 × 8 mm (0.31 in) AA machine guns (7 × 1); 6 × 550 mm (22 in) torpedo tubes (2 × 3)
- Armour: Caisson: 54 mm (2.1 in) sides and 18 mm (0.71 in) deck over machinery spaces; Deck: 25 mm (0.98 in); Turrets and conning tower: 30 mm (1.2 in); Magazine box 54 mm (2.1 in) sides with 20 mm (0.79 in) crowns; Steering gear: 26 mm (1.0 in) sides and 18 mm (0.71 in) roof
- Aircraft carried: 3 GL-810 then Loire-Nieuport 130
- Aviation facilities: 2 catapults

Foch was the third unit of the Suffren class. She entered service in 1931 and spent the interwar period in the Mediterranean. September 1939 found her still in Toulon. She participated in the search for the Graf Spee in the Atlantic before returning to Toulon. The only time she fired her guns in anger was during the bombardment of Vado, Italy in mid-June 1940. She was at Toulon at the time of the Franco-German Armistice in June 1940. She remained at Toulon until the French Fleet there was scuttled in late November 1942. She was subsequently raised by the Italians who scrapped her in 1943-44.

She was originally to be named Louvois after the Marquis de Louvois, the Minister of War under King Louis XIV. However, Marshall Ferdinand Foch, France's most famous soldier during the First World War died on 29 March 1929 one month before her launch. She was then renamed Foch in his honour. The main gun turrets were named after places that were associated with Marshall Foch during the Great War.

== Design and description ==
In the 1927 tranche there was a provision for a 10,000 ton Treaty Cruiser, the vessel would become the third unit of the Suffren class. The hull construction would be the same as the previous two but the level of protection would be changed. The shallow armoured belt would be discarded in favour of an armoured caisson over the machinery spaces with an increase on the magazine sides. The coal fired cruising boilers would not be installed. In their place an extra oil fuel bunker would be installed. The removal of these boilers led to the second funnel being slimmer than the previous vessels. A tripod fore mast was installed with the supporting legs more splayed than the others. The high angle directors were placed on top of the legs. Aircraft arrangements and guns would be the same as the Colbert. She was ordered on 1 March 1927 then laid down as Project Number C2 with her hull designation of 100 on 21 June 1927 after the launch of her sister ship Colbert. She was launched on 24 April 1929. She commenced her sea trials on 1 August 1930 and her acceptance trials on 16 December 1930. She was commissioned on 15 March and finally completed on 15 September 1931.

== Service history ==
=== Pre War service ===
She entered service on 20 December 1931 being assigned to the First Light Division at Toulon. On 19 October 1934 the First Light was reduced in size by the formation of the Third Light Division with Foch, Duquesne and Tourville. On 1 March 1936 she was replaced by Suffren in the 3rd Division then assigned to the First Light Division. She was in attendance for a Fleet Inspection in the Bay of Douranenez on 27 June 1935. On 12 April 1937 the First Light Division was renamed as the First Cruiser Division and consisted of Colbert, Foch, Dupleix and Algérie.

=== Wartime service ===
Foch was at Toulon on the outbreak of War in September 1939. She sailed for Dakar, Senegal in November arriving on 16 November becoming a member of Force X. On 7 December she sailed with Dupleix, the British cruiser Neptune, the British carrier Hermes and two contre torpilleurs, Milan and Cassard. The ships were informed of the engagement off the River Plate when they were 850 nm from Pernambuco. They returned to Dakar to refuel so they could better place themselves if Admiral Graf Spee escaped to the sea. Force X again sortied from Dakar on 30 December returning on 5 January 1940. She departed Dakar for the last time on 23 January with the cruiser Dupleix to escort a convoy from Bermuda to Morocco. Both ships then returned to Toulon.

On the night of 13/14 June she participated in Operation Vado, the bombardment of Genoa and Vado, Italy by the Third Squadron. The Vado Group included the cruisers Foch and Algérie and the Genoa Group included the cruisers Dupleix and Colbert. The bombardment cause little damage as Group Genoa fired at the wrong target and half of Group Vado shells fell into the sea. The squadron returned to Toulon by mid-day on 14 June. Foch suffered a steering malfunction, but returned safely. On 25 June the Franco-German Armistice took effect and La Marine National ceased all offensive operations. On 3 July with the ill-conceived British attack on Mers-el-Kébir, the battleship Strasbourg had escaped undamaged, the Fourth Cruiser Division had sailed from Algiers to Oran. The Fourth failed to link up with Strasbourg so they sailed for Toulon. Algérie, Foch and Colbert with twelve contre-torpilleurs sailed from Toulon to rendezvous with the French forces sailing north to France. They linked up with the Fourth in the early morning of 4 July and returned to Toulon. Strasbourg arrived later that evening. With continued British action around Dakar, the Vichy French had scheduled for 22 September 1940 to send the cruisers Algérie, Foch, Dupleix, Marseillaise and La Galissonnière plus three contre torpilleurs and two fleet torpedo boats to Dakar as reinforcements. The plan was vetoed by the Germans on 20 September.

On 11 November 1942 the Germans started their occupation of Vichy France. The FHM was ready to sail to North Africa to defend it from the Torch landings but was denied permission to sail. By 27 November the Germans had reached Toulon and entered the base. The Germans were delayed from entering the naval dockyard giving the French sailors time to scuttle the fleet. Foch was in a deactivated state at Castigneau, Toulon. Her guns were spiked with 35 kg charges that were detonated destroying the guns and the sea cocks and condensers were opened and the ship settled to the bottom. She was raised by the Italians who scrapped her between 1943 and 1944.

== Bibliography ==
- Jordan, John & Moulin, Jean (2013). French Cruisers 1922–1956. Barnsley, UK: Seaforth Publishing. ISBN 978-1-84832-133-5.
- McMurtrie, Francis E. (1940). Jane's Fighting Ships 1940. London, UK: Sampson Low, Marston & Company, Ltd.
- Saibène, Marc (1992). Toulon et la Marine 1942–1944. Bourg en Bresse: Marines Editions at Realisations. ISBN 9782909675022.
- Whitley, M.J. (1995). Cruisers of World War Two – An International Encyclopedia. London, UK: Arms and Armour Press. ISBN 1-85409-225-1.
