= French cruiser Algérie =

French WW II-era heavy cruiser

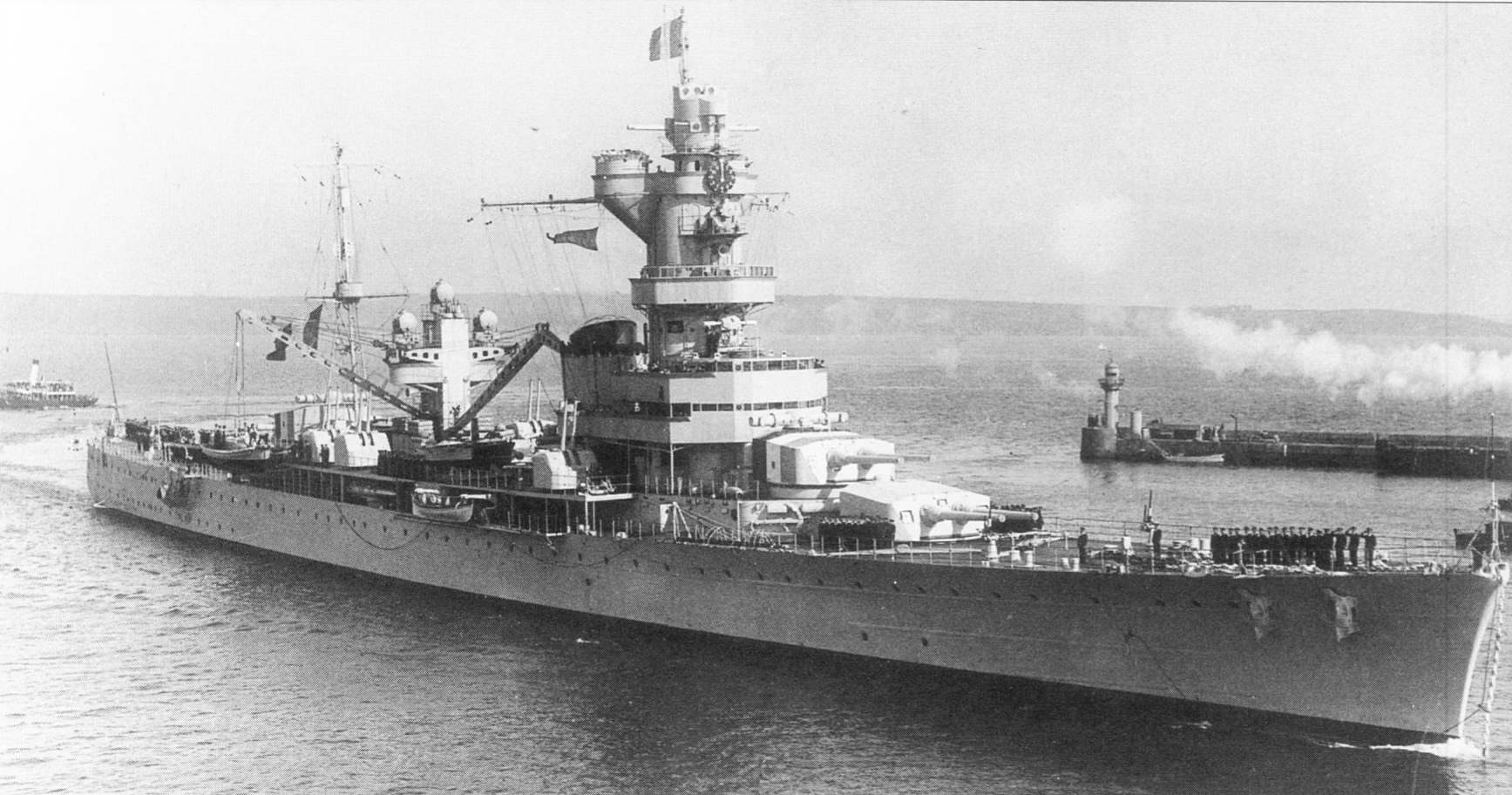
- Algérie in May 1937

Class overview
- Operators: French Navy
- Preceded by: Suffren class
- Succeeded by: Saint-Louis class (planned)
- Completed: 1
- Lost: 1

History

France
- Name: Algérie
- Namesake: Algeria
- Ordered: 15 May 1930
- Builder: Arsenal de Brest, Brest
- Laid down: 19 March 1931
- Launched: 21 May 1932
- Completed: 5 September 1934
- Commissioned: 15 June 1934
- Fate: Scuttled at Toulon, 27 November 1942. Scrapped 1951

General characteristics
- Type: Heavy cruiser
- Displacement: 10,160 t (10,000 long tons) (standard); 10,950 t (10,780 long tons) (Normal); 13,677 t (13,461 long tons) (full load)
- Length: 186.2 m (610 ft 11 in) overall; 180 m (590 ft 7 in) between perpendiculars
- Beam: 20 m (65 ft 7 in)
- Draught: 6.3 m (20 ft 8 in)
- Propulsion: 6 boilers; 4 geared steam turbines
- Speed: 31 knots (57 km/h; 36 mph)
- Range: 8,000 nmi (15,000 km; 9,200 mi) at 15 knots (28 km/h; 17 mph); 4,000 nmi (7,400 km; 4,600 mi) at 27 knots (50 km/h; 31 mph)
- Complement: 746
- Armament: Initial; 8 × 203 mm (8.0 in)/50 guns (4 × 2); 12 × 100 mm (3.9 in)/45 guns (6 × 2); 4 × 37 mm (1.5 in) light AA guns (4 × 1); 16 × 13.2 mm (0.52 in) AA machine guns (4 × 4); 6 × 550 mm (22 in) torpedo tubes (3 × 2); 1941 refit; 8 × 203 mm (8.0 in)/50 guns (4 × 2); 12 × 100 mm (3.9 in)/45 guns (6 × 2); 8 × 37 mm (1.5 in) light AA guns (4 × 2); 4 × 13.2 mm (0.52 in) AA machine guns (4 × 1); 16 × 13.2 mm (0.52 in) AA machine guns (4 × 4); 6 × 550 mm (22 in) torpedo tubes (3 × 2)
- Armour: Armoured Belt: 110 mm (4.3 in); Deck: 30 mm (1.2 in) to 80 mm (3.1 in); Turrets: 100 mm (3.9 in) face. 70 mm (2.8 in) sides and roof, 50 mm (2.0 in) rear; Conning tower: 100 mm (3.9 in) sides, 70 mm (2.8 in) roof; Steering gear: 26 mm (1.0 in) sides and 18 mm (0.71 in) roof
- Aircraft carried: 2 GL-810 then Loire-Nieuport 130
- Aviation facilities: 1 catapults

Algérie was the last heavy cruiser constructed for the French Navy. Designed and built in response to the Italian's Zara class of 8-inch gun cruisers, she was a totally new design and not based on the previous ships. The armoured caisson system used in Foch and Dupleix was abandoned in favour of a full armoured belt enclosing both the magazines and machinery spaces. She abandoned the unit propulsion system used previously and grouped her boilers forward leading to the reduction to a single funnel. She was one of the first vessels to utilize super heating boilers. Welding was used primarily in place of the normal rivetting in previous vessels. She maintained the same main armament but her secondary guns were increased to 100 mm guns. She served in the Mediterranean Sea after entering service then searched for German surface raiders at the beginning of the war. She was at Toulon, France, at the time of the Armistice and remained there until scuttled in November 1942.

Normally major ships of the Marine Nationale were named after famous people or statesmen but instead she was named to honour the 100 years of French colonial rule of Algeria.

== Design and description ==
=== Hull and protection ===
Ordered on 15 May 1930, she was laid down on 19 March 1931 as Project C4 with her hull designated as hull no 141 at the Arsenal de Brest. Algérie was launched on 21 May 1932. Her hull was 180 metres (590 ft 7 in) between the perpendiculars with an overall length of 186.2 metres (610 ft 11 in) and a beam of 20 metres (65 ft 7 in). At her normal displacement of 10,950 t (10,780 long tons) she had a draught of 6.3 metres (20 ft 8 in). Her full load displacement was 13,677 t (13,461 long tons). Her hull was flush decked with no raised forecastle. Her bridge structure was a tower and no tripod of the earlier ships would be installed.

Her protection would be an armoured belt 100 mm (3.9 in) thick made of high tensile 80 kilogram (kg) steel. This belt varied in height from 3.76 metres (12 ft 4 in) to 4.45 metres (14 ft 7 in) from the forward main magazines to just aft of the machinery spaces. From the machinery spaces to the end of the after main magazines it was a uniform height of 2.45 metres (8 ft 0 in). It extended 1.0 metre (3 ft 3 in) below the waterline at normal displacement. Each end of the belt was joined by transverse armoured bulkheads of 70 mm (2.8 in). The deck of the vessel had 80 mm (3.1 in) of the 80 kg steel. The conning tower had 100 mm (3.9 in) sides with a 70 mm (2.8 in) roof. She was the first treaty cruiser to have an extensive underwater protection system against a hull breach. The double bottom was extended up to the main deck. Inboard of this was the fuel bunkers. Between the machinery spaces and the fuel bunkers was a space of 1.0 metre (3 ft 3 in). The outer wall of the machinery spaces was 40 mm (1.6 in) of 60 kg steel increasing to 50 mm (2.0 in) to 60 mm (2.4 in) at the ends providing splinter protection for the magazines and machinery spaces.

=== Machinery ===
She was one of the first major vessels to utilize the super heating boilers which produced a pressure of 27 kg/cm^{2} (380 psi) at 325 degrees Celsius (617 degrees Fahrenheit). She would ship six vertical small tube boilers built by Indret. In boiler rooms 1 and 2 there were four identical boilers with a heating surface of 885 m^{2} (9,530 sq ft). In boiler room 3 to starboard there was a larger model with a heating surface of 1,515 m^{2} (16,310 sq ft) and a smaller one to port with only 300 m^{2} (3,200 sq ft) of heating surface. The small boiler was for auxiliary systems and did not drive the turbines. The boiler rooms were all grouped just forwards of amidships reducing the vessel to a single funnel. Four Rateau-Bretagne single reduction gear steam turbines were fitted reverting to the four shaft arrangement of the Duquesnes. These would produce 84,000 CV (chevaux or horses) for a designed speed of 31 knots (57 km/h; 36 mph). She would carry 3,190 tons of oil fuel giving a range of 8,000 nautical miles (15,000 km; 9,200 mi) at 15 knots (28 km/h; 17 mph) or 4,000 nmi (7,400 km; 4,600 mi) at 27 knots (50 km/h; 31 mph).

=== Armament ===
The requirement for the main armament of eight 203-millimetre (8 in) guns housed in four armoured turrets with 120 rounds per gun and with maximum magazine storage of 150 rounds per gun during wartime was retained in Algérie. The weapon used was the 203 mm/50 (8 in) Model 1924 naval gun. The guns were mounted in four Cruiser Two Gun Turret Model 1931 providing a separation of the axis of the guns by 74 inches. The turret was more heavily armoured. The face had 100 mm (3.9 in) of 80 kg nickel-chrome steel plate angled at 41 degrees, the sides and roof were of 70 mm (2.8 in) thickness with the back 50 mm (2.0 in). The mount provided an elevation from minus 5 degree to plus 45 degrees with an elevation rate of ten degrees per second. The mount could be trained to plus or minus 90 degrees from the centerline of the vessel with a train rate of six degrees per second. The guns could be loaded at any degree of train but only between minus 5 and plus ten degrees in elevation. The loading cycle started with the rammer cocked by the recoil of the guns. A dredger hoist brought the shell and two half charge bags to the breech. The rammer drove the shell into the breech with the powder being loaded by hand. The breech would close and the gun would be fired. The guns could maintain a rate of fire of four to five rounds per minute.

The medium anti-aircraft armament was augmented with four 37 mm/50 (1.46 inch) model 1925 guns in Model 1925 single mounts. With an elevation only to plus 85 degrees they had a slow rate of fire, 15 to 21 rounds per minute therefore were not effective against modern aircraft when installed. To complete the light AA armament sixteen 13.2 mm (0.5 inch) Model 1929 machine guns were installed in Model 1931 quad mounts. Two would be mounted forward on the lower bridge wings and the second pair aft.

For torpedoes two launchers Model 1929T for 550 mm torpedoes were fitted to port and starboard When in the locked position the starboard launcher faced forward and the port launcher faced aft. The tubes could be trained and fired either locally or from the armoured conning tower. The ships initially carried the 55 cm (21.65 inch) 23DT, Toulon torpedo. Nine torpedoes were carried, six in the tubes with three spares.

Her catapult was of the compressed air type. The catapult was 22.3 meters long with the launching system using 21 meters of the length. She operated two GL 811/812 mono floatplanes. The GL series was replaced with the Loire-Nieuport 130 floatplane by 1939. Her catapult was mounted to port and not on the centreline.

== Service history ==
=== War service ===
Algérie started World War II as flagship of the 1st Cruiser Squadron which also included the cruisers Dupleix, Foch, Duquesne, Tourville, Colbert and destroyers from the 5th, 7th and 9th contre-torpilleur divisions. Algérie, Dupleix, the battleship Strasbourg and the British aircraft carrier Hermes were based in Dakar in French West Africa, while searching for the German heavy cruiser Admiral Graf Spee.

In March 1940, after refitting at Toulon, she accompanied the battleship Bretagne to Canada, with 3,000 cases of French gold. In April, Algérie returned to the Mediterranean and when Italy declared war on France, she helped shell Genoa in June. Her last mission before the French surrender was as a convoy escort.

After the French defeat in 1940, Algérie remained with the Vichy fleet based at Toulon. Her only mission for the Vichy navy was to escort the battleship Provence back to Toulon, as the battleship had been summarily repaired after the damages received during the British attack on Mers-el-Kébir in 1940. In 1941, her secondary and anti-aircraft weaponry was strengthened and in 1942, she was fitted with the early French-built radar.

She was still there when the Germans invaded the so-called "Free Zone" on 27 November 1942. She was among the ships scuttled in the scuttling of the French fleet in Toulon. Demolition charges were set on the ship. The Germans tried to persuade her crew that scuttling was not permitted by Armistice provisions; her captain requested the Germans to wait until his superior could advise, as the fuses were lit. When Admiral Lacroix finally arrived, he ordered the ship evacuated; as the Germans were preparing to board, he told them that the cruiser was about to explode. She was blown up and burned for 20 days.

The Italians raised her in sections on 18 March 1943. The remains were bombed and sunk again on 7 March 1944, and were finally raised and broken up for scrap in 1949.

== Notes ==
- all ship statistical data from French Cruisers 1922 - 1956 (Jordan & Moulin, Chapter 3, The Suffren Class, Design and Construction, Building Data and General Characteristics: Suffren and Colbert) unless otherwise noted
- French sources do not use shaft horsepower rating for the power output of their machinery. Instead the term 'chevaux' (CV) or horses is used. To convert the French measure to SHP simply multiply the CV value by 0.98632 to find the true SHP value. Jane's did not do this nor has many of the English language sources. The reference French Cruisers 1922 - 1956 shows the horse power values as only CV and gives the value for conversion to SHP used in many sources.

== Bibliography ==
- Jordan, John & Moulin, Jean (2013). French Cruisers 1922–1956. Barnsley, UK: Seaforth Publishing. ISBN 978-1-84832-133-5.
- McMurtrie, Francis E. (1940). Jane's Fighting Ships 1940. London, UK: Sampson Low, Marston & Company, Ltd.
- Rohwer, Juergen; Huemmelchen, Gerhard (2005). Chronology of the war at sea 1939-1945: The Naval History of World War Two (3rd ed.). London, England: Chatham Publishing. p. 28. ISBN 1-59114-119-2.
- Whitley, M.J. (1995). Cruisers of World War Two – An International Encyclopedia. London, UK: Arms and Armour Press. ISBN 1-85409-225-1.
