= Suffren-class cruiser =

French Navy ship class

- Schematics of the Suffren class

Class overview
- Name: Suffren class
- Builders: Arsenal de Brest
- Operators: French Navy
- Preceded by: Duquesne class
- Succeeded by: Algérie
- Built: 1925-1932
- In service: 1930-1972
- Completed: 4
- Lost: 3
- Scrapped: 1

General characteristics (Suffren)
- Type: Heavy cruiser; French designation; Light cruiser (1925); 1st class cruiser (1931)
- Displacement: 10,160 t (10,000 long tons) (standard); 11,769 t (11,583 long tons) (Normal); 13,135 t (12,928 long tons) (full load)
- Length: 194 m (636.48 ft) overall; 185 m (606.96 ft) between perpendiculars
- Beam: 19.26 m (63.19 ft)
- Draught: 6.51 m (21.36 ft)
- Installed power: 6 boilers; 88,768.8 shp (66,194.9 kW)
- Propulsion: 3-shaft geared steam turbines
- Speed: 32 knots (59 km/h) (designed)
- Range: 4,600 nautical miles (8,500 km) at 15 knots (28 km/h)
- Complement: 773
- Armament: 4 × 2 203mm/50 Modèle 1924 guns in Model 1924 twin mounts; 8 × 1 Canon de 75 mm modèle 1924 guns on a model 1922 HA single mounts; 4 × 2 Canon de 37 mm Modèle 1925 guns on single mount CA Model 1925; 12 × 1 Hotchkiss M1929 machine gun on single mounts; 6 × 550 mm (22 in) torpedo tubes Model 1925T triple mounts with 9 Model 1923D, Toulon torpedoes
- Armour: Belt: 50 mm (2.0 in); Deck: 25 mm (0.98 in); Turrets and conning tower: 30 mm (1.2 in); Magazine box 50 mm (2.0 in) sides with 20 mm (0.79 in) crowns
- Aircraft carried: 2 GL-810 then Loire-Nieuport 130
- Aviation facilities: 2 catapults

The Suffren class was an interwar treaty cruiser built by France for the French Navy. The design was based on the preceding Duquesne-class cruiser and traded speed for protection while retaining the same armament. The first ship, Suffren, was completed based on this design. The following ships, Colbert, Foch, Dupleix, were completed to a modified design with heavier secondary armament and rearranged topside. The ships entered service from 1930 to 1933, with Suffren being the sole survivor of the Second World War.

Prior to the London Naval Treaty, the French Navy classified cruisers as armoured (croiseur cuirasse) or light (croiseurs legers); afterwards cruisers were divided between first class (croiseur de 1ere classe) and second class (croiseur de 2e classe). The Suffren was initially classified as a light cruiser, and then as a first class cruiser on 1 July 1931.

== Design and description ==
=== Hull and protection ===
The design of the Suffren was based on the Duquesne-class cruiser while maintaining the standard displacement of 10.000 tons. The hull maintained the high freeboard with the raised forecastle of all post-war cruisers with excellent sea keeping qualities. The hull design also kept the fine lines for the speed requirement complemented by the clipper bow with a gentle sheer and the marked flare keeping the forecastle dry even in heavy weather. The framing in a French hull was numbered from aft to stem, frame numbering was based on the distance from the aft perpendicular in meters. The longitudinal framing was used for cruisers throughout the interwar period. The hull was 185 meters (606 ft 11 in) between the perpendiculars with an overall length of 194 meters (636 ft 6 in) and a beam of 19.26 meters (63 ft 2 in). At her normal displacement of 11,769 tonnes the draft of the ship would be 6.51 meters (21 ft 4 in).

The protection was increased over the previous Duquesne. The armour protection in the hull for the Duquesne was only 370 tons whereas Suffern would have 670 tons. The upper deck was 25 mm (0.98 in) thick amidships with 25 mm (0.98 in) bulkheads running to within 3.18 meters (10 ft 5 in) of the sides enclosing the funnel uptakes and ventilation trunking between the main and first deck. The magazines were enclosed in an armoured box with 50 mm (2.0 in) sides and 20 mm (0.79 in) crowns, forward and aft bulkheads. The turrets and conning tower had 30 mm (1.2 in) plating. The roofs of both the turrets and range finders was 35 mm (1.4 in) of cast nickel. The steering gear was housed inside an armoured box with 26 mm (1.0 in) sides and an 18 mm (0.71 in) top. A Belt of 50 mm (2.0 in) made of non-cemented 60 kg steel was installed to a height of 2.6 meters (8 ft 6 in) and 1.0 meter (3 ft 3 in) below the waterline abeam of the machinery spaces in Suffren and Colbert only. The space between the machinery bulkhead and the inside of the hull was approximately 2.1 meters (6 ft 11 in). For Suffren and Colbert this space was filled with 500 tons of coal for the cruising boilers and therefore did not count against the standard displacement.

Reinterpreting the rules of the Washington Naval Treaty, the STNC decided to change and improve the level of protection on the next cruiser of the series, Foch. The interpretation was for Washington standard displacement to mean a peacetime load versus what would be required for a full wartime load. With the concept of shells striking the sides above the shallow armoured belt being able to penetrate to the machinery spaces, it was decided to do away with the belt and replace it with an armoured box around the machinery. The sides of this armoured box was 54 mm (2.1 in) with the deck above of the armoured box was 18 mm (0.71 in). The bulkheads of the box varied in height from 5.5 meters (18 ft 1 in) to 6.1 meters (20 ft 0 in). The protection on the sides of the magazines was increased to 54 mm (2.1 in) with all other protection remaining the same. The last cruiser of the program, Dupleix, would be protected along the same lines as Foch, but with a slight increase. All longitudinal bulkheads were increased from 54 mm (2.1 in) to 60 mm (2.4 in) on the magazines and machinery spaces. The main deck over the machinery spaces was increased from 18 mm to 60 mm (2.4 in). The upper deck however, was decreased from 25 mm (0.98 in) to 22 mm (0.87 in). The magazine crowns were also increased to 30 mm (1.2 in).

=== Machinery ===
The propulsion system was changed from the four shaft arrangement of the Duquesne to a three shaft arrangement in the Suffren. Three single reduction gear Rateau-Bretagne steam turbines with six Guyot du Temple small tube boilers built by Indret rated at 20 kg/cm^{2} while operating at 215 °F (102 °C) would produce 90,000 CV (Note: CV (chevaux or "horses") is a French unit of power. 1 CV is equal to 0.98632 shp.) on three shafts to achieve a designed speed of 32 knots (59 km/h; 37 mph). The forward boiler and engine rooms would be the same as in the Duquesne. The forward engine room would drive the wing shafts. The aft boiler rooms and turbine would be inline driving the center shaft. Each boiler room would have only one boiler. Between the forward engine room and the aft boiler rooms two smaller coal/oil fired boilers would be installed in Suffren and Colbert only. These smaller boilers would be connected to the center line turbine for low speed cruising and were known as cruising boilers. The six main boilers would be oil fired with a maximum load of 1,876 tons of oil giving an endurance of 4,600 nm at 15 knots and 3,700 nm at 20 knots. For Suffren and Colbert carried 640 tons of coal for the cruise boilers and would provide another 2,000 nm at 11 knots. Twin side by side rudders were installed abaft between the shafts. To reduce the tactical radius of the vessels the centerline skeg was removed in the first three vessels (Suffren, Colbert and Foch) though it was reinstalled on the fourth unit (Dupleixh). They were considered good sea boats and responsive to the helm at speeds above 10 knots.

=== Armament ===
The armament as designed mirrored the Duquesne.

The main armament was eight 203 mm/50 Model 1924 guns in four twin turrets; the turrets were the same ones used on the Duquesnes. The magazines held 150 rounds per gun, although only 120 rounds per gun were carried in peacetime to keep displacement within treaty limits. The magazines were raised to accommodate the central shaft.

The secondary armament on Suffren was eight 75 mm/50 Model 1924 high-angle guns in single mounts. Starting with Colbert these were replaced by eight 90 mm/50 Model 1926 high-angle guns in Model 1926 single mounts. Dupleix carried the 90 mm guns in four Model 1930 twin mounts.

The light anti-aircraft armament on Suffren was eight 37 mm/50 Model 1925 guns in single mounts. Starting with Colbert this was reduced to six; the reduction was to be compensated by adding quadruple 13.2 mm Hotchkiss machine guns but these did not become available in quantity until the end of the 1930s.Suffren received six twin 13.2 mm Hotchkiss machine guns in 1934. In 1941, Colbert was fitted with four of the quadruple Hotchkiss machine guns as well as four single 13.2 mm Browning machine guns. Foch and Dupleix received a few Browning machine guns by the time they was scuttled; the latter had the forecastle 37 mm gun removed.

Two triple-tubed Model 1925T torpedo launchers were mounted to port and starboard, firing 550 mm Model 1923D torpedoes. There were three reloads.

Suffren's refit in early-1944 replaced most of her earlier secondary and light armament with Bofors 40 mm and Oerlikon 20 mm cannon. Two 75 mm were retained aft. The torpedoes were also removed.

=== Aircraft ===
Two catapults were installed. On Suffren, they were mounted were installed between the aft funnel and the main mast. On the later ships, they were moved forward between the funnels. The original design embarked four aircraft - one on each catapult, and two between the funnels - but in practice Suffren carried only two - one on a catapult, and another abaft the forward funnel. The CAMS 37 was the intended aircraft but was never carried. Instead, the Gordou-Lesseurre GL-810 and GL-811 were operated in the early years of service. The catapults were modified to operate the Loire 130; this occurred in 1937 for Suffren and shortly before the Second World War for the remaining ships.

Suffren's aviation facilities were removed during the refit in early-1944.

== History ==
Following the completion of the Duquesne design, France learned that the Italian Trento-class cruiser incorporated 70mm belt and 50mm deck armour. The 1924 Naval General Staff requirements for the next French treaty cruiser demanded greater protection while closely matching other characteristics of the Duquesne. This was impossible within the 10,000 long ton limit. Instead, the added protection was paid for by removing machinery and reducing speed by 2 knots. A second catapult was added, and the light anti-aircraft armament changed from 40 mm to 37 mm guns, after January 1925. One ship, Suffren, was ordered as part of the 1925 building programme and laid down in 1926. The Suffren design was further modified to improve aircraft and boat handling. The single centerline crane between the funnels was replaced by cranes to either side of the aft funnel. The ship's silhouette was further changed by rearranging the catapults, boats, and torpedo tubes. Finally, the 76mm guns were replaced by 90mm guns. The remaining ships were built to the modified design. The first ship, Colbert, was ordered as part of the 1926 programme and laid down in 1927. The Suffrens joined the Mediterranean Fleet at Toulon in 1931-1932.

Suffren replaced the cruiser Primauguet in French Indochina in July 1939 and remained until April 1940. She conducted patrols and escorted troops convoys during the first months of the Second World War. The cruiser returned to the Mediterranean Sea in May 1940 and joined Force X at Alexandria.

Colbert, Foch and Dupleix performed wartime service in the Mediterranean and the Atlantic Ocean as parts of Force X and Y. On the night of 13-14 June 1940, they and the cruiser Algérie bombarded the Italian coast around Genoa as part of Operation Vado; little damage was done. The cruisers returned to Toulon after the French armistice in June 1940, and were scuttled there in November 1942.

Suffren and Force X were immobilized at Alexandria by the British, and rejoined the Allies in May 1943. She conducted Atlantic blockade patrols from Dakar in 1943-1944. After the war, she participated in reasserting French rule in French Indochina, including transporting troops from France and in theatre, and conducting shore bombardment. Suffren decommissioned in 1947 and used for training, being renamed Ocean in 1962 to free the name for a frigate. The hull was stricken in March 1972 and scrapped after February 1976.

== Ships ==
Construction data
Ship name	Launched	In service	Out of service	Fate
Suffren	3 May 1927	8 March 1930	24 March 1972	Towed from Toulon for scrapping 22 February 1976
Colbert	20 April 1928	1 April 1931	27 November 1942	Scuttled at Toulon
Foch	21 June 1928	20 December 1931	27 November 1942	Scuttled at Toulon
Dupleix	9 October 1930	15 November 1933	27 November 1942	Scuttled at Toulon

== Notes ==
- all ship statistical data from French Cruisers 1922 - 1956 (Jordan & Moulin, Chapter 3, The Suffren Class, Design and Construction, Building Data and General Characteristics: Suffren and Colbert) unless otherwise noted

== Bibliography ==
- Jordan, John & Moulin, Jean (2013). French Cruisers 1922–1956. Barnsley, UK: Seaforth Publishing. ISBN 978-1-84832-133-5.
- McMurtrie, Francis E. (1940). Jane's Fighting Ships 1940. London, UK: Sampson Low, Marston & Company, Ltd.
- Whitley, M.J. (1995). Cruisers of World War Two – An International Encyclopedia. London, UK: Arms and Armour Press. ISBN 1-85409-225-1.
