= French destroyer Gerfaut =

Destroyer of the French Navy

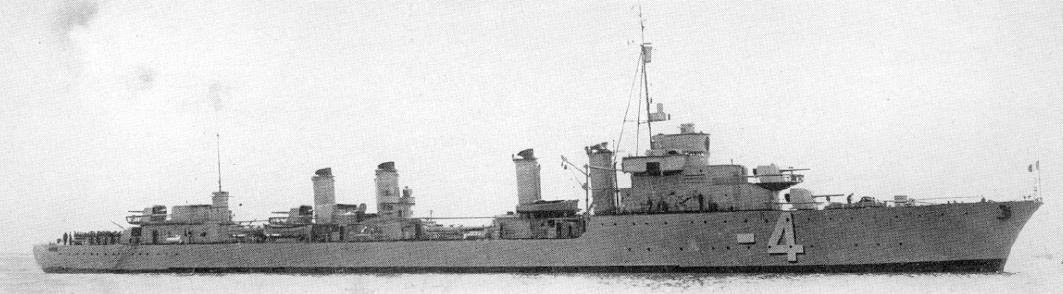
- Half-sister Milan at anchor

History

France
- Name: Gerfaut
- Namesake: Gerfalcon
- Builder: Ateliers et Chantiers de Bretagne, Nantes
- Launched: 14 June 1930
- Completed: 30 January 1932
- Fate: Scuttled, 27 November 1942

General characteristics (as built)
- Class & type: Aigle-class destroyer
- Displacement: 2,441 long tons (2,480 t) (standard)
- Length: 128.5 m (421 ft 7 in)
- Beam: 11.8 m (38 ft 9 in)
- Draught: 4.97 m (16 ft 4 in)
- Installed power: 4 du Temple boilers; 64,000 PS (47,000 kW; 63,000 shp)
- Propulsion: 2 shafts; 2 geared steam turbines
- Speed: 36 knots (67 km/h; 41 mph)
- Range: 3,650 nmi (6,760 km; 4,200 mi) at 18 knots (33 km/h; 21 mph)
- Crew: 10 officers, 217 crewmen (wartime)
- Armament: 5 × single 138.6 mm (5.5 in) guns; 1 × single 75 mm (3 in) AA gun; 4 × single 37 mm (1.5 in) AA guns; 2 × triple 550 mm (21.7 in) torpedo tubes; 2 chutes, 4 throwers for 36 depth charges

Gerfaut was one of six Aigle-class destroyers (contre-torpilleurs) built for the French Navy during the 1930s.

== Design and description ==
The Aigle-class ships were designed as improved versions of the preceding Guépard-class destroyers. They had an overall length of 128.5 meters (421 ft 7 in), a beam of 11.8 meters (38 ft 9 in), and a draft of 4.97 meters (16 ft 4 in). The ships displaced 2,441 long tons (2,480 t) at standard and 3,140 metric tons (3,090 long tons) at deep load. The ships were powered by two geared steam turbines, each driving one propeller shaft using steam provided by four du Temple boilers. The turbines were designed to produce 64,000 metric horsepower (47,000 kW; 63,000 shp), which would propel the ships at 36 knots (67 km/h; 41 mph). During her sea trials on 30 April 1931, Gerfaut's Rateau-Bretagne turbines reached 41.46 knots (76.78 km/h; 47.71 mph) for a single hour. The ships carried enough fuel oil to give them a range of 3,650 nautical miles (6,760 km; 4,200 mi) at 18 knots (33 km/h; 21 mph). Their crew consisted of 10 officers and 198 crewmen in peacetime and 10 officers and 217 enlisted men in wartime.

The main armament of the Aigle-class ships consisted of five 138.6-millimeter (5.5 in) Modèle 1927 guns in single shielded mounts, one superfiring pair fore and aft of the superstructure and the fifth gun abaft the aft funnel. Albatros's anti-aircraft armament consisted of a 75-millimeter (3 in) M1897-15 gun forward of the rear pair of funnels and four semi-automatic 37-millimeter (1.5 in) Modèle 1927 guns in single mounts positioned amidships. All the ships carried two rotating triple mounts for 550-millimeter (21.7 in) torpedo tubes, one mount between the two pairs of funnels as well as another aft of the rear funnel. A pair of depth charge chutes were built into their stern; these housed a total of sixteen 200-kilogram (440 lb) depth charges, with eight more in reserve. They were also fitted with four depth-charge throwers, two on each broadside abreast the forward pair of funnels, for which the ships carried a dozen 100-kilogram (220 lb) depth charges.

== Construction and career ==
After France surrendered to Germany in June 1940 during World War II, Gerfaut served with the navy of Vichy France. She was among the ships of the French fleet scuttled at Toulon, France, on 27 November 1942.
