= French destroyer Aigle =

Destroyer of the French Navy

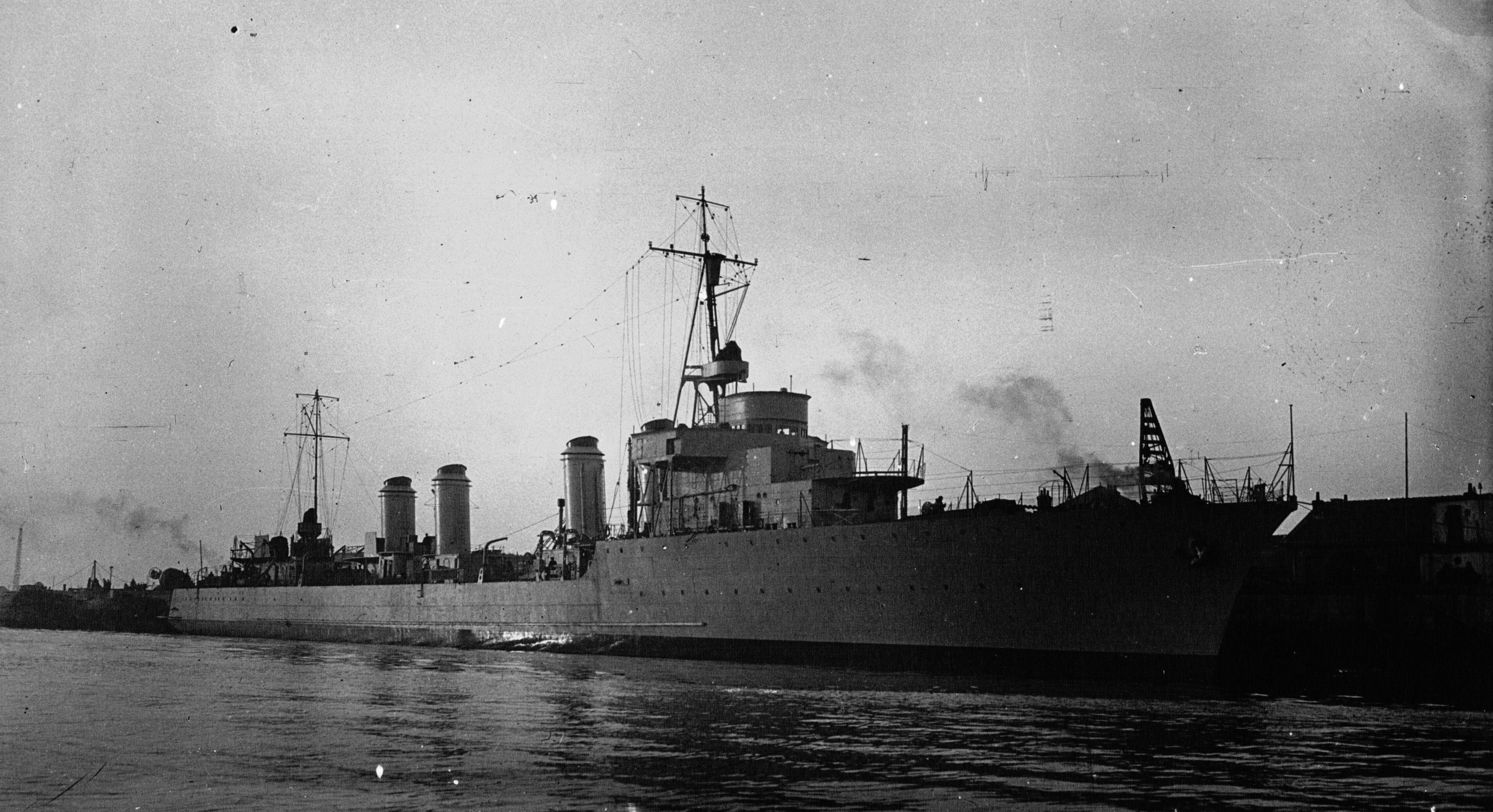
- Aigle shortly after being launched, 1931

History

France
- Name: Aigle
- Namesake: Eagle
- Builder: Ateliers et Chantiers de France, Dunkirk
- Launched: 19 February 1931
- Completed: 10 October 1932
- Fate: Scuttled, 27 November 1942

General characteristics
- Class & type: Aigle-class destroyer
- Displacement: 2,441 long tons (2,480 t) (standard)
- Length: 128.5 m (421 ft 7 in)
- Beam: 11.8 m (38 ft 9 in)
- Draught: 4.97 m (16 ft 4 in)
- Installed power: 4 du Temple boilers; 64,000 PS (47,000 kW; 63,000 shp)
- Propulsion: 2 shafts; 2 geared steam turbines
- Speed: 36 knots (67 km/h; 41 mph)
- Range: 3,650 nmi (6,760 km; 4,200 mi) at 18 knots (33 km/h; 21 mph)
- Crew: 10 officers, 217 crewmen (wartime)
- Armament: 5 × single 138.6 mm (5.5 in) guns; 4 × single 37 mm (1.5 in) AA guns; 2 × triple 550 mm (21.7 in) torpedo tubes; 2 chutes, 4 throwers for 36 depth charges

The French destroyer Aigle was the lead ship of her class of destroyers (contre-torpilleurs) built for the French Navy during the 1930s.

== Design and description ==
The Aigle-class ships were designed as improved versions of the preceding Guépard-class destroyers. They had an overall length of 128.5 meters (421 ft 7 in), a beam of 11.8 meters (38 ft 9 in), and a draft of 4.97 meters (16 ft 4 in). The ships displaced 2,441 long tons (2,480 t) at standard and 3,140 metric tons (3,090 long tons) at deep load. They were powered by two geared steam turbines, each driving one propeller shaft using steam provided by four du Temple boilers. The turbines were designed to produce 64,000 metric horsepower (47,000 kW; 63,000 shp), which would propel the ships at 36 knots (67 km/h; 41 mph). During her sea trials on 18 May 1932, Aigle's Parsons turbines provided 76,906 PS (56,564 kW; 75,854 shp) and she reached 38.6 knots (71.5 km/h; 44.4 mph) for a single hour. The ships carried enough fuel oil to give them a range of 3,650 nautical miles (6,760 km; 4,200 mi) at 18 knots (33 km/h; 21 mph). Their crew consisted of 10 officers and 198 crewmen in peacetime and 10 officers and 217 enlisted men in wartime.

The main armament of the Aigle-class ships consisted of five 138.6-millimeter (5.5 in) Modèle 1927 guns in single shielded mounts, one superfiring pair fore and aft of the superstructure and the fifth gun abaft the aft funnel. Their anti-aircraft armament consisted of four 37-millimeter (1.5 in) Modèle 1927 guns in single mounts positioned amidships. The ships carried two rotating triple mounts for 550-millimeter (21.7 in) torpedo tubes, one mount between the two pairs of funnels as well as another aft of the rear funnel. A pair of depth charge chutes were built into their stern; these housed a total of sixteen 200-kilogram (440 lb) depth charges, with eight more in reserve. They were also fitted with four depth-charge throwers, two on each broadside abreast the forward pair of funnels, for which the ships carried a dozen 100-kilogram (220 lb) depth charges.

== Service ==
During World War II, Aigle was engaged in operations to transport gold bars several times. In November 1939, she escorted Force 'Z' ships (the battleship Lorraine and two cruisers of the La Galissonnière class) until they reached the Atlantic. In March–April 1940, Aigle provided cover and later escorted the ships of Force 'X' back. Besides that, Aigle was regularly deployed to escort convoys with troops, heading from the North African ports to Marseille. The last combat operation in which the large destroyer participated was a raid on Genoa on the night of 13/14 June 1940, as part of Operation Vado, where she had to fend off the attacks of Italian torpedo boats.

After France surrendered to Germany in June 1940 during World War II, Aigle served with the navy of Vichy France. She was among the ships of the French fleet scuttled at Toulon, France, on 27 November 1942. Later refloated, she was sunk a second time at Toulon by United States Army Air Forces bombers on 24 November 1943. Her wreck later was again salvaged and scrapped.
