= French destroyer Épervier =

Destroyer of the French Navy

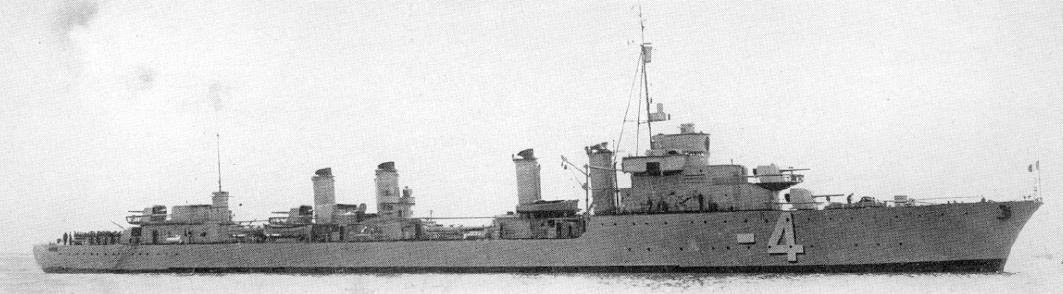
- Sister Milan at anchor

History

France
- Name: Épervier
- Namesake: Sparrowhawk
- Ordered: 1 July 1929
- Builder: Arsenal de Lorient
- Laid down: 18 August 1930
- Launched: 14 August 1931
- Completed: 1 April 1934
- Commissioned: 31 December 1933
- Fate: Beached, 9 November 1942

General characteristics
- Class & type: Aigle-class destroyer
- Displacement: 2,441 long tons (2,480 t) (standard)
- Length: 129.3 m (424 ft 3 in)
- Beam: 11.8 m (38 ft 9 in)
- Draught: 4.4 m (14 ft 5 in)
- Installed power: 2 du Temple boilers; 2 Thornycroft boilers; 64,000 PS (47,000 kW; 63,000 shp)
- Propulsion: 2 shafts; 2 geared steam turbines
- Speed: 36 knots (67 km/h; 41 mph)
- Range: 3,100 nmi (5,700 km; 3,600 mi) at 15 knots (28 km/h; 17 mph)
- Crew: 12 officers, 220 crewmen (wartime)
- Armament: 5 × single 138.6 mm (5.5 in) guns; 4 × single 37 mm (1.5 in) AA guns; 2 × twin 13.2 mm (0.52 in) machineguns; 1 × triple, 2 × twin 550 mm (21.7 in) torpedo tubes; 2 chutes and 4 throwers for 36 depth charges; 40 mines

Épervier was one of six Aigle-class destroyers (French: contre-torpilleurs) built for the French Navy during the 1930s. Together with her sister ship Milan, Épervier was to be built at the Arsenal de Lorient, but that shipyard was overloaded with work and construction of the two ships had to be postponed.

== Design and description ==
The Navy decided to take advantage of the situation to use them to test advanced propulsion machinery designed to use superheated steam and that the sisters would otherwise be built with the characteristics of the Vauquelin class. They had an overall length of 129.3 meters (424 ft 3 in), a beam of 11.8 meters (38 ft 9 in), and a draft of 4.97 meters (16 ft 4 in). The ships displaced 2,441 long tons (2,480 t) at standard load and 2,486 metric tons (2,447 long tons) at normal load. Their crew consisted of 10 officers and 201 crewmen in peacetime and 12 officers and 220 enlisted men in wartime.

Épervier was powered by two geared steam turbines, each driving one propeller shaft using steam provided by two du Temple boilers and two license-built Thornycroft boilers. Each boiler was fitted with a Thornycroft transverse superheater. The boilers operated at a pressure of 27 kg/cm^{2} (2,648 kPa; 384 psi) and a temperature of 325 °C (617 °F). The turbines were designed to produce 64,000 metric horsepower (47,000 kW; 63,000 shp) which was intended give the ships a speed of 36 knots (67 km/h; 41 mph). During her sea trials at normal load on 20 April 1933, the ship comfortably exceeded her designed speed, reaching 39.73 knots (73.58 km/h; 45.72 mph) from 72,826 PS (53,563 kW; 71,830 shp). Two weeks later Épervier achieved 43.05 knots (79.73 km/h; 49.54 mph) from 82,026 PS (60,330 kW; 80,904 shp) at her standard displacement. Use of the superheaters made the sisters more fuel efficient, increasing their range to 3,100 nautical miles (5,700 km; 3,600 mi) at 15 knots (28 km/h; 17 mph), 1 knot (1.9 km/h; 1.2 mph) faster and 100 nmi (190 km; 120 mi) further than their Vauquelin half-sisters.

The sisters were armed identically to their half-sisters; their main battery consisted of five 138.6-millimeter (5.5 in) Modèle 1927 guns in single shielded mounts, one superfiring pair fore and aft of the superstructure and the fifth gun abaft the rear funnel. Their anti-aircraft armament consisted of four 37-millimeter (1.5 in) Modèle 1927 guns in single mounts positioned amidships and two twin mounts for 13.2-millimeter (0.52 in) Hotchkiss Modèle 1929 machineguns on the forecastle deck abreast the bridge. The ships carried two above-water twin mounts for 550-millimeter (21.7 in) torpedo tubes, one pair on each broadside between each pair of funnels as well as one triple mount aft of the rear pair of funnels able to traverse to both sides. A pair of depth charge chutes were built into their stern; these housed a total of sixteen 200-kilogram (440 lb) depth charges, with eight more in reserve. They were also fitted with a pair of depth-charge throwers, one on each broadside abreast the aft funnels, for which they carried a dozen 100-kilogram (220 lb) depth charges. The ships could be fitted with rails to drop 40 Breguet B4 530-kilogram (1,170 lb) mines.

== Construction and career ==
Épervier was authorized as part of the 1927 Naval Program, but was not ordered from the Arsenal de Lorient until 1 July 1929. The ship was laid down on 18 August 1930, launched on 14 August 1931, commissioned on 31 December 1933 and completed on 1 April 1934.
