= French destroyer Albatros =

Destroyer of the French Navy

- Albatros beached off Casablanca, 16 November 1942

History

France
- Name: Albatros
- Namesake: Albatross
- Builder: Ateliers et Chantiers de la Loire, Nantes
- Launched: 27 June 1930
- Completed: 25 December 1931
- Fate: Scrapped, 9 September 1959

General characteristics
- Class & type: Aigle-class destroyer
- Displacement: 2,441 long tons (2,480 t) (standard)
- Length: 128.5 m (421 ft 7 in)
- Beam: 11.8 m (38 ft 9 in)
- Draught: 4.97 m (16 ft 4 in)
- Installed power: 4 du Temple boilers; 64,000 PS (47,000 kW; 63,000 shp)
- Propulsion: 2 shafts; 2 geared steam turbines
- Speed: 36 knots (67 km/h; 41 mph)
- Range: 3,650 nmi (6,760 km; 4,200 mi) at 18 knots (33 km/h; 21 mph)
- Crew: 10 officers, 217 crewmen (wartime)
- Armament: 5 × single 138.6 mm (5.5 in) guns; 4 × single 37 mm (1.5 in) AA guns; 2 × triple 550 mm (21.7 in) torpedo tubes; 2 chutes, 4 throwers for 36 depth charges

The French destroyer Albatros was one of six Aigle-class destroyer (contre-torpilleurs) built for the French Navy during the 1930s.

== Design and description ==
The Aigle-class ships were designed as improved versions of the preceding Guépard-class destroyers. They had an overall length of 128.5 meters (421 ft 7 in), a beam of 11.8 meters (38 ft 9 in), and a draft of 4.97 meters (16 ft 4 in). The ships displaced 2,441 long tons (2,480 t) at standard and 3,140 metric tons (3,090 long tons) at deep load. Albatros was powered by two Parsons geared steam turbines, each driving one propeller shaft using steam provided by four du Temple boilers. The turbines were designed to produce 64,000 metric horsepower (47,000 kW; 63,000 shp), which would propel the ships at 36 knots (67 km/h; 41 mph). During her sea trials on 30 April 1931, Albatros reached 40.44 knots (74.89 km/h; 46.54 mph) for a single hour. The ships carried enough fuel oil to give them a range of 3,650 nautical miles (6,760 km; 4,200 mi) at 18 knots (33 km/h; 21 mph). Their crew consisted of 10 officers and 198 crewmen in peacetime and 10 officers and 217 enlisted men in wartime.

The main armament of the Aigle-class ships consisted of five 138.6-millimeter (5.5 in) Modèle 1927 guns in single shielded mounts, one superfiring pair fore and aft of the superstructure and the fifth gun abaft the aft funnel. Albatros's anti-aircraft armament consisted of a 75-millimeter (3 in) M1897-15 gun forward of the rear pair of funnels and four semi-automatic 37-millimeter (1.5 in) Modèle 1927 guns in single mounts positioned amidships. All the ships carried two rotating triple mounts for 550-millimeter (21.7 in) torpedo tubes, one mount between the two pairs of funnels as well as another aft of the rear funnel. A pair of depth charge chutes were built into their stern; these housed a total of sixteen 200-kilogram (440 lb) depth charges, with eight more in reserve. They were also fitted with four depth-charge throwers, two on each broadside abreast the forward pair of funnels, for which the ships carried a dozen 100-kilogram (220 lb) depth charges.

== Construction and career ==
During World War II, on 14 June 1940 she participated in Operation Vado, a raid of French cruisers and destroyers from Toulon to bombard Italian targets at Genoa and Savona; the coastal battery "Mameli" struck her with one 152 mm (6 in) round, which penetrated her fire-room and killed twelve sailors. After France surrendered to Germany, Albatros served with the naval forces of Vichy France. She was at Casablanca in French Morocco when Allied forces invaded French North Africa in Operation Torch in November 1942. Resisting the invasion, she was badly damaged off Casablanca on 8 November 1942 in action with United States Navy forces during the Naval Battle of Casablanca when she came under fire from the heavy cruisers USS Augusta, USS Wichita, and USS Tuscaloosa and then was bombed by aircraft from the escort carrier USS Suwanee. Badly damaged, she was beached in a sinking condition. After World War II, she was repaired and returned to service.
