= French destroyer Milan =

Destroyer of the French Navy

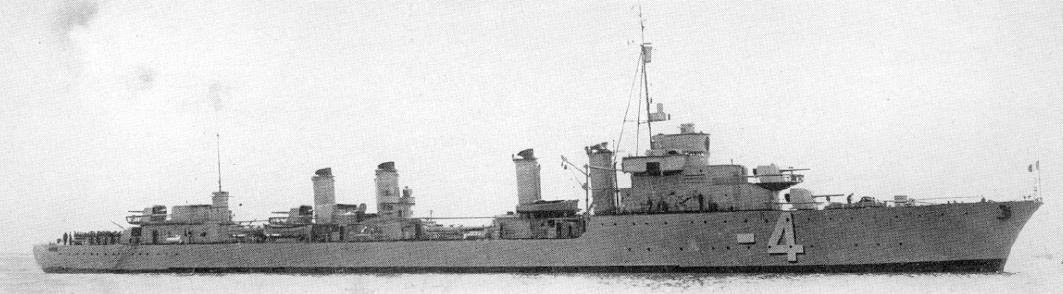
- Milan at anchor

History

France
- Name: Milan
- Namesake: Kite
- Ordered: 1 July 1929
- Builder: Arsenal de Lorient
- Laid down: 1 December 1930
- Launched: 13 October 1931
- Completed: 20 April 1934
- Commissioned: 31 December 1933
- In service: 18 May 1934
- Fate: Run aground after being struck by USS Massachusetts on 8 November 1942. Wreck scrapped post-war.

General characteristics
- Class & type: Aigle-class destroyer
- Displacement: 2,441 long tons (2,480 t) (standard)
- Length: 129.3 m (424 ft 3 in)
- Beam: 11.8 m (38 ft 9 in)
- Draught: 4.4 m (14 ft 5 in)
- Installed power: 2 du Temple boilers; 2 Yarrow boilers; 64,000 PS (47,000 kW; 63,000 shp)
- Propulsion: 2 shafts; 2 geared steam turbines
- Speed: 36 knots (67 km/h; 41 mph)
- Range: 3,100 nmi (5,700 km; 3,600 mi) at 15 knots (28 km/h; 17 mph)
- Crew: 12 officers, 220 crewmen (wartime)
- Armament: 5 × single 138.6 mm (5.5 in) guns; 4 × single 37 mm (1.5 in) AA guns; 2 × twin 13.2 mm (0.52 in) machineguns; 1 × triple, 2 × twin 550 mm (21.7 in) torpedo tubes; 2 chutes and 4 throwers for 36 depth charges; 40 mines

The French destroyer Milan was one of six Aigle-class destroyer (contre-torpilleurs) built for the French Navy during the 1930s. Together with her sister ship Épervier, Milan was to be built at the Arsenal de Lorient, but that shipyard was overloaded with work and construction of the two ships had to be postponed. Completed in 1934, Milan participated in the Second World War and was wrecked in the Naval Battle of Casablanca in November 1942 during Operation Torch, the Allied invasion of French North Africa.

== Design and description ==
The Navy decided to take advantage of the situation to use them to test advanced propulsion machinery designed to use superheated steam and that the sisters would otherwise be built with the characteristics of the Vauquelin class. They had an overall length of 129.3 meters (424 ft 3 in), a beam of 11.8 meters (38 ft 9 in), and a draft of 4.97 meters (16 ft 4 in). The ships displaced 2,441 long tons (2,480 t) at standard load and 2,486 metric tons (2,447 long tons) at normal load. Their crew consisted of 10 officers and 201 crewmen in peacetime and 12 officers and 220 enlisted men in wartime.

Milan was powered by two geared steam turbines, each driving one propeller shaft using steam provided by two du Temple boilers and two license-built Yarrow boilers. Each boiler was fitted with a Yarrow transverse superheater. The boilers operated at a pressure of 27 kg/cm^{2} (2,648 kPa; 384 psi) and a temperature of 325 °C (617 °F). The turbines were designed to produce 64,000 metric horsepower (47,000 kW; 63,000 shp) which was intended give the ships a speed of 36 knots (67 km/h; 41 mph). During her sea trials at normal load on 2 August 1933, the ship comfortably exceeded her designed speed, reaching 38.72 knots (71.71 km/h; 44.56 mph) from 72,518 PS (53,337 kW; 71,526 shp). Four weeks later Milan achieved 42.46 knots (78.64 km/h; 48.86 mph) from 79,796 PS (58,690 kW; 78,704 shp) at her standard displacement. Use of the superheaters made the sisters more fuel efficient, increasing their range to 3,100 nautical miles (5,700 km; 3,600 mi) at 15 knots (28 km/h; 17 mph), 1 knot (1.9 km/h; 1.2 mph) faster and 100 nmi (190 km; 120 mi) further than their Vauquelin half-sisters.

The sisters were armed identically to their half-sisters; their main battery consisted of five 138.6-millimeter (5.5 in) Modèle 1927 guns in single shielded mounts, one superfiring pair fore and aft of the superstructure and the fifth gun abaft the rear funnel. Their anti-aircraft armament consisted of four 37-millimeter (1.5 in) Modèle 1927 guns in single mounts positioned amidships and two twin mounts for 13.2-millimeter (0.52 in) Hotchkiss Modèle 1929 machineguns on the forecastle deck abreast the bridge. The ships carried two above-water twin mounts for 550-millimeter (21.7 in) torpedo tubes, one pair on each broadside between each pair of funnels as well as one triple mount aft of the rear pair of funnels able to traverse to both sides. A pair of depth charge chutes were built into their stern; these housed a total of sixteen 200-kilogram (440 lb) depth charges, with eight more in reserve. They were also fitted with a pair of depth-charge throwers, one on each broadside abreast the aft funnels, for which they carried a dozen 100-kilogram (220 lb) depth charges. The ships could be fitted with rails to drop 40 Breguet B4 530-kilogram (1,170 lb) mines.

== Construction and career ==
Milan was authorized as part of the 1927 Naval Program, but was not ordered from the Arsenal de Lorient until 1 July 1929. The ship was laid down on 1 December 1930, launched on 13 October 1931, commissioned on 31 December 1933 and completed on 20 April 1934.

Following the German invasion of Norway in April 1940, Milan escorted two convoys carrying French troops of the Chasseurs Alpins to Namsos and Harstad between 18 April and 27 April. On 3–4 May 1940, Milan, together with the French destroyers Chevalier Paul and Tartu and the British destroyers Sikh and Tartar, made a sweep into the Skagerrak, but encountered no German shipping.

On 15 June she carried General de Gaulle from Brest to Plymouth on the first stage of his journey to London for talks with the British government.

After France surrendered to Germany, Milan served with the naval forces of Vichy France. She was at Casablanca in French Morocco when Allied forces invaded French North Africa in Operation Torch on 8 November 1942. She was in action against United States Navy TF 34 during the Naval Battle of Casablanca and was beached after sustaining a shell hit from USS Massachusetts (BB-59), and possibly other US ships. Older work on the subject have errantly attributed Milan's crippling to shell hits from the destroyer Wilkes, which had broken off action against Milan at least 25 minutes prior to the French ship being knocked out of the fight (which occurred shortly before 10:00), but French reports consistently list a 406mm (16 inch) shell among the damage Milan incurred, in addition to two more shells, probably 8 inch, that struck her immediately thereafter. Milan was underway at the time of the 16 inch hit, and if historian Vincent O’Hara and the museum Battleship Cove are correct in their interpretations of Massachusetts' log and their corresponding French records, this hit would qualify as the longest ship-to-ship hit by a battleship in history at between 26,000-28,000 yards.
