= Aigle-class destroyer =

French naval warships (1932–1959)

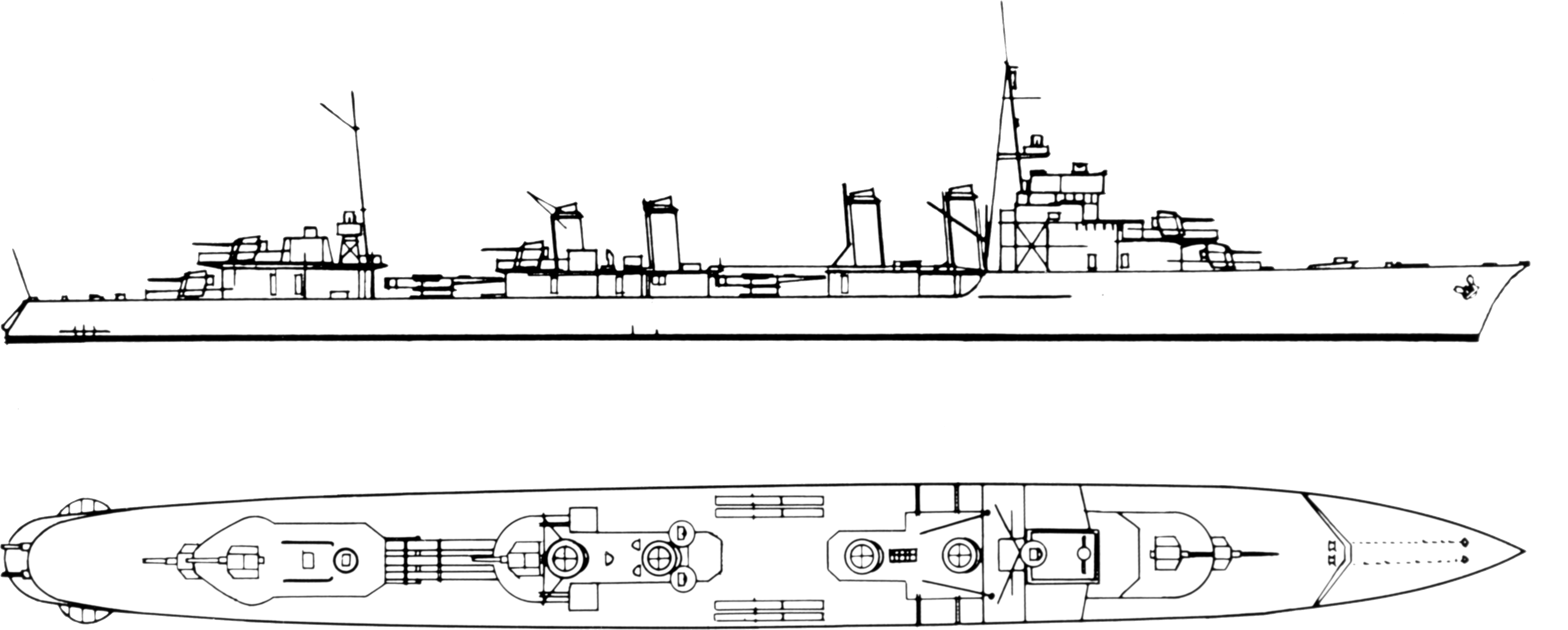
- Aigle-class destroyer

Class overview
- Name: Aigle class
- Operators: French Navy
- Preceded by: Guépard class
- Succeeded by: Vauquelin class
- Subclasses: Épervier
- Built: 1928–1934
- Completed: 6
- Scrapped: 1

General characteristics (as built)
- Type: Destroyer
- Displacement: 2,441 long tons (2,480 t) (standard); 3,140 t (3,090 long tons) (full load)
- Length: 128.5 m (421 ft 7 in)
- Beam: 11.8 m (38 ft 9 in)
- Draught: 4.97 m (16 ft 4 in)
- Installed power: 4 du Temple boilers; 64,000 PS (47,000 kW; 63,000 shp)
- Propulsion: 2 shafts; 2 geared steam turbines
- Speed: 36 knots (67 km/h; 41 mph)
- Range: 3,650 nmi (6,760 km; 4,200 mi) at 18 knots (33 km/h; 21 mph)
- Crew: 10 officers, 217 crewmen (wartime)
- Armament: 5 × single 138.6 mm (5.5 in) guns; 1 × single 75 mm (3 in) AA gun; 4 × single 37 mm (1.5 in) AA guns; 2 × triple 550 mm (21.7 in) torpedo tubes; 2 × depth charge racks, 4 × throwers for 36 depth charges

The Aigle-class destroyers (contre-torpilleurs) were built for the French Navy during the 1930s.

== Design and description ==
The Aigle-class ships were improved versions of the preceding Guépard class. They had an overall length of 129.3 meters (424 ft 3 in), a beam of 11.8 meters (38 ft 9 in), and a draft of 4.97 meters (16 ft 4 in). The ships displaced 2,441 long tons (2,480 t) at standard load and 3,140 metric tons (3,090 long tons) at deep load. They had a metacentric height of 0.8 m (2 ft 7 in) and their hull was divided by a dozen transverse bulkheads into 13 watertight compartments. Their crew consisted of 10 officers and 198 crewmen in peacetime and 10 officers and 217 enlisted men in wartime.

The ships were powered by two geared steam turbines, each driving one propeller shaft using steam provided by four du Temple boilers that operated at a pressure of 20 kg/cm^{2} (1,961 kPa; 284 psi) and a temperature of 215 °C (419 °F). The turbines were designed to produce 64,000 metric horsepower (47,000 kW; 63,000 shp) which was intended give the ships a speed of 36 knots (67 km/h; 41 mph). They comfortably exceeded their designed speed; the fastest of the ships, Gerfaut, reached a speed of 41.46 knots (76.78 km/h; 47.71 mph) from 84,436 PS (62,103 kW; 83,281 shp) during her sea trials. The Aigles carried 540 t (530 long tons) of fuel oil which gave them a range of 3,650 nautical miles (6,760 km; 4,200 mi) at 18 knots (33 km/h; 21 mph).

The main battery of the Aigle class consisted of five 138.6-millimeter (5.5 in) Modèle 1927 guns in single shielded mounts, one superfiring pair fore and aft of the superstructure and the fifth gun abaft the rear funnel. Their anti-aircraft armament consisted of four 37-millimeter (1.5 in) Modèle 1927 guns in single mounts positioned amidships. In addition Gerfaut and Albatros were initially fitted with a 75-millimeter (3 in) M1897-15 gun forward of the rear pair of funnels, but this was removed by the end of 1932. All the ships carried two rotating triple mounts for 550-millimeter (21.7 in) torpedo tubes, one mount between the two pairs of funnels as well as another aft of the rear funnel. A pair of depth charge chutes were built into their stern; these housed a total of sixteen 200-kilogram (440 lb) depth charges, with eight more in reserve. They were also fitted with four depth-charge throwers, two on each broadside abreast the forward pair of funnels, for which the ships carried a dozen 100-kilogram (220 lb) depth charges.

== Ships ==
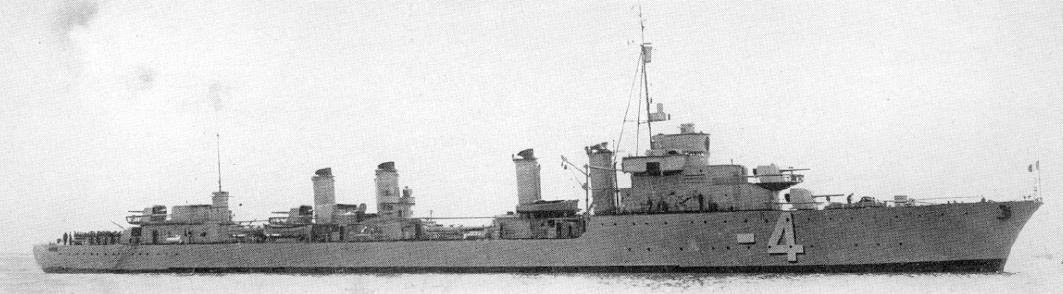
Milan c. 1936

- Aigle (Eagle; pennant numbers 5, 6 and X13)

Built by Ateliers et Chantiers de France, Dunkirk
Launched 19 February 1931
Completed 10 October 1932
Scuttled 27 November 1942
Refloated 10 July 1943.
Bombed and sunk 24 November 1943
Broken up in situ 1952.

- Vautour (Vulture; pennant numbers 6, 5, 73, X71)

Built by Forges et Chantiers de la Méditerranée, La Seyne
Launched 26 August 1930
Completed 2 May 1932
Scuttled 27 November 1942
Refloated 17 January 1943
Bombed and sunk 4 February 1944
Broken up in situ 1951

- Albatros (3, 2, 5, 72, X73, X77, F762, D614)

built by Ateliers et Chantiers de la Loire, Nantes
Launched 27 June 1930
Completed 25 December 1931
Decommissioned 9 September 1959

- Gerfaut (Gyrfalcon - 4, 71, X72)

Built by Ateliers et Chantiers de Bretagne, Nantes
Launched 14 June 1930
Completed 30 January 1932
Scuttled 27 November 1942
Refloated 1 June 1943.
Partly scrapped June–September 1943
Hulk bombed and sunk 7 March 1944
Broken up in situ 1948

- Milan (Kite - 1, 4, X113, X111)

Built by Arsenal de Lorient
Launched 13 October 1931
Completed 20 April 1934 -
On 8 November 1942, off Casablanca, she was hit by 16-inch (400 mm) shells from the US fleet and had to be beached.

- Épervier (Sparrowhawk - 2, 5, X112)

Built by Arsenal de Lorient,
Launched 14 August 1931
Completed 1 April 1934 -
On 9 November 1942 she was sunk by HMS Aurora off Oran. She was raised, and eventually broken up in 1946.

== Service history ==
Three of the ships (Albatros, Épervier and Milan) were stationed in Morocco as part of the Vichy French navy, and engaged Allied forces in the battle of Casablanca during Operation Torch. Along with the unfinished battleship Jean Bart, they engaged the Allied 'Covering Group', a taskforce based on the battleship USS Massachusetts. Milan and Épervier both ran aground after being damaged in the battle; Albatros was damaged but, after her capture, was repaired after the war and used as a gunnery training vessel. Aigle was scuttled at Toulon, France, on 27 November 1942. She was later refloated and sunk a second time by United States Army Air Forces bombers on 24 November 1943. Later she was salvaged and scrapped. Vautour and Gerfaut were also scuttled at Toulon, but Vautour was raised again and sunk during an air raid on 4 February 1944.
