= Canon de 37 mm Modèle 1925 =

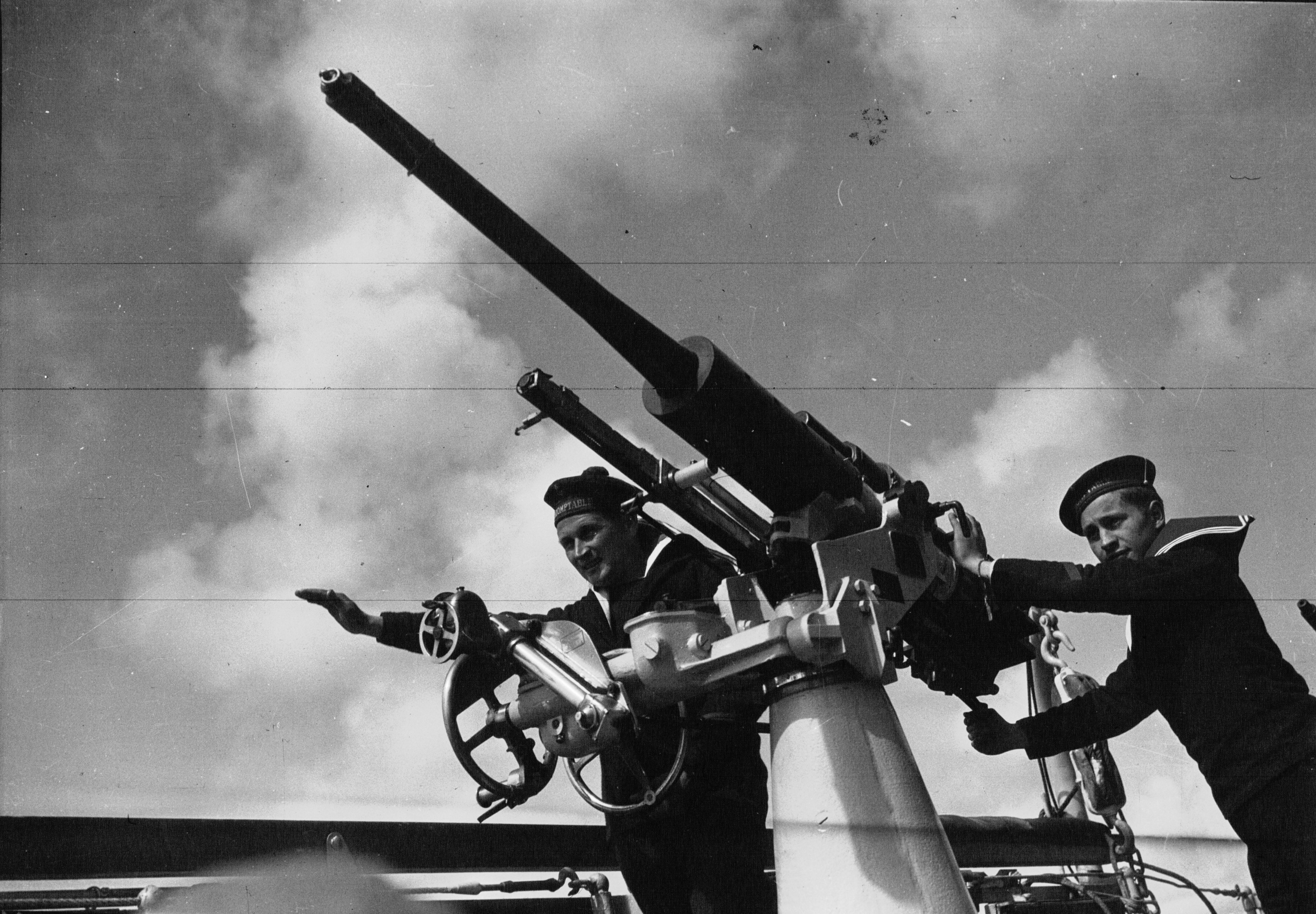
- Canon de 37 modèle 1925 on the French destroyer L'Indomptable in 1936.
- Type: Anti-aircraft gun
- Place of origin: France

Service history
- Used by: France
- Wars: World War II

Production history
- Designed: 1925
- Produced: 1925
- Variants: Modèle 1933

Specifications
- Mass: 300 kg (660 lb)
- Length: 2 m (6 ft 7 in)
- Barrel length: 1.8 m (5 ft 11 in) (50-caliber)
- Shell: 37 × 278 mmR
- Shell weight: .72 kg (1.6 lb)
- Caliber: 37 millimeters (1.5 in)
- Action: Semi-automatic
- Elevation: −15° to +80°
- Traverse: 360°
- Rate of fire: 15-21 rpm
- Muzzle velocity: 810 m/s (2,700 ft/s)
- Effective firing range: 5,400 m (5,900 yd) at +45°
- Maximum firing range: 7,000 m (7,700 yd) at +45°

The Canon de 37 mm Modèle 1925 was a widely used family of French anti-aircraft guns used by the French Navy during World War II.

== Design and construction ==
The Modèle 1925 was a single gun mount while the later Modèle 1933 was a twin mount. Both were hand-loaded, semi-automatic guns with a low rate of fire compared to their clip-fed contemporaries. A combination of low rate of fire, low projectile weight and small numbers of guns per ship led to a reputation of it being a poor anti-aircraft weapon.

Ship classes that carried Modèle 1925 & Modèle 1933 include:

- Aigle-class destroyers
- Bougainville-class avisos
- Bourrasque-class destroyers
- Chacal-class destroyers
- Dunkerque-class battleships
- Duquesne-class cruisers
- Guépard-class destroyers
- L'Adroit-class destroyers
- La Melpomène-class torpedo boats
- Le Fantasque-class destroyers
- Le Fier-class torpedo boats
- Mogador-class destroyers
- Richelieu-class battleships
- Suffren-class cruisers
- Vauquelin-class destroyers

== Comparison of anti-aircraft guns ==
| Country | Gun Model | RPM | Projectile Weight | Weight of fire |
|---|---|---|---|---|
| France | Canon de 37 mm Modèle 1925 | 15-21 | .72 kg (1.6 lb) | 10.8–15.12 kg (23.8–33.3 lb) |
| Nazi Germany | 3.7 cm SK C/30 | 30 | .74 kg (1.6 lb) | 22.2 kg (49 lb) |
| Italy | Cannone-Mitragliera da 37/54 (Breda) | 60-120 | .82 kg (1.8 lb) | 49.2–98.4 kg (108–217 lb) |
| United States | 37 mm Gun M1 | 120 | .61 kg (1.3 lb) | 73.2 kg (161 lb) |
| Nazi Germany | 3.7 cm Flak 18/36/37/43 | 150 | .64 kg (1.4 lb) | 96 kg (212 lb) |
| Soviet Union | 37 mm automatic air defense gun M1939 (61-K) | 80 | .73 kg (1.6 lb) | 58.4 kg (129 lb) |
| United Kingdom | QF 2-pounder naval gun | 115 | .91 kg (2.0 lb) | 104.6 kg (231 lb) |
| Sweden | Bofors 40 mm gun | 120 | .9 kg (2.0 lb) | 108 kg (238 lb) |

== Career ==
Ships of the Free French Navy refitted in the United States during World War II had these guns replaced by 40 mm Bofors and 20 mm Oerlikon guns. Ships of the Vichy French Navy continued to carry the Canon de 37 mm Modèle 1925 until the remnants of that force were captured or scuttled during 1942. Ships salvaged by the Germans and Italians also replaced this gun with their equivalents.

== Bibliography ==
- Campbell, John (1985). Naval Weapons of World War Two. Annapolis, Maryland: Naval Institute Press. ISBN 0-87021-459-4.
- Jordan, John & Moulin, Jean (2015). French Destroyers: Torpilleurs d'Escadre & Contre-Torpilleurs 1922–1956. Barnsley, UK: Seaforth Publishing. ISBN 978-1-84832-198-4.
