= French destroyer Vauquelin (1932) =

French lead ship of Vauquelin-class

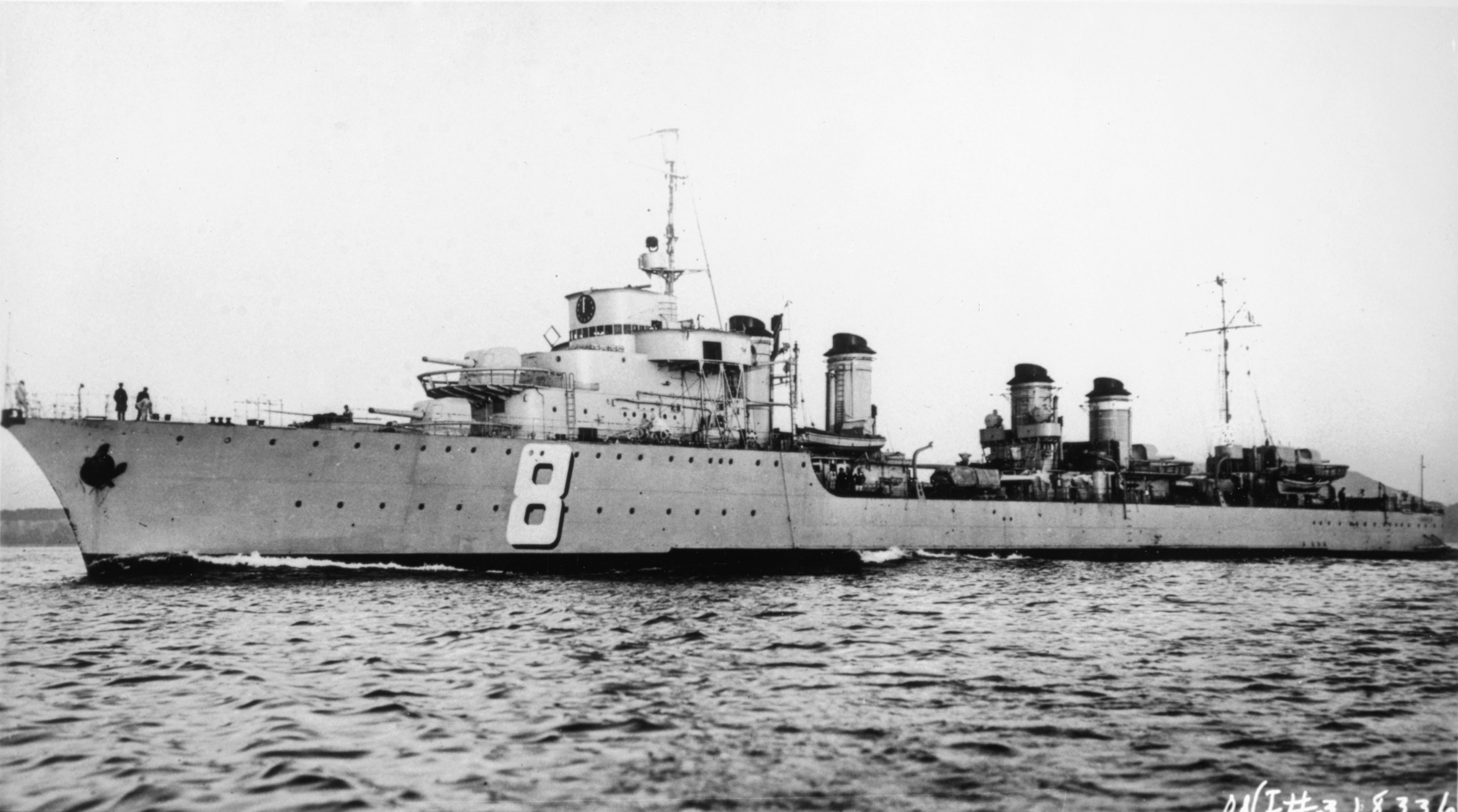
- Vauquelin in 1934

History

France
- Name: Vauquelin
- Namesake: Jean Vauquelin
- Ordered: 1 February 1930
- Builder: Ateliers et Chantiers de France, Dunkirk
- Laid down: 13 March 1930
- Launched: 29 September 1932
- Completed: 3 November 1933
- Commissioned: 1 June 1933
- In service: 28 March 1934
- Fate: Scuttled, 27 November 1942

General characteristics
- Class & type: Vauquelin-class destroyer
- Displacement: 2,441 t (2,402 long tons) (standard); 3,120 t (3,070 long tons) (deep load)
- Length: 129.3 m (424 ft 3 in)
- Beam: 11.8 m (38 ft 9 in)
- Draft: 4.97 m (16 ft 4 in)
- Installed power: 4 du Temple boilers; 64,000 PS (47,000 kW; 63,000 shp)
- Propulsion: 2 shafts; 2 geared steam turbines
- Speed: 36 knots (67 km/h; 41 mph)
- Range: 3,000 nmi (5,600 km; 3,500 mi) at 14 knots (26 km/h; 16 mph)
- Crew: 12 officers, 224 crewmen (wartime)
- Armament: 5 × single 138.6 mm (5.5 in) guns; 4 × single 37 mm (1.5 in) anti-aircraft guns; 2 × twin 13.2 mm (0.52 in) anti-aircraft machineguns; 1 × triple, 2 × twin 550 mm (21.7 in) torpedo tubes; 2 chutes and 2 throwers for 36 depth charges; 40 mines

Vauquelin was the lead ship of her class of six large destroyers (contre-torpilleurs) built for the French Navy (Marine Nationale) during the 1930s. The ship entered service in 1934 and spent most of her career in the Mediterranean. During the Spanish Civil War of 1936–1939, she was one of the ships that helped to enforce the non-intervention agreement. When France declared war on Germany in September 1939, all of the Vauquelins were assigned to the High Sea Forces (Forces de haute mer (FHM)) which was tasked to escort French convoys and support the other commands as needed. Vauquelin escorted a pair of heavy cruisers to French West Africa, but otherwise remained in the Mediterranean for the duration of the war.

The Vichy French reformed the FHM after the French surrender in June. She ferried ammunition to French Lebanon after it was invaded by the Allied forces in June 1941 and then unsuccessfully attempted to transport reinforcements there the following month. Vauquelin was scuttled in Toulon when the Germans occupied Vichy France in November 1942. Damaged during an Allied air raid, the ship was not significantly salvaged during the war and her wreck was broken up in 1951.

== Design and description ==
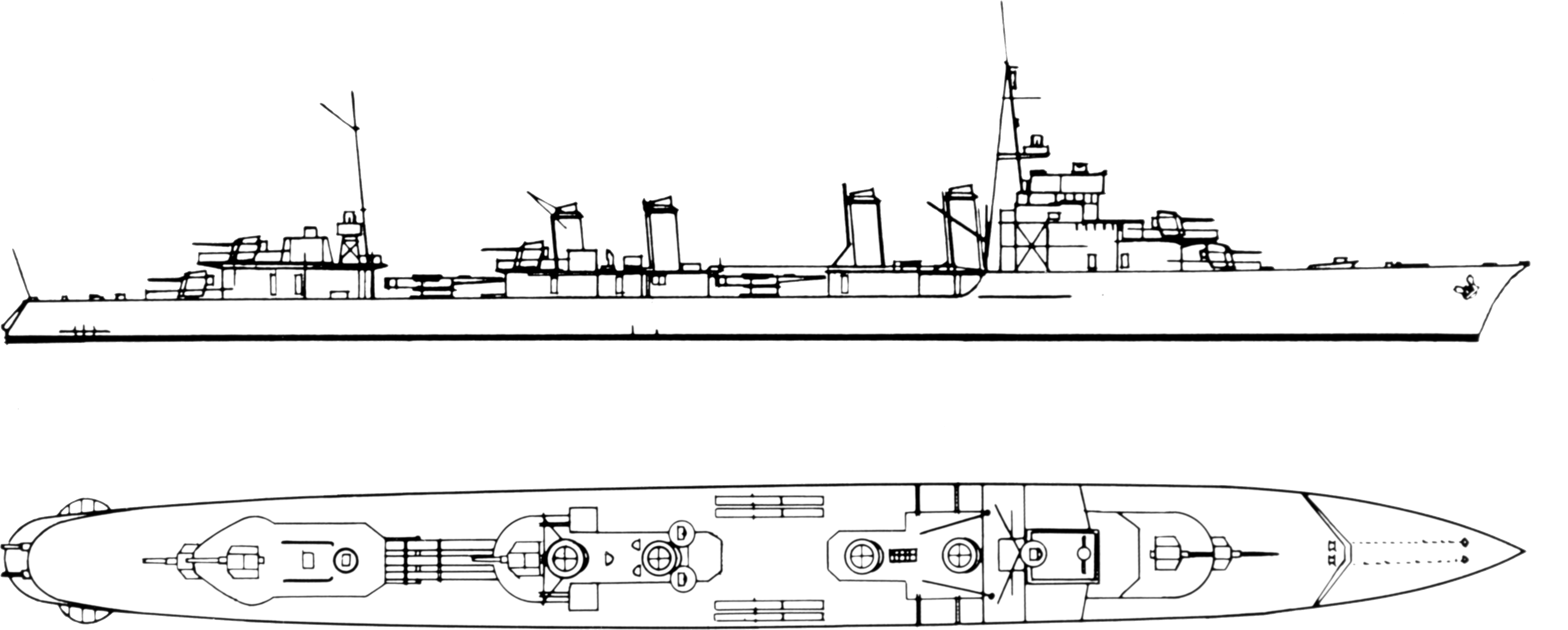
Right elevation and plan of the Vauquelin class

The Vauquelin-class ships were designed as improved versions of the preceding Aigle-class destroyers. They had an overall length of 129.3 meters (424 ft 3 in), a beam of 11.8 meters (38 ft 9 in), and a draft of 4.97 meters (16 ft 4 in). The ships displaced 2,441 metric tons (2,402 long tons) at standard and 3,120 metric tons (3,070 long tons) at deep load. They were powered by two geared steam turbines, each driving one propeller shaft, using steam provided by four du Temple boilers. The turbines were designed to produce 64,000 metric horsepower (47,000 kW; 63,000 shp), which would propel the ships at 36 knots (67 km/h; 41 mph). During her sea trials on 7 April 1933, Vauquelin's Parsons turbines provided 79,846 PS (58,727 kW; 78,754 shp) and she reached 39.7 knots (73.5 km/h; 45.7 mph) for a single hour. The ships carried enough fuel oil to give them a range of 3,000 nautical miles (5,600 km; 3,500 mi) at 14 knots (26 km/h; 16 mph). Their crew consisted of 10 officers and 201 crewmen in peacetime and 12 officers and 220 enlisted men in wartime.

The main armament of the Vauquelin-class ships consisted of five 138.6-millimeter (5.5 in) Modèle 1927 guns in single shielded mounts, one superfiring pair fore and aft of the superstructure and the fifth gun abaft the aft funnel. Their anti-aircraft armament consisted of four 37-millimeter (1.5 in) Modèle 1927 guns in single mounts positioned amidships and two twin mounts for 13.2-millimeter (0.52 in) Hotchkiss Modèle 1929 anti-aircraft machineguns on the forecastle deck abreast the bridge. The ships carried two above-water twin mounts for 550-millimeter (21.7 in) torpedo tubes, one pair on each broadside between each pair of funnels as well as one triple mount aft of the rear pair of funnels able to traverse to both sides. A pair of depth charge chutes were built into their stern; these housed a total of sixteen 200-kilogram (440 lb) depth charges, with eight more in reserve. They were also fitted with a pair of depth-charge throwers, one on each broadside abreast the aft funnels, for which they carried a dozen 100-kilogram (220 lb) depth charges. The ships could be fitted with rails to drop 40 Breguet B4 530-kilogram (1,170 lb) mines.

=== Modifications ===
The depth-charge throwers were removed in 1936 and more 200-kilogram depth charges were carried in their place. The ship's 13.2-millimeter machineguns were repositioned in front of the bridge in early 1939. The four single 37-millimeter mounts aboard Vauquelin were replaced by a pair of twin mounts in May 1940. The Navy reconsidered its anti-submarine warfare tactics after the war began in September and reinstated the pair of depth-charge throwers, although these were an older model than the one previously installed. Vauquelin received hers in June 1940 and she was fitted with a British Alpha 128 ASDIC system later in December. A pair of Browning 13.2-millimeter AA machineguns were installed abaft the mainmast in late 1940–early 1941. During the ship's 6 August – 7 September anti-aircraft refit, the mainmast was replaced by a platform for the two 37-millimeter twin-gun mounts and a single Browning, the Hotchkiss machine guns were moved to new platforms between the funnels and their former positions were occupied by new Brownings.

== Construction and career ==
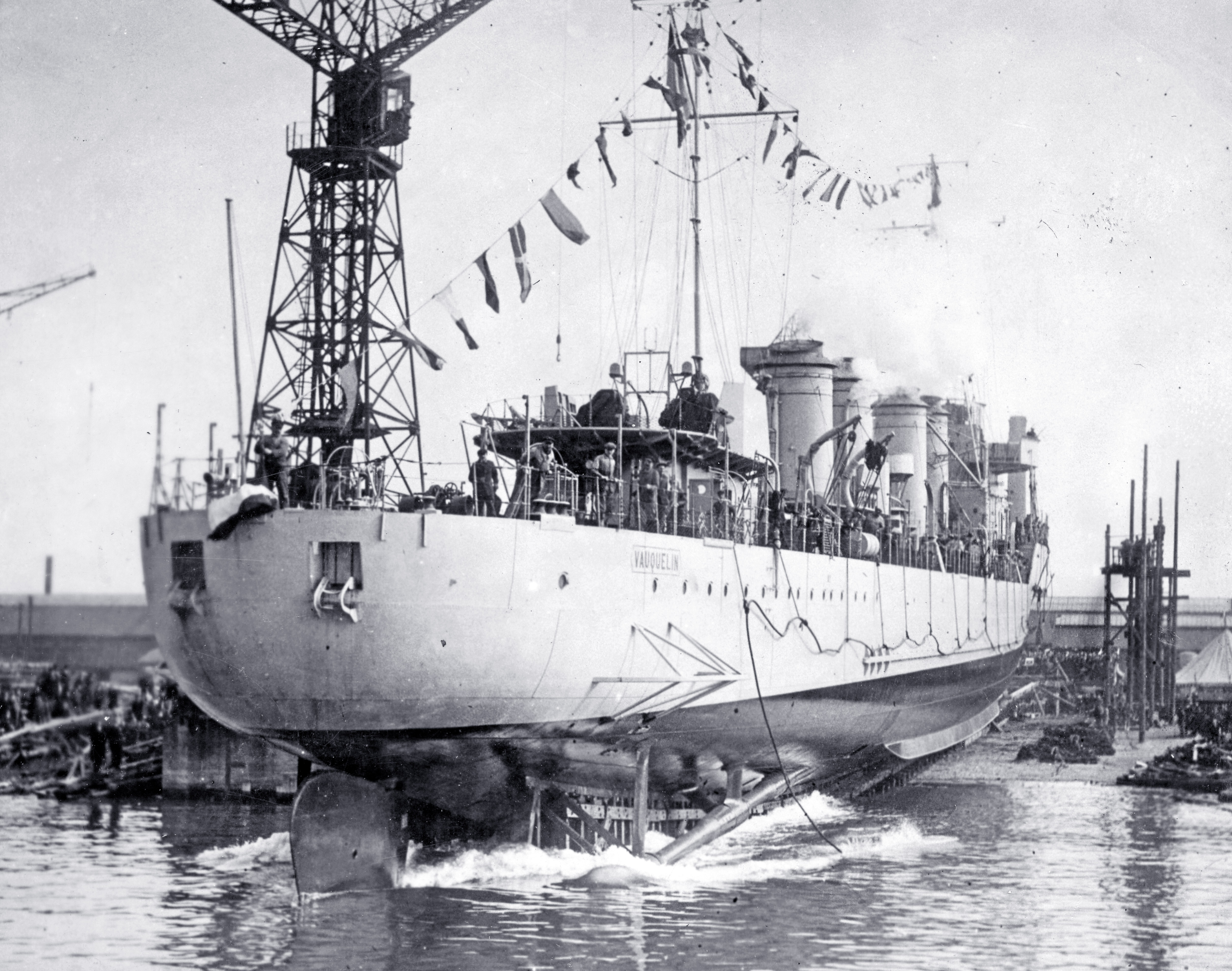
Vauquelin being launched, 29 September 1932

Vauquelin, named after Jean Vauquelin, was ordered on 1 February 1930 from Ateliers et Chantiers de France as part of the 1929 Naval Program. She was laid down at their Dunkirk shipyard on 13 March 1930, launched on 29 September 1932, commissioned on 3 November 1933 and entered service on 28 March 1934. Her entry into service was delayed for several months by a damaged propeller and she then struck a rock during her sea trials that damaged her hull plating for a length of 40 m (131 ft).

When the Vauquelins entered service they were assigned to the 5th and the newly formed 6th Light Divisions (Division légère (DL)) which were later redesignated as scout divisions (Division de contre-torpilleurs). Vauquelin and her sister ships Kersaint and Maillé Brézé were assigned to the 6th DL of the 2nd Light Squadron (2^{e} Escadre légère of the 2nd Squadron (2^{e} Escadre), based in Brest. From 5 August to 23 September 1934, Vauquelin visited Saint Pierre and Miquelon, Halifax and Quebec to commemorate the 400th anniversary of the explorer Jacques Cartier's first visit to Canada. Shortly after her return, the 6th DL was transferred to the group of large destroyers (Groupe de contre-torpilleurs (GCT) of the 1st Squadron (1^{e} Escadre) in Toulon in October and it was renumbered as the 9th. On 27 June 1935, all of the Vauquelins, except Cassard, participated in a naval review conducted by the Navy Minister (Ministre de la Marine) François Piétri in the Baie de Douarnenez after combined maneuvers by the 1st and 2nd Squadrons.

After the start of the Spanish Civil War in July 1936, the contre-torpilleurs and destroyers in the Mediterranean were assigned to assist French citizens in Spain and to patrol the surveillance zones assigned to France on a monthly rotation beginning on 24 September as part of the non-intervention agreement. The GCT reverted to its previous designation of the 3rd Light Squadron on 15 September. As of 1 October Vauquelin, Tartu and Chevalier Paul were assigned to the 5th Light Division while Kersaint, Maillé Brézé and Cassard belonged to the 9th, both of which were assigned to the Mediterranean Squadron as the 1st Squadron was now known. In May–June 1938 the Mediterranean Squadron cruised the Eastern Mediterranean; the squadron was redesignated as the Mediterranean Fleet (Flotte de la Méditerranée) on 1 July 1939.

On 27 August 1939, in anticipation of war with Nazi Germany, the French Navy planned to reorganize the Mediterranean Fleet into the FHM of three squadrons. When France declared war on 3 September, the reorganization was ordered and the 3rd Light Squadron, which included the 5th and 9th Scout Divisions with all of the Vauquelin-class ships, was assigned to the 3rd Squadron. In mid-October Vauquelin and Maillé Brézé escorted the heavy cruisers Algérie and Dupleix to Dakar, French West Africa, and then escorted a convoy back home. The 5th Scout Division with Vauquelin, Chevalier Paul and Tartu was tentatively assigned to Force Z that would have been formed in early 1940 to support the Finns during the Winter War against the Soviets if the Finns hadn't been forced to sign the Moscow Peace Treaty in March. Three days after the French surrender on 22 June, all of the Vauquelins were stationed in Toulon, except for Kersaint in Mers-el-Kébir, French Algeria.

The Vichy French government reestablished the FHM on 25 September after it negotiated rules limiting the force's activities and numbers with the Italian and German Armistice Commissions. Vauquelin, Tartu and Chevalier Paul were assigned to the FHM on 15 November. After the Allies invaded Lebanon and Syria on 8 June 1941, Admiral François Darlan, Minister of War and National Defense in the Vichy government, ordered Chevalier Paul to carry ammunition for the French ships in Beirut, French Lebanon, departing on 11 June. He had requested permission to do so via radio message which the British decoded and alerted them to the ship's mission and route. Chevalier Paul was sunk during the early morning of 16 June by torpedo bombers based in Cyprus and Vauquelin was dispatched the following day, carrying 800 rounds of 138.6 mm ammunition. Undetected by the British, she reached Beirut on the 21st, but was damaged the following day by three Bristol Blenheim bombers from the Royal Air Force's 11 Squadron that hit the ship six times, killing five crewmen and wounding seventeen.

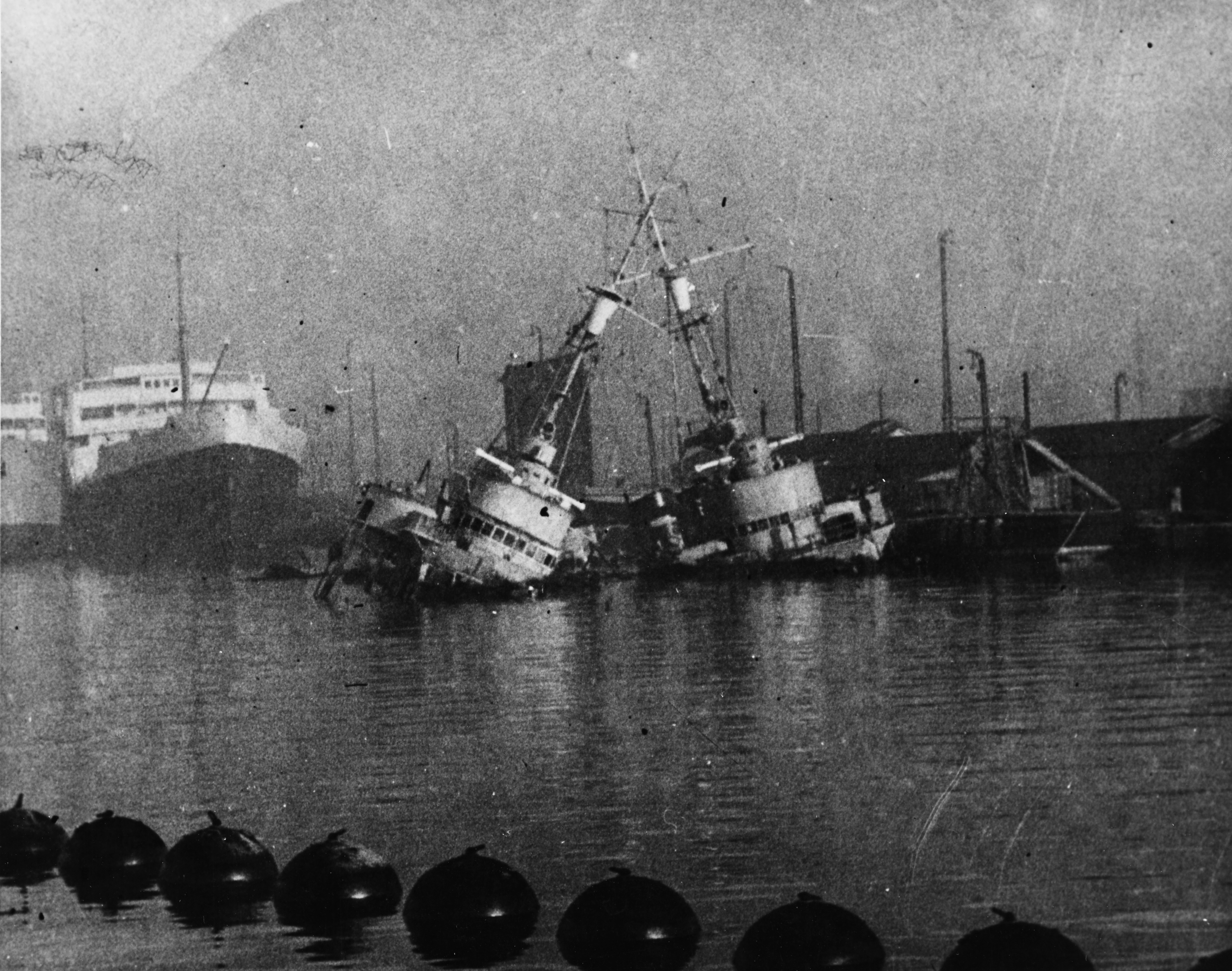
Vauquelin (left) and Kersaint after being scuttled in Toulon on 27 November 1942

Vauquelin and the other two contre-torpilleurs, Guépard and Valmy originally based in Beirut, sailed on 29 June, bound for Thessaloniki in Axis-controlled Greece. They loaded 450 men from a battalion of Algerian Light Infantry (Tirailleurs algériens) and 90 t (89 long tons) of supplies as reinforcements for Lebanon. The ships departed on 5 July, but were spotted by a British reconnaissance aircraft en route and returned to Thessaloniki on the 9th in accordance with their orders to turn back if spotted. All three arrived at Toulon on 22 July.

Vauquelin was transferred to Algiers, French Algeria, in early December to prepare to escort the damaged battleship Dunkerque back to Toulon in February 1942. After the Allies invaded French North Africa on 8 November, the Germans attempted to capture the French ships in Toulon intact on 27 November, but the ship was scuttled by her crew. She settled to the harbor bottom and took on a list. Little effort was made to salvage her before she was struck by a bomb. Her wreck was broken up in place in 1951.
