= French destroyer Tartu (1931) =

French Vauquelin-class destroyer

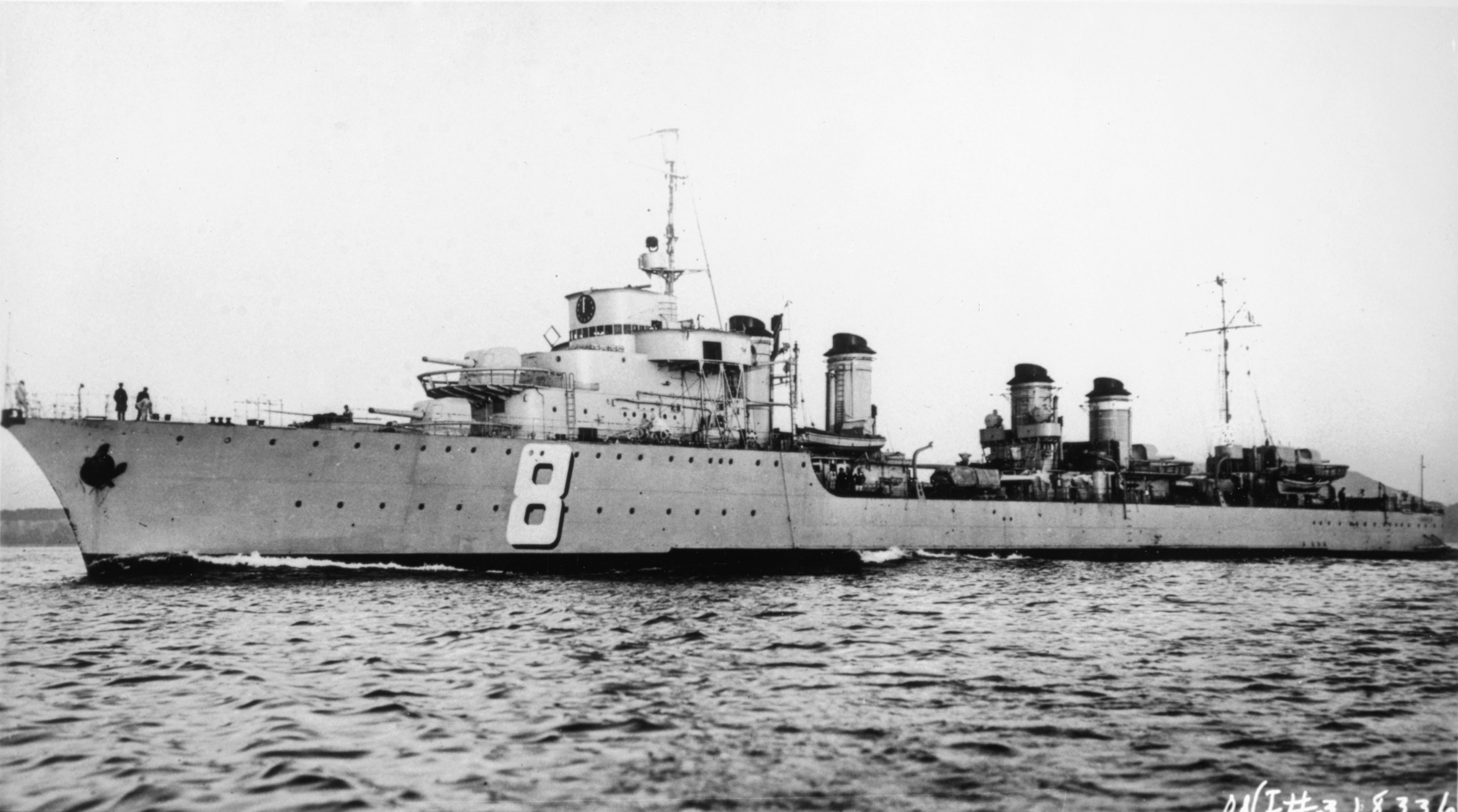
- Sister ship Vauquelin, about 1934

History

France
- Name: Tartu
- Namesake: Jean-François Tartu
- Ordered: 1 February 1930
- Builder: Ateliers et Chantiers de la Loire, Saint-Nazaire
- Laid down: 14 September 1930
- Launched: 7 December 1931
- Completed: 31 December 1932
- In service: 8 February 1933
- Fate: Scuttled, 27 November 1942

General characteristics
- Class & type: Vauquelin-class destroyer
- Displacement: 2,441 t (2,402 long tons) (standard); 3,120 t (3,070 long tons) (deep load)
- Length: 129.3 m (424 ft 3 in)
- Beam: 11.8 m (38 ft 9 in)
- Draft: 4.97 m (16 ft 4 in)
- Installed power: 4 du Temple boilers; 64,000 PS (47,000 kW; 63,000 shp)
- Propulsion: 2 shafts; 2 geared steam turbines
- Speed: 36 knots (67 km/h; 41 mph)
- Range: 3,000 nmi (5,600 km; 3,500 mi) at 14 knots (26 km/h; 16 mph)
- Crew: 12 officers, 224 crewmen (wartime)
- Armament: 5 × single 138.6 mm (5.5 in) guns; 4 × single 37 mm (1.5 in) anti-aircraft guns; 2 × twin 13.2 mm (0.52 in) anti-aircraft machineguns; 1 × triple, 2 × twin 550 mm (21.7 in) torpedo tubes; 2 chutes and 2 throwers for 36 depth charges; 40 mines

Tartu was one of six Vauquelin-class destroyers (contre-torpilleurs) built for the French Navy during the 1930s. The ship entered service in 1933 and spent most of her career in the Mediterranean. During the Spanish Civil War of 1936–1939, she was one of the ships that helped to enforce the non-intervention agreement. When France declared war on Germany in September 1939, all of the Vauquelins were assigned to the High Sea Forces (Forces de haute mer (FHM)) which was tasked to escort French convoys and support the other commands as needed. Tartu was briefly deployed to Scotland in early 1940 to support the Allied forces in the Norwegian Campaign, but returned to the Mediterranean in time to participate in Operation Vado, a bombardment of Italian coastal facilities after Italy entered the war in June.

The Vichy French reformed the FHM after the French surrender in June. The ship was scuttled in Toulon when the Germans occupied Vichy France in November 1942. She was not significantly salvaged during the war and her wreck was broken up in 1956.

== Design and description ==
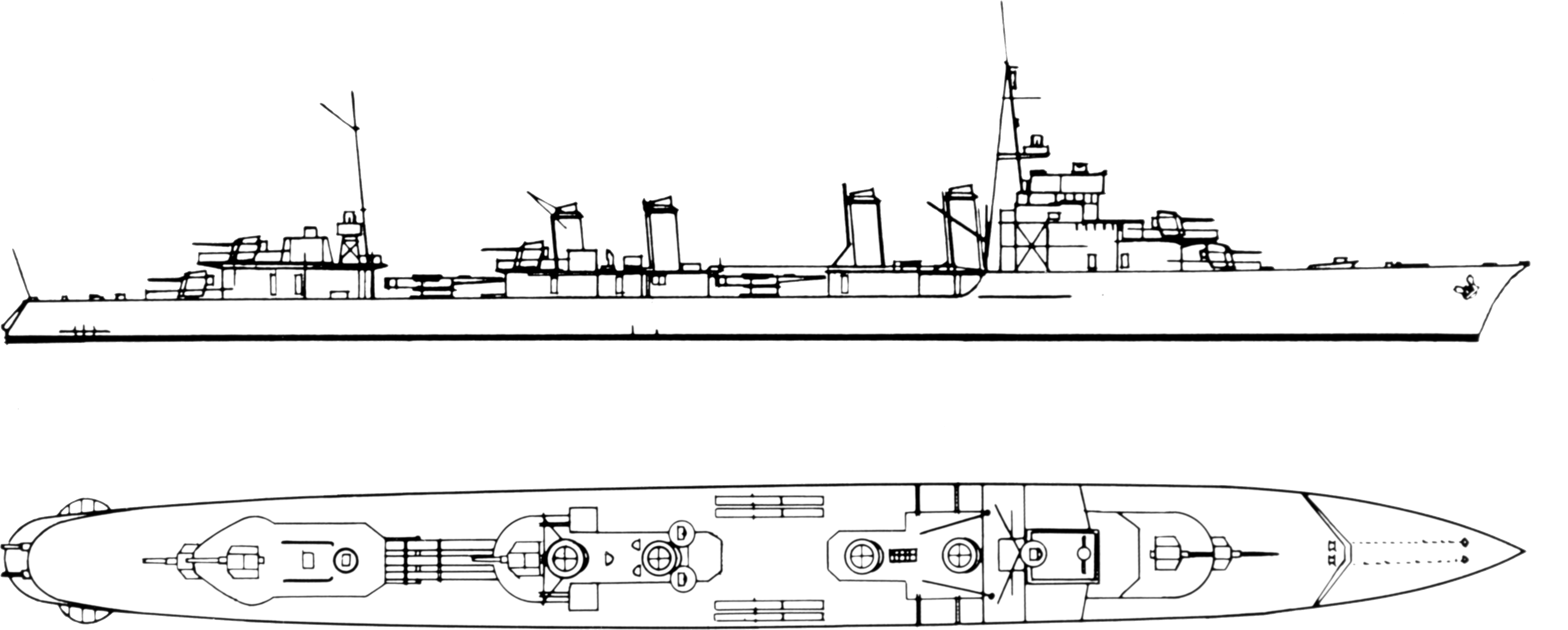
Right elevation and plan of the Vauquelin class

The Vauquelin-class ships were designed as improved versions of the preceding Aigle-class destroyers. They had an overall length of 129.3 meters (424 ft 3 in), a beam of 11.8 meters (38 ft 9 in), and a draft of 4.97 meters (16 ft 4 in). The ships displaced 2,441 metric tons (2,402 long tons) at standard and 3,120 metric tons (3,070 long tons) at deep load. They were powered by two geared Zoelly steam turbines, each driving one propeller shaft, using steam provided by four du Temple boilers. The turbines were designed to produce 64,000 metric horsepower (47,000 kW; 63,000 shp), which would propel the ships at 36 knots (67 km/h; 41 mph). During her sea trials on 24 August 1932, Tartu's turbines provided 72,790 PS (53,540 kW; 71,790 shp) and she reached 39.9 knots (73.9 km/h; 45.9 mph) for a single hour. The ships carried enough fuel oil to give them a range of 3,000 nautical miles (5,600 km; 3,500 mi) at 14 knots (26 km/h; 16 mph). Their crew consisted of 10 officers and 201 crewmen in peacetime and 12 officers and 220 enlisted men in wartime.

The main armament of the Vauquelin-class ships consisted of five 138.6-millimeter (5.5 in) Modèle 1927 guns in single shielded mounts, one superfiring pair fore and aft of the superstructure and the fifth gun abaft the aft funnel. Their anti-aircraft armament consisted of four 37-millimeter (1.5 in) Modèle 1927 guns in single mounts positioned amidships and two twin mounts for 13.2-millimeter (0.52 in) Hotchkiss Modèle 1929 anti-aircraft machineguns on the forecastle deck abreast the bridge. The ships carried two above-water twin mounts for 550-millimeter (21.7 in) torpedo tubes, one pair on each broadside between each pair of funnels as well as one triple mount aft of the rear pair of funnels able to traverse to both sides. A pair of depth charge chutes were built into their stern; these housed a total of sixteen 200-kilogram (440 lb) depth charges, with eight more in reserve. They were also fitted with a pair of depth-charge throwers, one on each broadside abreast the aft funnels, for which they carried a dozen 100-kilogram (220 lb) depth charges. The ships could be fitted with rails to drop 40 Breguet B4 530-kilogram (1,170 lb) mines.

=== Modifications ===
The depth-charge throwers were removed in 1936 and more 200-kilogram depth charges were carried in their place. The Navy reconsidered its anti-submarine warfare tactics after the war began in September and intended to reinstate the depth-charge throwers, although these were an older model than the one previously installed; Tartu had not received her as of early 1942. As an interim measure, a pair of rails were installed on the stern for 35-kilogram (77 lb) depth charges. Each rail could accommodate three depth charges and ten more were stored in the magazine. During the ship's mid-1941 anti-aircraft refit, the mainmast was replaced by a platform for a single 37-millimeter twin-gun mount and two of her single 37-millimeter mounts were transferred to the platform while the other two single mounts were removed. The Hotchkiss machineguns were on new platforms between the funnels and a pair of Browning 13.2-millimeter AA machineguns were installed in front of the bridge. Tartu received a British Alpha 128 ASDIC system in October 1941 that had been taken from another ship.

== Construction and career ==
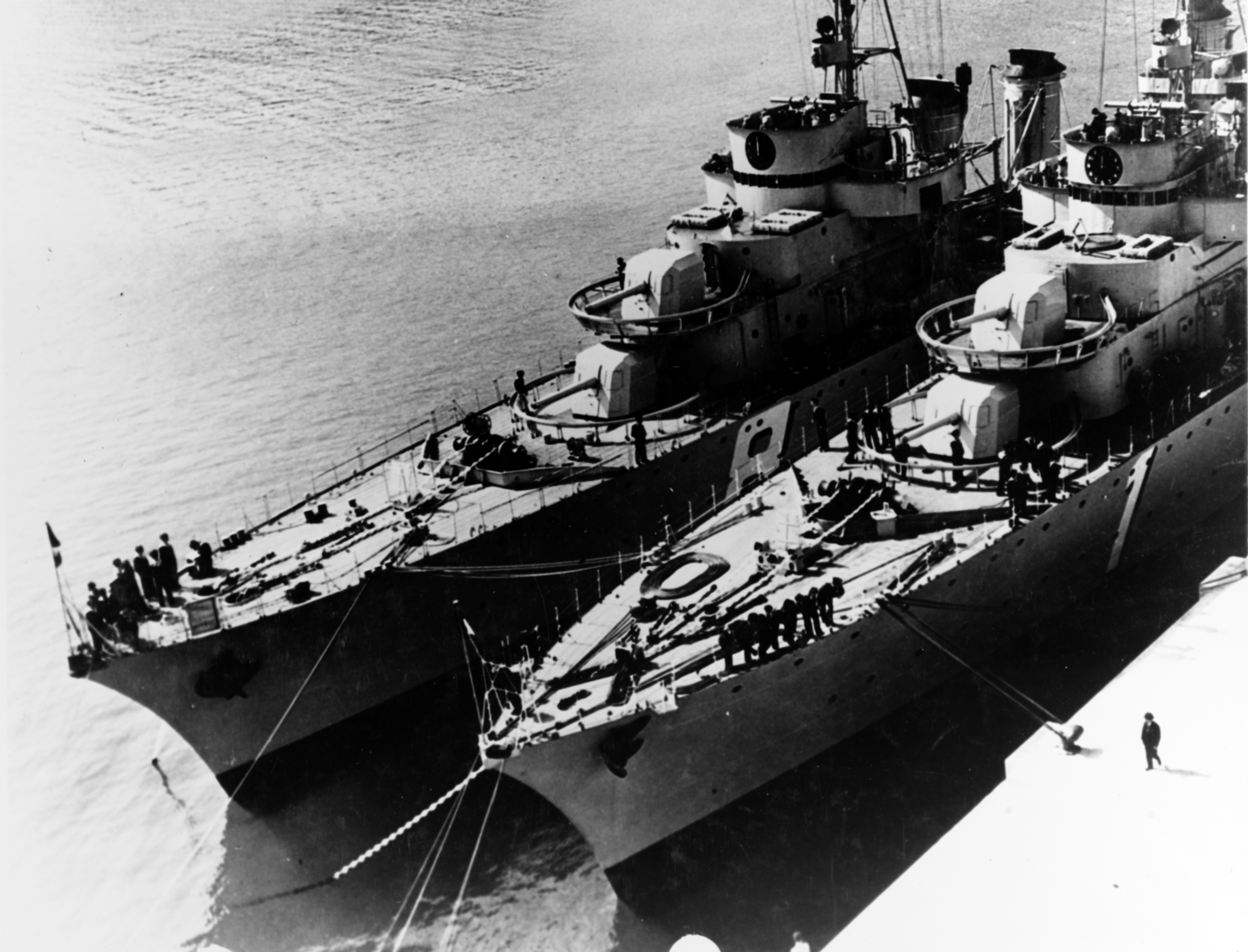
Elevated view of Tartu (right) and Vauquelin docked in Monte Carlo about 1935

Tartu, named after Jean-François Tartu, was ordered on 1 February 1930 from Ateliers et Chantiers de la Loire as part of the 1929 Naval Program. She was laid down at their Saint-Nazaire shipyard on 14 September 1930, launched on 7 December 1931, commissioned on 1 October 1932 and entered service on 8 February 1933. She was the only ship of her class to be completed on schedule.

When the Vauquelins entered service they were assigned to the 5th and the newly formed 6th Light Divisions (Division légère (DL)) which were later redesignated as scout divisions (Division de contre-torpilleurs). Tartu and her sister ships Chevalier Paul and Cassard were assigned to the 5th DL of the group of large destroyers (Groupe de contre-torpilleurs (GCT) of the 3rd Squadron (3^{e} Escadre), based in Toulon. Tartu served as the flagship of the GCT, which reverted to its previous designation of the 3rd Light Squadron on 15 September 1936, until relieved by her sister Maillé Brézé on 12 October 1938. On 27 June 1935, all of the Vauquelins, except Cassard, participated in a naval review conducted by the Navy Minister (Ministre de la Marine) François Piétri in the Baie de Douarnenez after combined maneuvers by the 1st and 2nd Squadrons.

After the start of the Spanish Civil War in July 1936, the contre-torpilleurs and destroyers in the Mediterranean were assigned to assist French citizens in Spain and to patrol the surveillance zones assigned to France on a monthly rotation beginning on 24 September as part of the non-intervention agreement. As of 1 October Tartu was the flagship of Rear Admiral (Contre-amiral) Emmanuel Ollive while still assigned to the 5th Light Division together with her sisters Chevalier Paul and Vauquelin. Her other sisters Kersaint, Maillé Brézé and Cassard belonged to the 9th Light Division, both of which were assigned to the Mediterranean Squadron. In May–June 1938 the Mediterranean Squadron cruised the Eastern Mediterranean; the squadron was redesignated at the Mediterranean Fleet (Flotte de la Méditerranée) on 1 July 1939.

=== World War II ===
On 27 August 1939, in anticipation of war with Nazi Germany, the French Navy planned to reorganize the Mediterranean Squadron into the FHM of three squadrons. When France declared war on 3 September, the reorganization was ordered and the 3rd Light Squadron, which included the 5th and 9th Scout Divisions with all of the Vauquelin-class ships, was assigned to the 3rd Squadron which was transferred to Oran, French Algeria, on 3 September. On 5 April 1940, the 5th Scout Division with Chevalier Paul, Tartu and Maillé Brézé was assigned to Force Z in anticipation of an Allied invasion of Norway; their mission was to escort convoys between Scotland and Norway. The German invasion on 9 April preempted the Allies and Tartu did not begin her escort duties until mid-April when she covered Convoy FP-1 transporting the 5th Demi-Brigade of Mountain Infantry (5^{e} Demi-Brigade de Chasseurs alpins) to participate in the Namsos Campaign on 19 April. On 24–27 April, the ship escorted Convoy FP-2 conveying the 27th Demi-Brigade of Mountain Infantry to Harstad, Norway, to join the Battle of Narvik. On 3–4 May she joined Chevalier Paul, the destroyer Milan and the British destroyers HMS Sikh and HMS Tartar in an unsuccessful attempt to intercept a German convoy. The 5th Scout Division returned to Toulon on 27 May as the Mediterranean Fleet was developing plans to attack the Italians in case they decided to join the war. After the Italians declared war on 10 June, the fleet planned to bombard installations on the Italian coast. Tartu and the rest of the 5th Scout Division were among the ships ordered to attack targets in Vado Ligure. The destroyer was tasked to bombard the Nafta oil tanks. Two Italian MAS boats on patrol attempted to attack the French ships, but only one was able to launch a torpedo before they were driven off with light damage by the French defensive fire. Damage assessments afterward revealed that little damage had been inflicted despite expending over 1,600 rounds of all calibers during the bombardment.

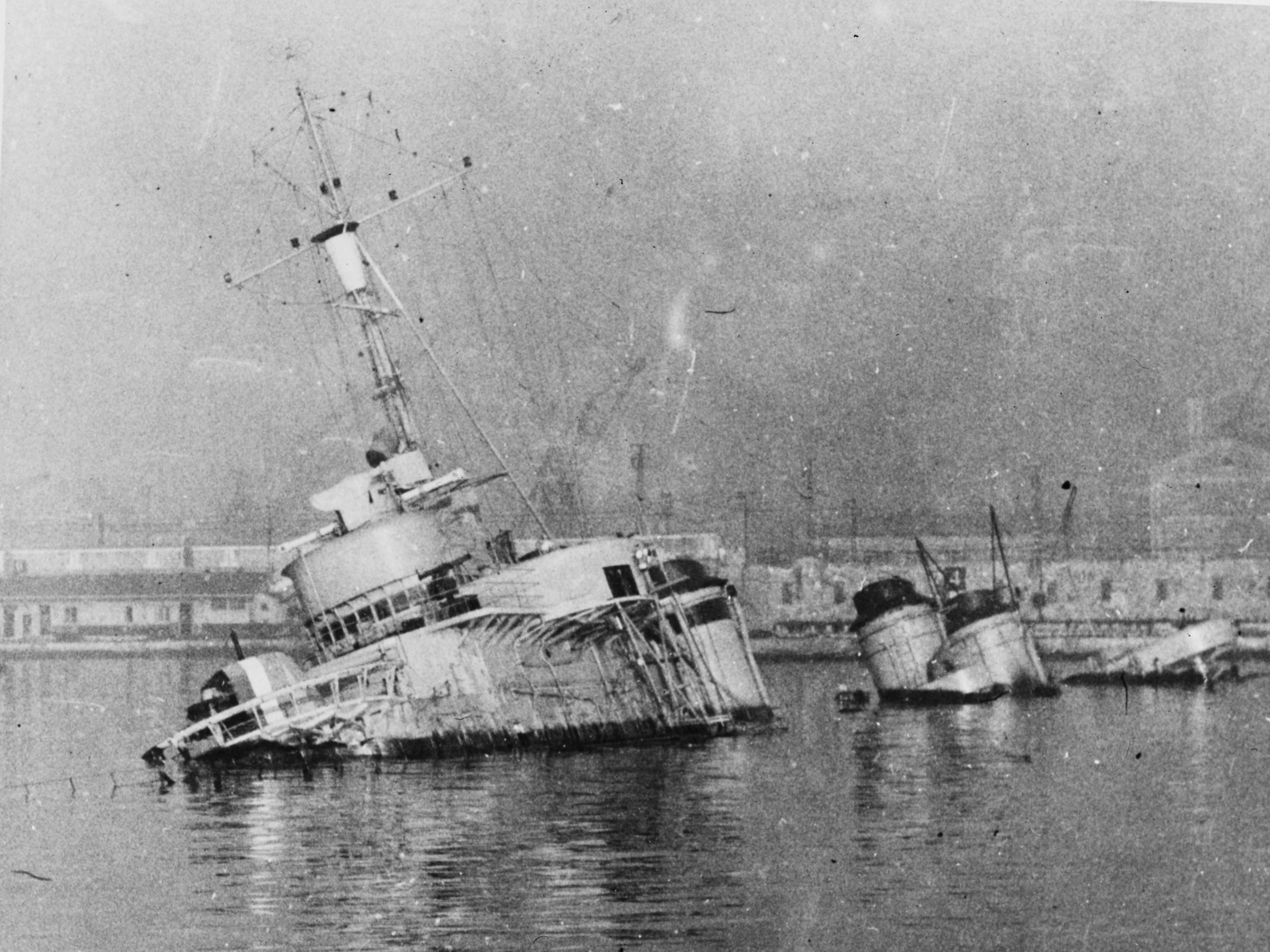
Tartu after she had been scuttled

After the French surrender on 22 June, the Royal Navy attacked the ships in Mers-el-Kébir, French Algeria, on 3 July to prevent them from being turned over to the Germans. To avoid an attack on the ships based nearby in Oran, they steamed for Toulon and Tartu was one of the ships that rendezvoused with them en route and escorted them to Toulon. The Vichy French reformed the FHM on 25 September after it negotiated rules limiting the force's activities and numbers with the Italian and German Armistice Commissions. Tartu was in reserve until she was assigned to it on 15 November. After the Allies invaded French Lebanon and Syria in June 1941, Tartu, Cassard and the heavy cruiser Foch transported a battalion of infantry from Algiers, French Algeria, to Marseille that was intended to reinforce the Levant between 30 June and 1 July. Shortly afterwards, Tartu began a refit that lasted from 4 July to 4 August. The ship was transferred to Algiers, French Algeria, in early December to prepare to escort the damaged battleship Dunkerque back to Toulon in February 1942. After the Allies invaded French North Africa on 8 November, the Germans attempted to capture the French ships in Toulon intact on 27 November, but the ship was scuttled by her crew. Tartu settled to the harbor bottom and took on a list; salvage attempts were abandoned on 11 December 1943. Her wreck was struck by bombs during three Allied air raids in March–April 1944 during the war and her wreck was broken up in 1956.
