= French ship Tartu =

At least three ships of the French Navy have been named Tartu:

- French frigate Tartu (1793), a frigate launched in 1788 as Uranie and renamed in 1793, she was captured by the Royal Navy in 1797
- French destroyer Tartu (1931), a Vauquelin-class destroyer launched in 1931 and scuttled in 1942
- French destroyer Tartu (D636), a T 53-class destroyer launched in 1955 and expended as a target in 1998
