= French destroyer Chevalier Paul (1932) =

French Vauquelin-class destroyer

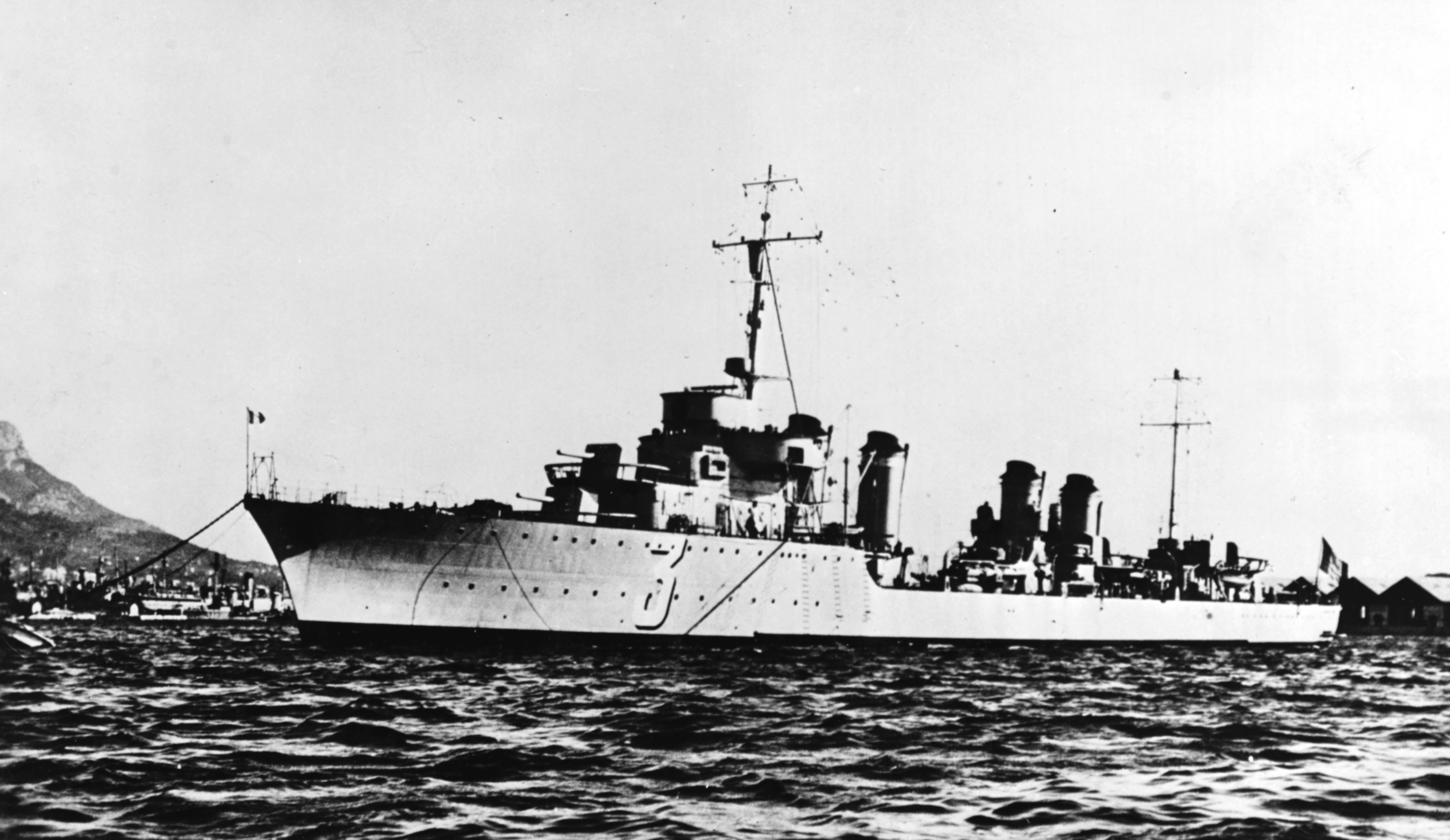
- Chevalier Paul moored to a buoy, about 1934

History

France
- Name: Chevalier Paul
- Namesake: Chevalier Paul
- Ordered: 1 February 1930
- Builder: Forges et Chantiers de la Méditerranée, La Seyne-sur-Mer
- Cost: 56,500,000 Francs
- Laid down: 28 February 1931
- Launched: 21 March 1932
- Completed: 20 July 1934
- In service: 24 August 1934
- Fate: Sunk by aircraft, 16 June 1941

General characteristics
- Class & type: Vauquelin-class destroyer
- Displacement: 2,441 t (2,402 long tons) (standard); 3,120 t (3,070 long tons) (deep load)
- Length: 129.3 m (424 ft 3 in)
- Beam: 11.8 m (38 ft 9 in)
- Draft: 4.97 m (16 ft 4 in)
- Installed power: 4 du Temple boilers; 64,000 PS (47,000 kW; 63,000 shp)
- Propulsion: 2 shafts; 2 geared steam turbines
- Speed: 36 knots (67 km/h; 41 mph)
- Range: 3,000 nmi (5,600 km; 3,500 mi) at 14 knots (26 km/h; 16 mph)
- Crew: 12 officers, 224 crewmen (wartime)
- Armament: 5 × single 138.6 mm (5.5 in) guns; 4 × single 37 mm (1.5 in) anti-aircraft guns; 2 × twin 13.2 mm (0.52 in) anti-aircraft machineguns; 1 × triple, 2 × twin 550 mm (21.7 in) torpedo tubes; 2 chutes and 2 throwers for 36 depth charges; 40 mines

Chevalier Paul was one of six Vauquelin-class large destroyers (contre-torpilleurs) built for the French Navy (Marine Nationale) during the 1930s. The ship entered service in 1934 and spent most of her career in the Mediterranean. During the Spanish Civil War of 1936–1939, she was one of the ships that helped to enforce the non-intervention agreement. When France declared war on Germany in September 1939, all of the Vauquelins were assigned to the High Sea Forces (Forces de haute mer (FHM)) which was tasked to escort French convoys and support the other commands as needed. Chevalier Paul was briefly deployed to Scotland in early 1940 to support the Allied forces in the Norwegian Campaign, but returned to the Mediterranean in time to participate in Operation Vado, a bombardment of Italian coastal facilities after Italy entered the war in June.

The ship was assigned to the Vichy French FHM when it was reformed after the Armistice of 22 June 1940. She attempted to ferry ammunition to French Lebanon after it was invaded by the Allied forces in June 1941, but was sunk off the coast of French Syria by British aircraft with almost all of her crew surviving.

== Design and description ==
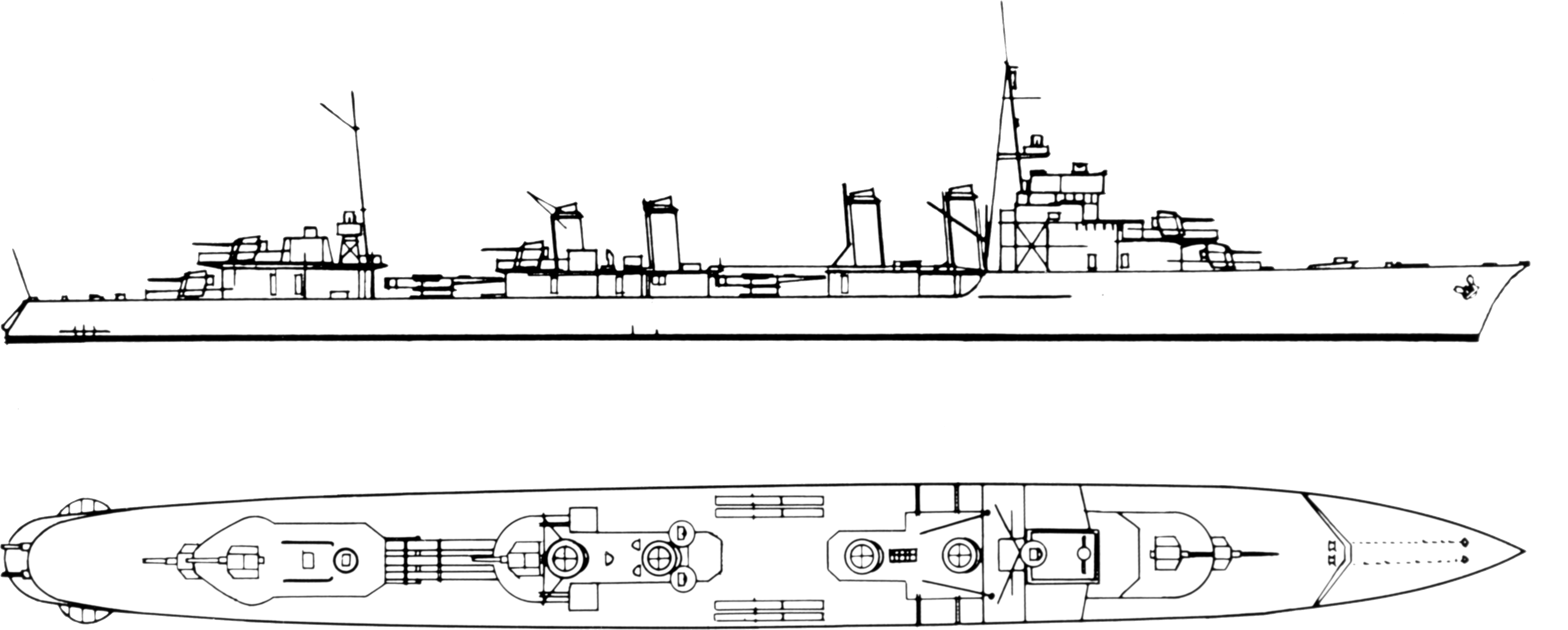
Right elevation and plan of the Vauquelin class

The Vauquelin-class ships were designed as improved versions of the preceding Aigle-class destroyers. They had an overall length of 129.3 meters (424 ft 3 in), a beam of 11.8 meters (38 ft 9 in), and a draft of 4.97 meters (16 ft 4 in). The ships displaced 2,441 metric tons (2,402 long tons) at standard and 3,120 metric tons (3,070 long tons) at deep load. They were powered by two geared steam turbines, each driving one propeller shaft, using steam provided by four du Temple boilers. The turbines were designed to produce 64,000 metric horsepower (47,000 kW; 63,000 shp), which would propel the ships at 36 knots (67 km/h; 41 mph). During her sea trials on 3 March 1934, Chevalier Paul's Parsons turbines provided 70,575 PS (51,908 kW; 69,610 shp) and she reached 39.1 knots (72.4 km/h; 45.0 mph) for a single hour. The ships carried enough fuel oil to give them a range of 3,000 nautical miles (5,600 km; 3,500 mi) at 14 knots (26 km/h; 16 mph). Their crew consisted of 10 officers and 201 crewmen in peacetime and 12 officers and 220 enlisted men in wartime.

The main armament of the Vauquelin-class ships consisted of five 138.6-millimeter (5.5 in) Modèle 1927 guns in single shielded mounts, one superfiring pair fore and aft of the superstructure and the fifth gun abaft the aft funnel. Their anti-aircraft armament consisted of four 37-millimeter (1.5 in) Modèle 1927 guns in single mounts positioned amidships and two twin mounts for 13.2-millimeter (0.52 in) Hotchkiss Modèle 1929 anti-aircraft machine guns on the forecastle deck abreast the bridge. The ships carried two above-water twin mounts for 550-millimeter (21.7 in) torpedo tubes, one pair on each broadside between the pairs of funnels as well as one triple mount aft of the rear pair of funnels. A pair of depth charge chutes were built into their stern; these housed a total of sixteen 200-kilogram (440 lb) depth charges, with eight more in reserve. They were also fitted with a pair of depth-charge throwers, one on each broadside abreast the aft funnels, for which they carried a dozen 100-kilogram (220 lb) depth charges. The ships could be fitted with rails to drop 40 Breguet B4 530-kilogram (1,170 lb) mines.

=== Modifications ===
The depth-charge throwers were removed in 1936 and more 200-kilogram depth charges were carried in their place. The Navy reconsidered its anti-submarine warfare tactics after the war began in September and intended to reinstate the depth-charge throwers, although these were an older model than the one previously installed; Chevalier Paul had not received hers before her loss. As an interim measure, a pair of rails were installed on the stern for 35-kilogram (77 lb) depth charges. Each rail could accommodate three depth charges and ten more were stored in the magazine. During the ship's late 1940–early 1941 anti-aircraft refit, the mainmast was replaced by a platform for a single 37-millimeter twin-gun mount and two of her single 37-millimeter mounts were transferred to the platform while the other two single mounts were removed. The Hotchkiss machine guns were repositioned in front of the bridge and a pair of Browning 13.2-millimeter AA machine guns were installed on new platforms between the funnels. Her aft torpedo mount was removed to compensate for the additional weight. Chevalier Paul was scheduled to receive a British Alpha 128 ASDIC system, but was sunk before it could be installed.

== Construction and career ==
Chevalier Paul, named after Chevalier Paul, was ordered on 1 February 1930 from Forges et Chantiers de la Méditerranée as part of the 1929 Naval Program, at a cost of 56 millions of Francs. She was laid down at their La Seyne-sur-Mer shipyard on 28 February 1931, launched on 21 March 1932, commissioned on 1 June 1934 and entered service on 24 August 1934. Her entry into service was delayed when one of her gearboxes was transferred to the destroyer Aigle.

When the Vauquelins entered service they were assigned to the 5th and the newly formed 6th Light Divisions (Division légère (DL)) which were later redesignated as scout divisions (Division de contre-torpilleurs). Chevalier Paul and her sister ships Tartu and Cassard were assigned to the 5th DL of the group of large destroyers (Groupe de contre-torpilleurs (GCT) of the 3rd Squadron (3^{e} Escadre), based in Toulon. On 27 June 1935, all of the Vauquelins, except Cassard, participated in a naval review conducted by the Navy Minister (Ministre de la Marine) François Piétri in the Baie de Douarnenez after combined maneuvers by the 1st and 2nd Squadrons.

After the start of the Spanish Civil War in July 1936, the contre-torpilleurs and destroyers in the Mediterranean were assigned to assist French citizens in Spain and to patrol the surveillance zones assigned to France on a monthly rotation beginning on 24 September as part of the non-intervention agreement. The GCT reverted to its previous designation of the 3rd Light Squadron on 15 September. As of 1 October 1936 Chevalier Paul, Tartu and Vauquelin were assigned to the 5th Light Division while Kersaint, Maillé Brézé and Cassard belonged to the 9th, both of which were assigned to the Mediterranean Squadron. In May–June 1938 the Mediterranean Squadron cruised the Eastern Mediterranean; the squadron was redesignated at the Mediterranean Fleet (Flotte de la Méditerranée) on 1 July 1939.

On 27 August 1939, in anticipation of war with Nazi Germany, the French Navy planned to reorganize the Mediterranean Fleet into the FHM of three squadrons. When France declared war on 3 September, the reorganization was ordered and the 3rd Light Squadron, which included the 5th and 9th Scout Divisions with all of the Vauquelin-class ships, was assigned to the 3rd Squadron which was transferred to Oran, French Algeria, on 3 September. On 5 April 1940, the 5th Scout Division with Chevalier Paul, Tartu and Maillé Brézé was assigned to Force Z in anticipation of an Allied invasion of Norway; their mission was to escort convoys between Scotland and Norway. The German invasion on 9 April preempted the Allies and Chevalier Paul did not begin her escort duties until mid-April when she covered Convoy FP-1 transporting the 5th Demi-Brigade of Mountain Infantry (5^{e} Demi-Brigade de Chasseurs alpins) to participate in the Namsos Campaign on 19 April. On 24–27 April, the ship escorted Convoy FP-2 conveying the 27th Demi-Brigade of Mountain Infantry to Harstad, Norway, to join the Battle of Narvik. On 3–4 May she joined Tartu, the destroyer Milan and the British destroyers HMS Sikh and HMS Tartar in an unsuccessful attempt to intercept a German convoy. The 5th Scout Division returned to Toulon on 27 May in anticipation of the Italians joining the war as the Mediterranean Fleet was prepared to attack them. After they declared war on 10 June, the fleet planned to bombard installations on the Italian coast. Chevalier Paul and the rest of the 5th Scout Division were among the ships ordered to attack targets in Vado Ligure on 14 June. The destroyer was tasked to bombard the Petrolea oil tanks. Two Italian MAS boats on patrol attempted to attack the French ships, but only one was able to launch a torpedo before they were driven off with light damage by the French defensive fire. Damage assessments afterward revealed that little damage had been inflicted despite expending over 1,600 rounds of all calibers.

The Vichy French government reestablished the FHM on 25 September after it negotiated rules limiting the force's activities and numbers with the Italian and German Armistice Commissions. Chevalier Paul, Tartu and Vauquelin were assigned to the FHM on 15 November. After the Allies invaded Lebanon and Syria on 8 June 1941, Admiral François Darlan, Minister of War and National Defense in the Vichy government, ordered Chevalier Paul to carry ammunition for the French ships in Beirut, French Lebanon, departing on 11 June. He had requested permission from the Germans and Italians to do so via radio message which the British decoded and alerted them to the ship's mission and route. She passed the Greek island of Kastellorizo on 15 June and hugged the coast of Turkey to try to avoid detection or interception by British forces on Cyprus, but a British reconnaissance aircraft found her at 18:15 on 15 June. Six Fleet Air Arm Fairey Swordfish torpedo bombers of 815 Naval Air Squadron attacked her 50 nmi (93 km; 58 mi) off the Syrian coast at 03:00 the next morning and torpedoed her at the cost of one Swordfish shot down.

Chevalier Paul radioed for help, and the Vichy French destroyers Valmy and Guépard departed Beirut an hour later to come to her aid, but were almost immediately intercepted by the New Zealand light cruiser Leander and the destroyers HMS Jervis and HMS Kimberley and forced to retire to Beirut. After French aircraft drove off the Allied ships, Valmy and Guépard again set out to assist Chevalier Paul, but they were too late, the ship sank at 06:45 off the coast of Syria. Valmy and Guépard rescued all of her crew, except seven missing men, and the crew of the downed Swordfish.
