= French destroyer Maillé Brézé (1931) =

French Navy's Vauquelin-class destroyer

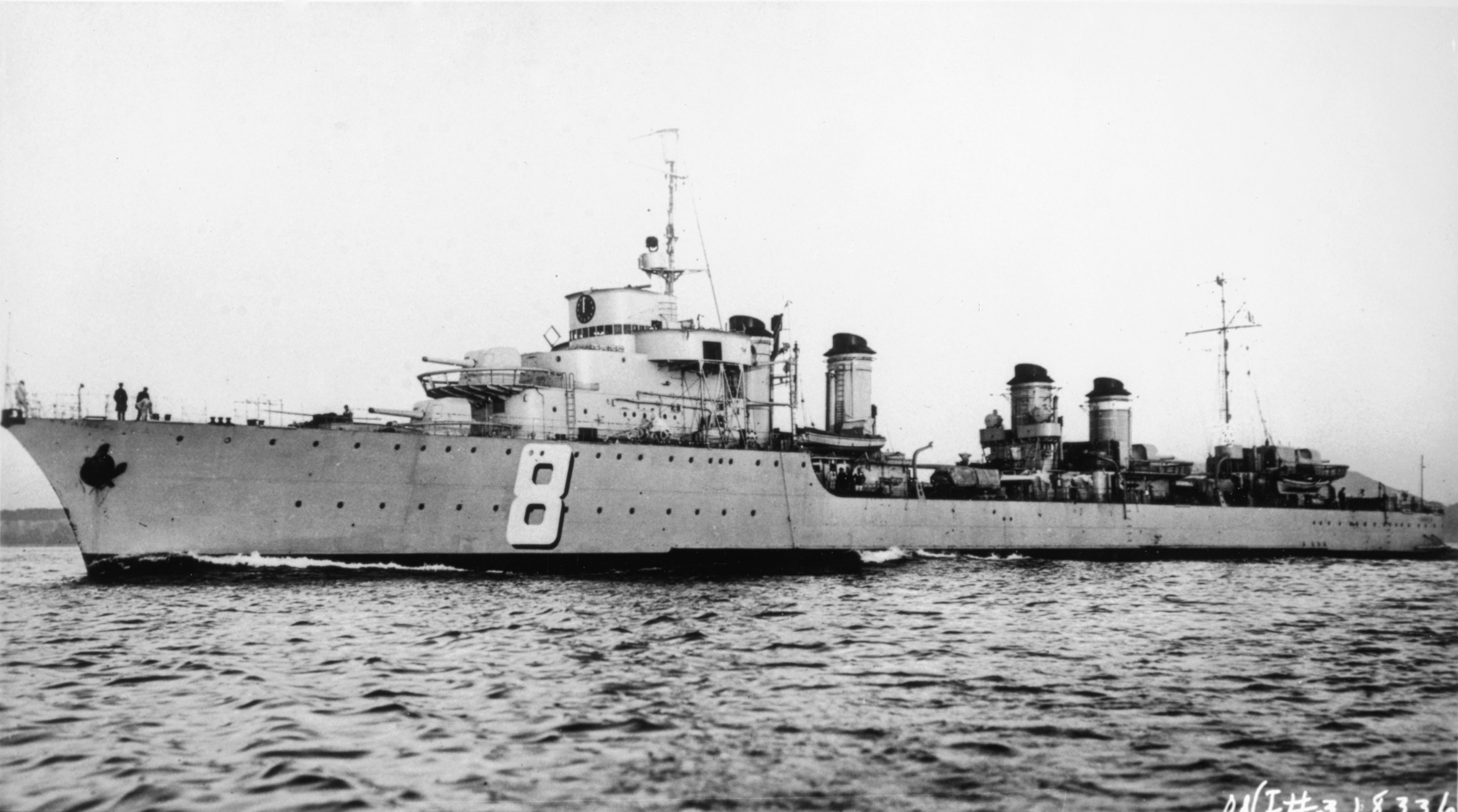
- Sister ship Vauquelin, about 1934

History

France
- Name: Maillé Brézé
- Namesake: Jean Armand de Maillé-Brézé, Duc de Fronsac
- Ordered: 1 February 1930
- Builder: Ateliers et Chantiers de Saint-Nazaire Penhoët, Saint-Nazaire
- Laid down: 9 October 1930
- Launched: 9 November 1931
- Completed: 6 April 1933
- Commissioned: 31 December 1932
- In service: 23 April 1933
- Fate: Lost by accidental explosion, 30 April 1940

General characteristics
- Class & type: Vauquelin-class destroyer
- Displacement: 2,441 t (2,402 long tons) (standard); 3,120 t (3,070 long tons) (deep load)
- Length: 129.3 m (424 ft 3 in)
- Beam: 11.8 m (38 ft 9 in)
- Draft: 4.97 m (16 ft 4 in)
- Installed power: 4 du Temple boilers; 64,000 PS (47,000 kW; 63,000 shp)
- Propulsion: 2 shafts; 2 geared steam turbines
- Speed: 36 knots (67 km/h; 41 mph)
- Range: 3,000 nmi (5,600 km; 3,500 mi) at 14 knots (26 km/h; 16 mph)
- Crew: 12 officers, 220 crewmen (wartime)
- Armament: 5 × single 138.6 mm (5.5 in) guns; 4 × single 37 mm (1.5 in) anti-aircraft guns; 2 × twin 13.2 mm (0.52 in) anti-aircraft machineguns; 1 × triple, 2 × twin 550 mm (21.7 in) torpedo tubes; 2 chutes and 2 throwers for 36 depth charges; 40 mines

Maillé Brézé was one of six Vauquelin-class destroyers (contre-torpilleurs) built for the French Navy (Marine Nationale) during the 1930s. The ship entered service in 1933 and spent most of her career in the Mediterranean, sometimes as a flagship. During the Spanish Civil War of 1936–1939, she was one of the ships that helped to enforce the non-intervention agreement. When France declared war on Germany in September 1939, all of the Vauquelins were assigned to the High Sea Forces (Forces de haute mer (FHM)) which was tasked to escort French convoys and support the other commands as needed. Maillé Brézé accordingly spent most of the next six months on escort duties. She played a minor role in the Norwegian Campaign before she was lost in an accidental explosion in April 1940. Most of her crew survived the incident; her wreck was not salvaged until 1954 and was subsequently scrapped.

== Design and description ==
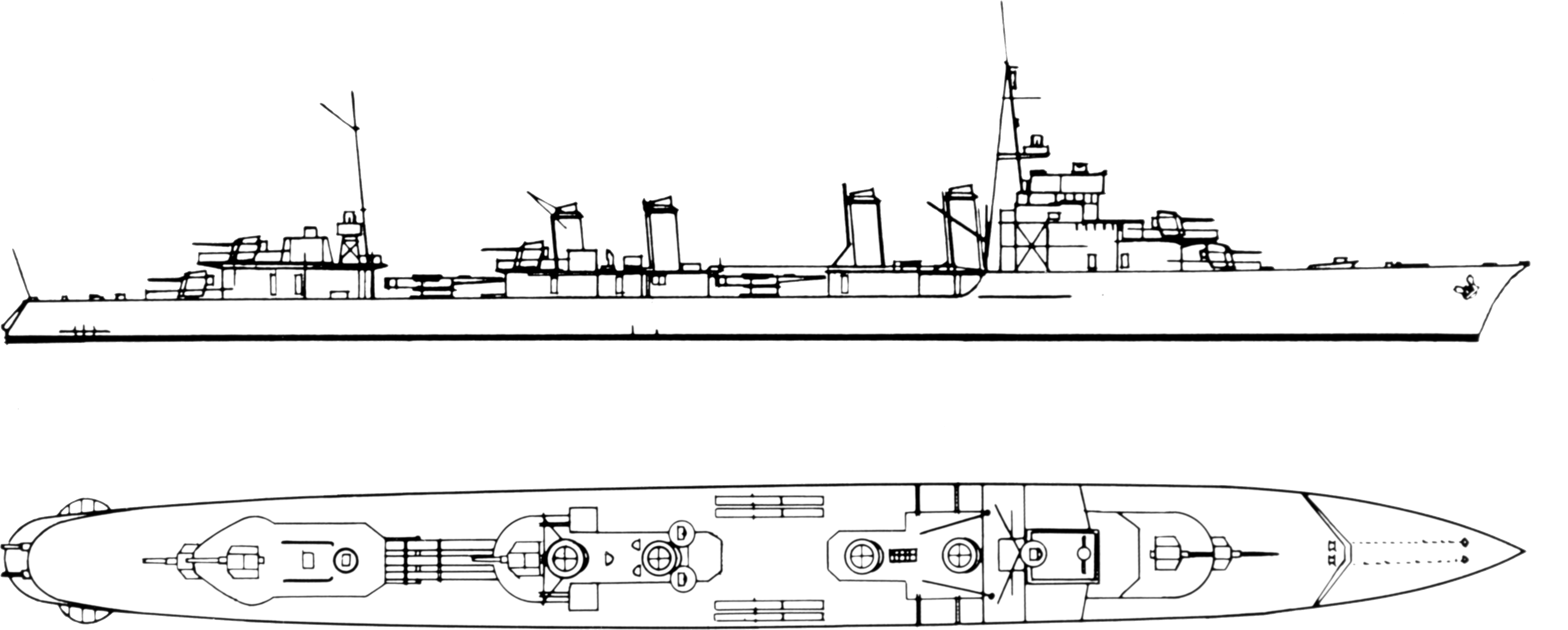
Right elevation and plan of the Vauquelin class

The Vauquelin-class ships were designed as improved versions of the preceding Aigle-class destroyers. They had an overall length of 129.3 meters (424 ft 3 in), a beam of 11.8 meters (38 ft 9 in), and a draft of 4.97 meters (16 ft 4 in). The ships displaced 2,441 metric tons (2,402 long tons) at standard and 3,120 metric tons (3,070 long tons) at deep load. They were powered by two geared Parsons steam turbines, each driving one propeller shaft, using steam provided by four du Temple boilers. The turbines were designed to produce 64,000 metric horsepower (47,000 kW; 63,000 shp), which would propel the ships at 36 knots (67 km/h; 41 mph). During her sea trials on 5 October 1932, Maillé Brézé's turbines provided 69,362 PS (51,016 kW; 68,413 shp) and she reached 40.3 knots (74.6 km/h; 46.4 mph) for a single hour. The ships carried enough fuel oil to give them a range of 3,000 nautical miles (5,600 km; 3,500 mi) at 14 knots (26 km/h; 16 mph). Their crew consisted of 10 officers and 201 crewmen in peacetime and 12 officers and 220 enlisted men in wartime.

The main armament of the Vauquelin-class ships consisted of five 138.6-millimeter (5.5 in) Modèle 1927 guns in single shielded mounts, one superfiring pair fore and aft of the superstructure and the fifth gun abaft the aft funnel. Their anti-aircraft (AA) armament consisted of four 37-millimeter (1.5 in) Modèle 1927 AA guns in single mounts positioned amidships and two twin mounts for Hotchkiss 13.2-millimeter (0.52 in) Modèle 1929 AA machine guns on the forecastle deck abreast the bridge. The ships carried two above-water twin mounts for 550-millimeter (21.7 in) torpedo tubes, one pair on each broadside between each pair of funnels as well as one triple mount aft of the rear pair of funnels able to traverse to both sides. A pair of depth charge chutes were built into their stern; these housed a total of sixteen 200-kilogram (440 lb) depth charges, with eight more in reserve. They were also fitted with a pair of depth-charge throwers, one on each broadside abreast the aft funnels, for which they carried a dozen 100-kilogram (220 lb) depth charges. The ships could be fitted with rails to drop forty 530-kilogram (1,170 lb) Breguet B4 mines. The depth-charge throwers were removed in 1936 and more 200-kilogram depth charges were carried in their place.

== Construction and career ==
Maillé Brézé, named after Jean Armand de Maillé-Brézé, was ordered on 1 February 1930 from Ateliers et Chantiers de Saint-Nazaire Penhoët as part of the 1929 Naval Program. She was laid down at their Saint-Nazaire shipyard on 9 October 1930, launched on 9 November 1931, commissioned on 31 December 1932 and entered service on 6 April 1933. Her entry into service was delayed for several months by a problems with one of her turbines and she wrapped a chain around her propeller during her sea trials.

When the Vauquelins entered service they were assigned to the 5th and the newly formed 6th Light Divisions (Division légère (DL)) which were later redesignated as scout divisions (Division de contre-torpilleurs). Maillé Brézé and her sister ships Vauquelin and Kersaint were assigned to the 6th DL of the 2nd Light Squadron (2^{e} Escadre légère of the 2nd Squadron (2^{e} Escadre), based in Brest. The 6th DL was transferred to the group of large destroyers (Groupe de contre-torpilleurs (GCT) of the 1st Squadron (1^{e} Escadre) in Toulon in October 1934 and it was renumbered as the 9th. On 27 June 1935, all of the Vauquelins, except Cassard, participated in a naval review conducted by the Navy Minister (Ministre de la Marine) François Piétri in the Baie de Douarnenez after combined maneuvers by the 1st and 2nd Squadrons.

After the start of the Spanish Civil War in July 1936, Maillé Brézé was among the ships assigned to evacuate French citizens from Spain on 22 July; she was then transferred to the Tangier International Zone in Morocco to patrol the surveillance zones assigned to France. After 24 September most of the contre-torpilleurs and destroyers in the Mediterranean were assigned these tasks on a monthly rotation as part of the non-intervention policy. On 18 January 1937 the ship was unsuccessfully attacked by a Spanish Republican Air Force bomber off the coast of Catalonia.

As of 1 October 1936 Maillé Brézé, Kersaint and Cassard were assigned to the 9th DL while Vauquelin, Tartu and Chevalier Paul belonged to the 5th, both of which were assigned to the Mediterranean Squadron as the 1st Squadron was now known. The 9th DL participated in a naval review held by the Navy Minister Alphonse Gasnier-Duparc in Brest on 27 May 1937. The following year the Mediterranean Squadron cruised the Eastern Mediterranean in May–June 1938. Maillé Brézé became flagship of the 3rd Light Squadron, as the GCT had been redesignated, on 12 October. The Mediterranean Squadron was redesignated at the Mediterranean Fleet (Flotte de la Méditerranée) on 1 July 1939.

=== World War II ===
On 27 August, in anticipation of war with Nazi Germany, the French Navy planned to reorganize the Mediterranean Squadron into the FHM of three squadrons. When France declared war on 3 September, the reorganization was ordered and the 3rd Light Squadron, which included the 5th and 9th Scout Divisions with all of the Vauquelin-class ships, was assigned to the 3rd Squadron which was transferred to Oran, French Algeria, on 3 September. The 9th Scout Division with Maillé Brézé, Kersaint and Cassard was assigned to escort duties until April 1940. In mid-October 1939 Maillé Brézé and Vauquelin escorted the heavy cruisers Algérie and Dupleix to Dakar, French West Africa, and then escorted a convoy back home. On 22 December Maillé Brézé, Kersaint and the large destroyers Albatros, Vauban and Bison rendezvoused with Force Z, the battleship Lorraine and the light cruisers Jean de Vienne and Marseillaise, which was escorting four cargo ships loaded with American aircraft to Casablanca, French Morocco. Together with the large destroyers Vautour and Albatros, Maillé Brézé rendezvoused with the heavy cruisers Foch and Dupleix on 13 February 1940 as they escorted three more freighters loaded with American aircraft to Casablanca. The following month, Maillé Brézé was briefly one of the escorts for Algérie and the battleship French battleship Bretagne as they ferried 2,379 bars of gold to Halifax, Canada.

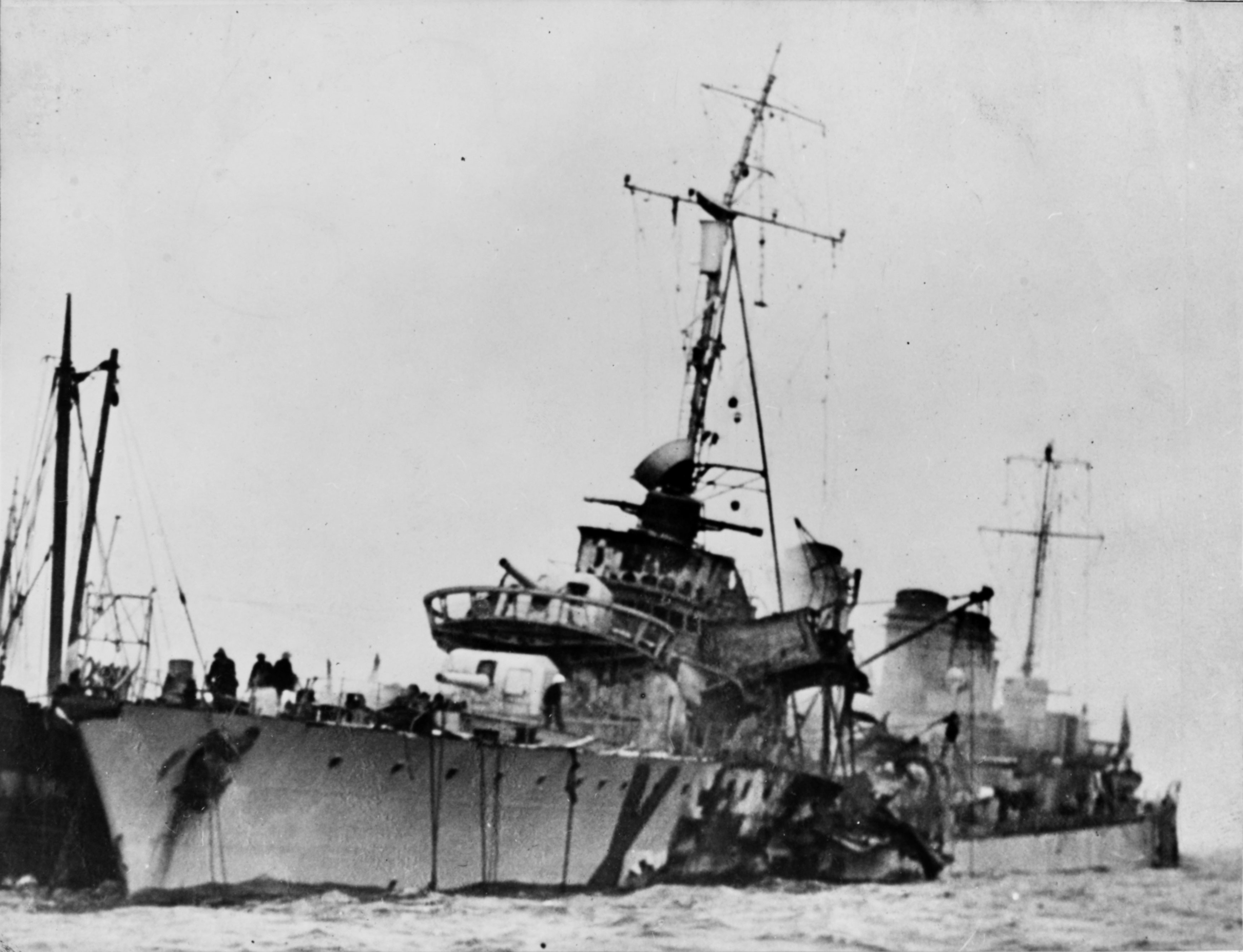
Maillé Brézé on fire and sinking, 30 April 1940

On 5 April the 5th Scout Division with Maillé Brézé, Tartu and Chevalier Paul was assigned to Force Z in anticipation of an Allied invasion of Norway; their mission was to escort convoys between Scotland and Norway. The German invasion on 9 April preempted the Allies and Tartu did not begin her escort duties until mid-April when she covered Convoy FP-1 transporting the 5th Demi-Brigade of Mountain Infantry (5^{e} Demi-Brigade de Chasseurs alpins) to participate in the Namsos Campaign on 19 April; the German submarine U-46 unsuccessfully attacked Maillé Brézé with one torpedo and was unsuccessfully depth charged by her.

On 30 April 1940, at 14:15, as Maillé Brézé was anchored at the Tail of the Bank, Firth of Clyde off Greenock, Scotland, a torpedo tube malfunctioned while undergoing maintenance and launched an armed torpedo onto the deck which struck the aft end of the forecastle. The detonation set fire to the fuel tanks and the forward magazine, which however did not explode. At 15:15, the crew abandoned ship due to the danger of explosion, except for numerous sailors trapped in the mess hall. Around 16:30, a few sailors returned to the ship to flood the aft magazine, and by 19:30 the fire was controlled by the Greenock firemen. By that time, Maillé Brézé was so low in the water that she began sinking before she could be towed, and she went down with those still trapped in the forward part. The accident killed 37 and wounded 47 crewmen. Although the ship was well off the main shipping channel when she sank, by 1953 the Ministry of Transport was concerned about unstable ammunition and leakage of her remaining fuel oil and requested that the Admiralty assess the feasibility of raising the wreck. After cutting away most of her superstructure to reduce the weight of the silt-filled ship, her hull was first lifted on the night of 3/4 August 1954. After grounding her on a nearby beach where 40 long tons (41 t) of ammunition and 500 long tons (508 t) of fuel oil were removed, the ship was refloated and towed to Port Glasgow on 15 September where she was broken up.

== Memories and memorials ==
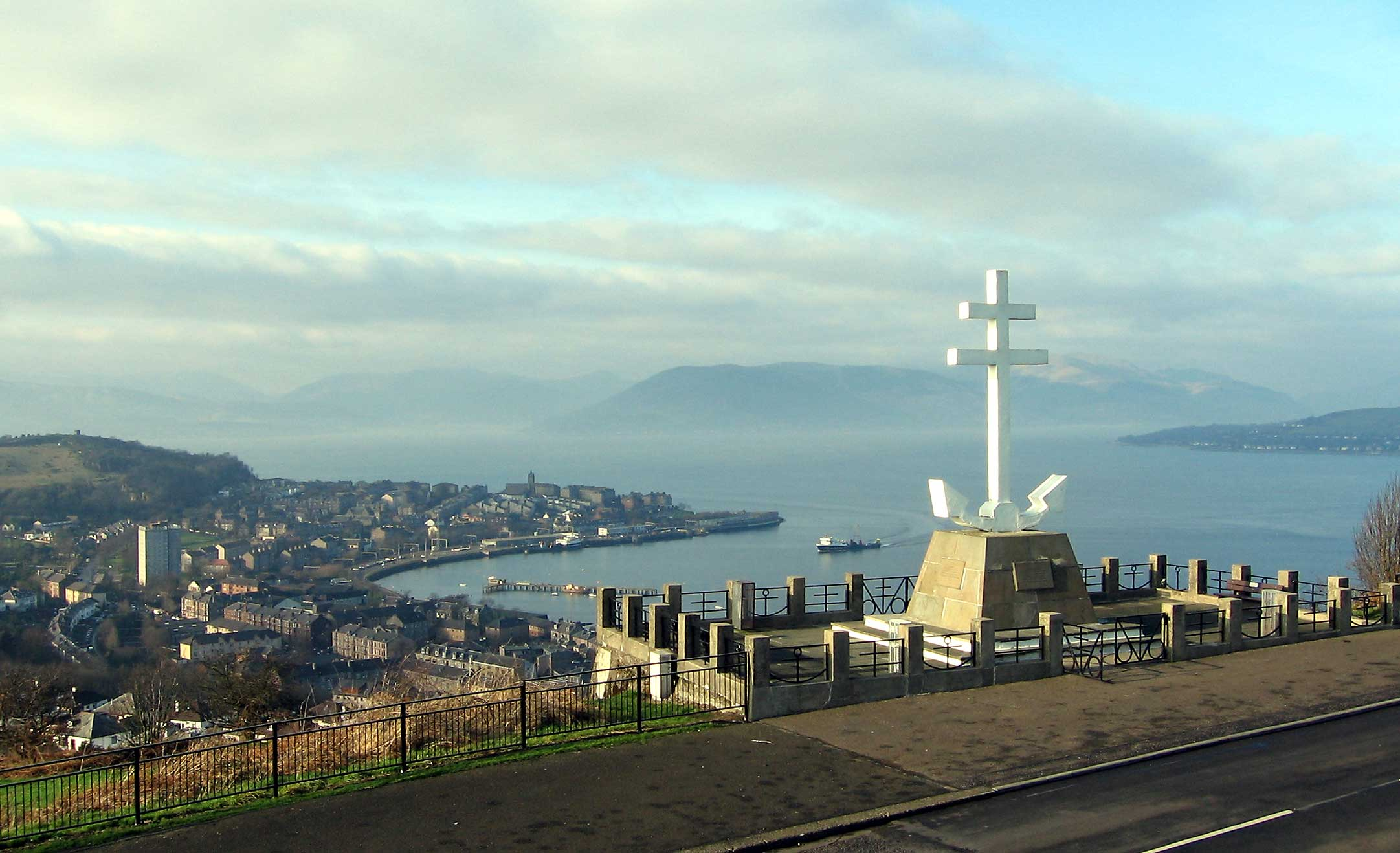
The sinking is unofficially remembered in the Inverclyde area in relation to the Free French Memorial

Greenockian May Watson recalled in an interview sixty years after the event that she clearly remembered being in an art class at school at the time, and "we just heard this tremendous bang and we all wondered what it was. It was a bang that we had never heard before, really dreadful. We were excited and afraid at the same time wondering what this big bang was". When she went home, she was told that "Some of the sailors were killed and others managed to swim to safety but even those sailors were badly injured in the blast. The sailors were brought ashore and were taken to halls in Greenock. A lot of the ladies in the town went along to the halls and helped to bathe their wounds until they could be taken to hospital — the old Greenock Royal Infirmary in Duncan Street."

She said that the "dead were buried in Greenock cemetery until 1946 when the bodies were returned to France. There was a service for those who had died in St. Mary’s church." Her recollection was that the Free French Memorial, Greenock, was erected on Lyle Hill in memory of the dead of the Maillé Brézé. This remains a common belief in the Inverclyde area, but is incorrect as the sinking occurred a few months before the Free French Naval Forces came into being, and there is no mention of the ship or its sailors on the monument. There is a more modest memorial to the lost crew of the Maillé Brézé at Brookwood Cemetery, Surrey, England.
