= Cap de la Chèvre =

Headland in France

Coordinates: 48°10′20″N 4°32′50″W

Map of the Mer d'Iroise

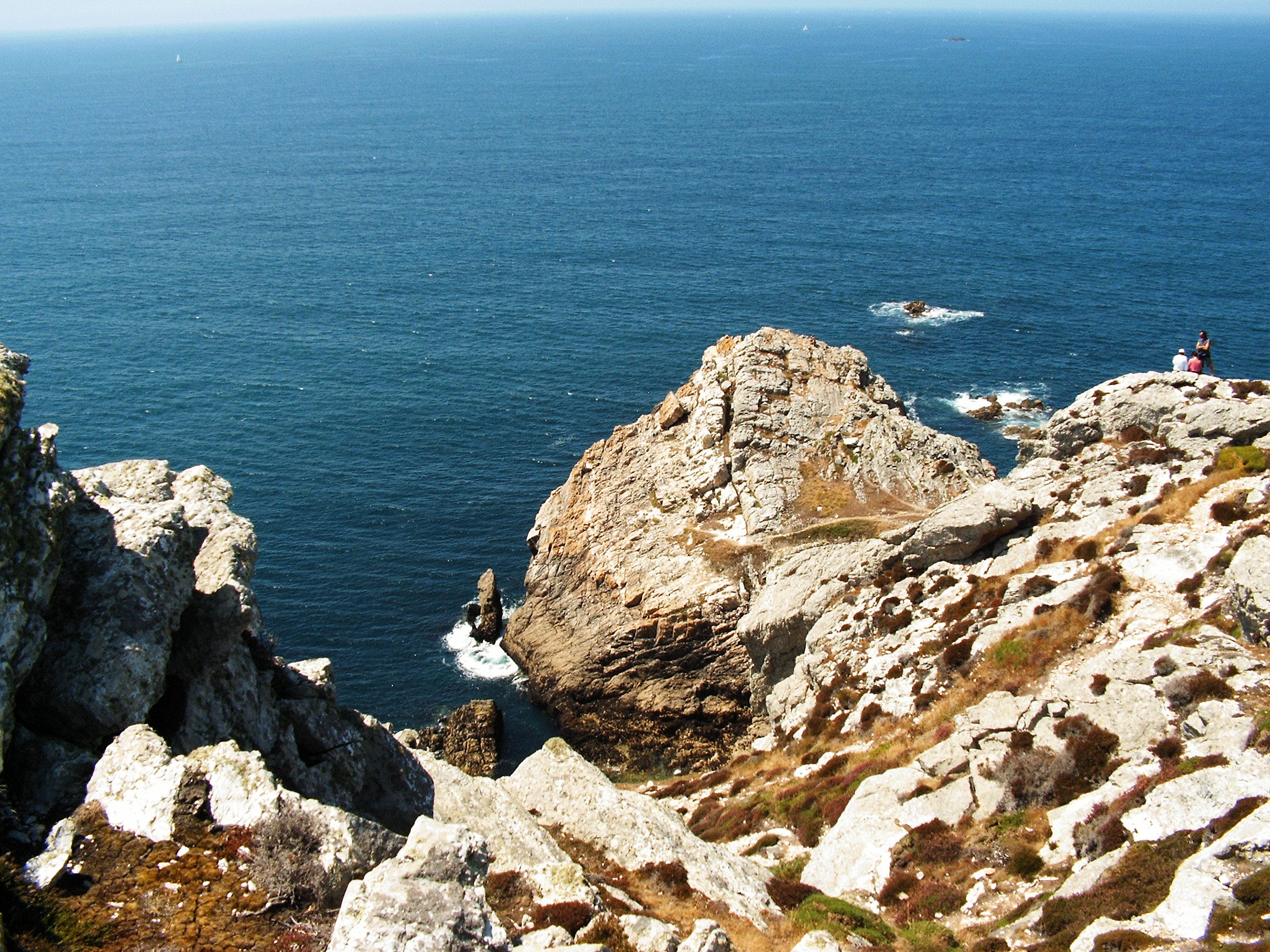
Cap de la Chèvre

The cap de la Chèvre (Breton: Kab ar C'havr) is the southernmost point of the Crozon peninsula in western Brittany in France. Facing south, it faces the north side of cap Sizun and closes off the baie de Douarnenez.

Consisting of heath, heather and maritime pines, this headland maintains a savage appearance and magnificent countryside, along with several little villages with stone-built houses typical of the region. At the end of the headland, in good weather, one can see cap Sizun, île de sein, the baie de Douarnenez, pointe de Pen-Hir, pointe Saint-Mathieu and the islands of Ushant and Molène.

Sheep will soon be reintroduced into the cap de la Chèvre, to maintain the moors of the Conservatoire du littoral.
