= Vauquelin-class destroyer =

French destroyer class

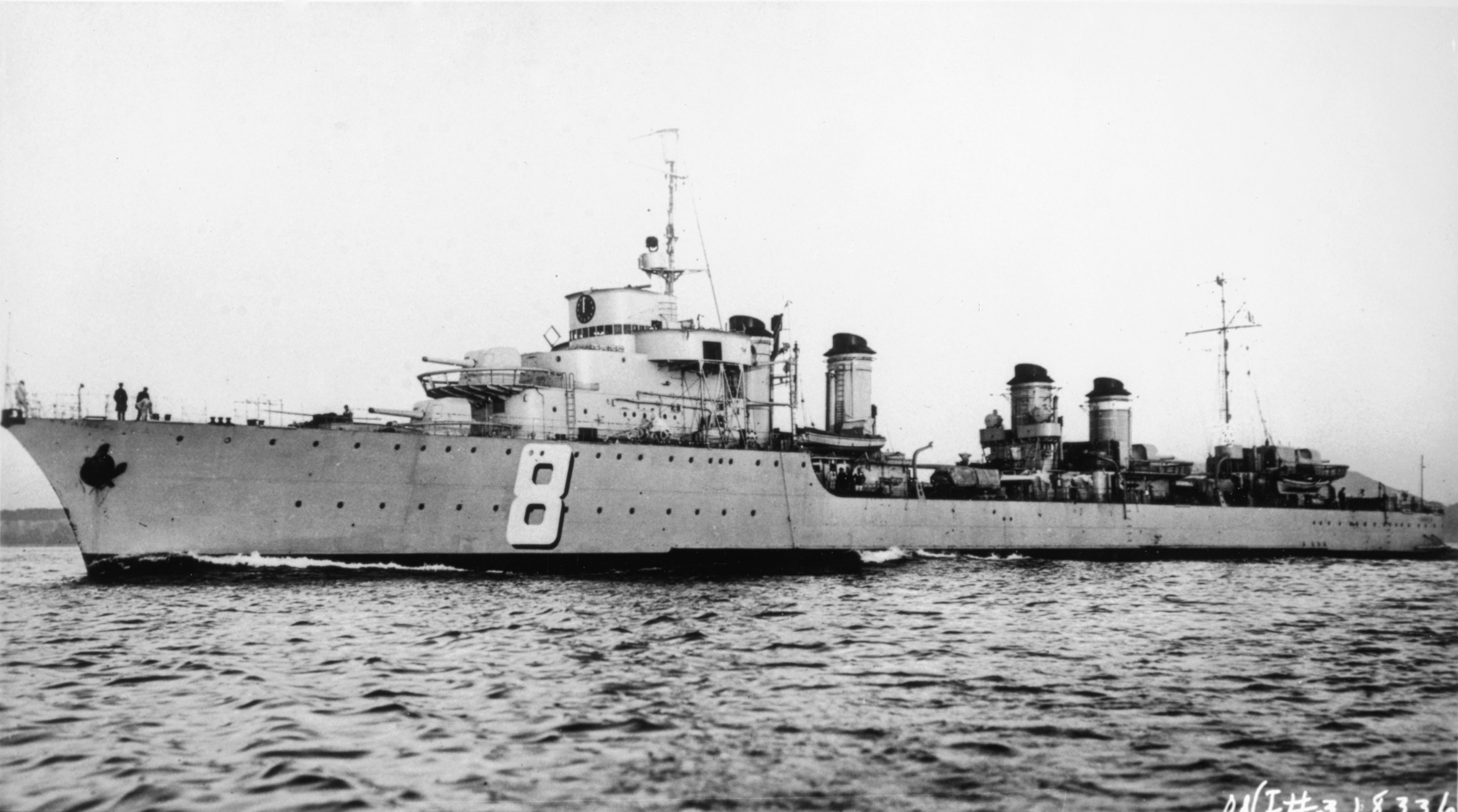
- Vauquelin, about 1934

Class overview
- Name: Vauquelin class
- Operators: French Navy
- Preceded by: Aigle class
- Succeeded by: Le Fantasque class
- Built: 1930–1934
- In service: 1933–1942
- Completed: 6
- Lost: 6

General characteristics
- Type: Large destroyer
- Displacement: 2,441 t (2,402 long tons) (standard); 3,120 t (3,070 long tons) (deep load)
- Length: 129.3 m (424 ft 3 in)
- Beam: 11.8 m (38 ft 9 in)
- Draft: 4.97 m (16 ft 4 in)
- Installed power: 4 du Temple boilers; 64,000 PS (47,000 kW; 63,000 shp)
- Propulsion: 2 shafts; 2 geared steam turbines
- Speed: 36 knots (67 km/h; 41 mph)
- Range: 3,000 nmi (5,600 km; 3,500 mi) at 14 knots (26 km/h; 16 mph)
- Crew: 12 officers, 224 crewmen (wartime)
- Armament: 5 × single 138.6 mm (5.5 in) guns; 4 × single 37 mm (1.5 in) AA guns; 2 × twin 13.2 mm (0.52 in) AA machine guns; 1 × triple, 2 × twin 550 mm (21.7 in) torpedo tubes; 2 chutes and 2 throwers for 36 depth charges; 40 mines

The Vauquelin class was a group of six large destroyers (contre-torpilleurs) built for the French Navy (Marine Nationale) in the early 1930s. Entering service in 1933–1934, the sister ships spent most of their careers in the Mediterranean. During the Spanish Civil War of 1936–1939, they helped to enforce the non-intervention agreement. When France declared war on Germany in September 1939, all of the Vauquelins were assigned to the High Sea Forces (Forces de haute mer (FHM)) which was tasked to escort French convoys and support the other commands as needed. Three of the sisters briefly deployed to Scotland in early 1940 to support the Allied forces in the Norwegian Campaign and Maillé Brézé was lost to an accidental explosion. The others returned to the Mediterranean in time to participate in Operation Vado, a bombardment of Italian coastal facilities after Italy entered the war in June.

The Vichy French reformed the FHM after the French surrender in late June. After the Allies invaded French Lebanon and Syria in June 1941, Chevalier Paul was ordered to ferry ammunition there. Sunk en route, the ship was replaced by her sister Vauquelin which successfully delivered the ammunition and then attempted to transport reinforcements and supplies to Lebanon. The four surviving ships were scuttled in Toulon when the Germans occupied Vichy France in November 1942. They were not successfully salvaged during the war and their wrecks were broken up well after the war.

== Design and description ==
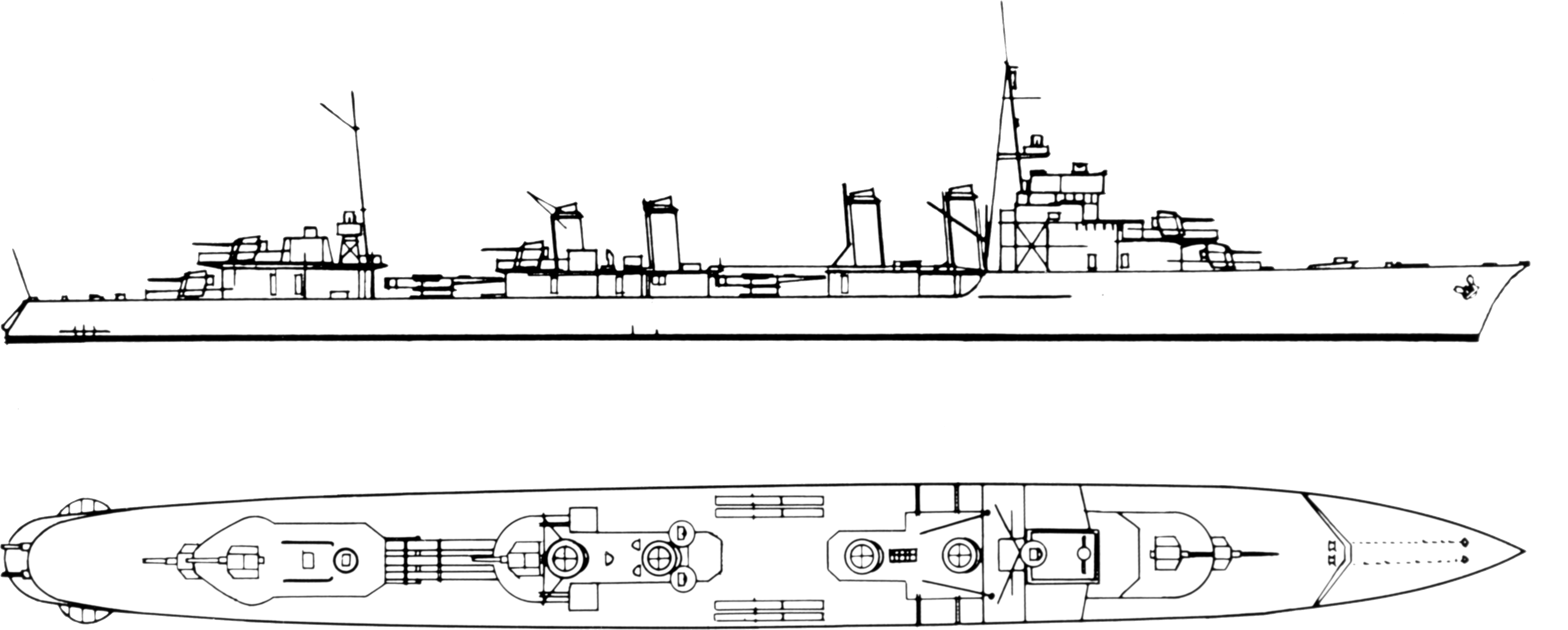
Right elevation and plan of the Vauquelin class

Like their predecessors, the contre-torpilleurs of the Vauquelin class were designed as fleet scouts, intended to fight their way through the enemy's screen. The design was virtually identical to the preceding Aigle-class destroyers, although the stern was reshaped to improve minelaying and the torpedo armament was revised. To reduce topweight, the use of electric welding for non-strength parts of the hull and superstructure was increased as was the use of duralumin for internal partitions and parts of the superstructure. This improved their metacentric height at deep load to 0.7 m (2.3 ft) and made them much more stable than the Aigles. The Vauquelins were considered to be good seaboats, although the small rudder, carried over from the earlier ships, made them not very maneuverable. In service the use of duralumin was much criticized as it was corrosion prone and required much maintenance.

The Vauquelin-class ships had an overall length of 129.3 meters (424 ft 3 in), a beam of 11.8 meters (38 ft 9 in), and a draft of 4.97 meters (16 ft 4 in). The ships displaced 2,441 metric tons (2,402 long tons) at standard and 3,120 metric tons (3,070 long tons) at deep load. Their hull was subdivided by a dozen traverse bulkheads into 13 watertight compartments. Their crew consisted of 10 officers and 201 crewmen in peacetime and 12 officers and 220 enlisted men in wartime.

The Vauquelins were powered by two geared Rateau-Breguet or Parsons steam turbines, each driving one propeller shaft using steam provided by four du Temple boilers that operated at a pressure of 20 kg/cm^{2} (1,961 kPa; 284 psi) and a temperature of 215 °C (419 °F). The turbines were designed to produce 64,000 metric horsepower (47,000 kW; 63,000 shp) which was intended give the ships a speed of 36 knots (67 km/h; 41 mph). During their sea trials, each of the ships comfortably exceeded their designed speed, ranging from 38.4 to 41 knots (71.1 to 75.9 km/h; 44.2 to 47.2 mph) from 69,326 to 79,846 PS (50,989 to 58,727 kW; 68,378 to 78,754 shp). They carried a maximum of 585 metric tons (576 long tons) of fuel oil which give them a range of 3,000 nautical miles (5,600 km; 3,500 mi) at 14 knots (26 km/h; 16 mph). The ships were fitted with two 80-kilowatt (110 hp) turbo generators in the engine rooms. In addition, a pair of 22-kilowatt (30 hp) diesel generators were located in the central superstructure.

=== Armament and fire control ===
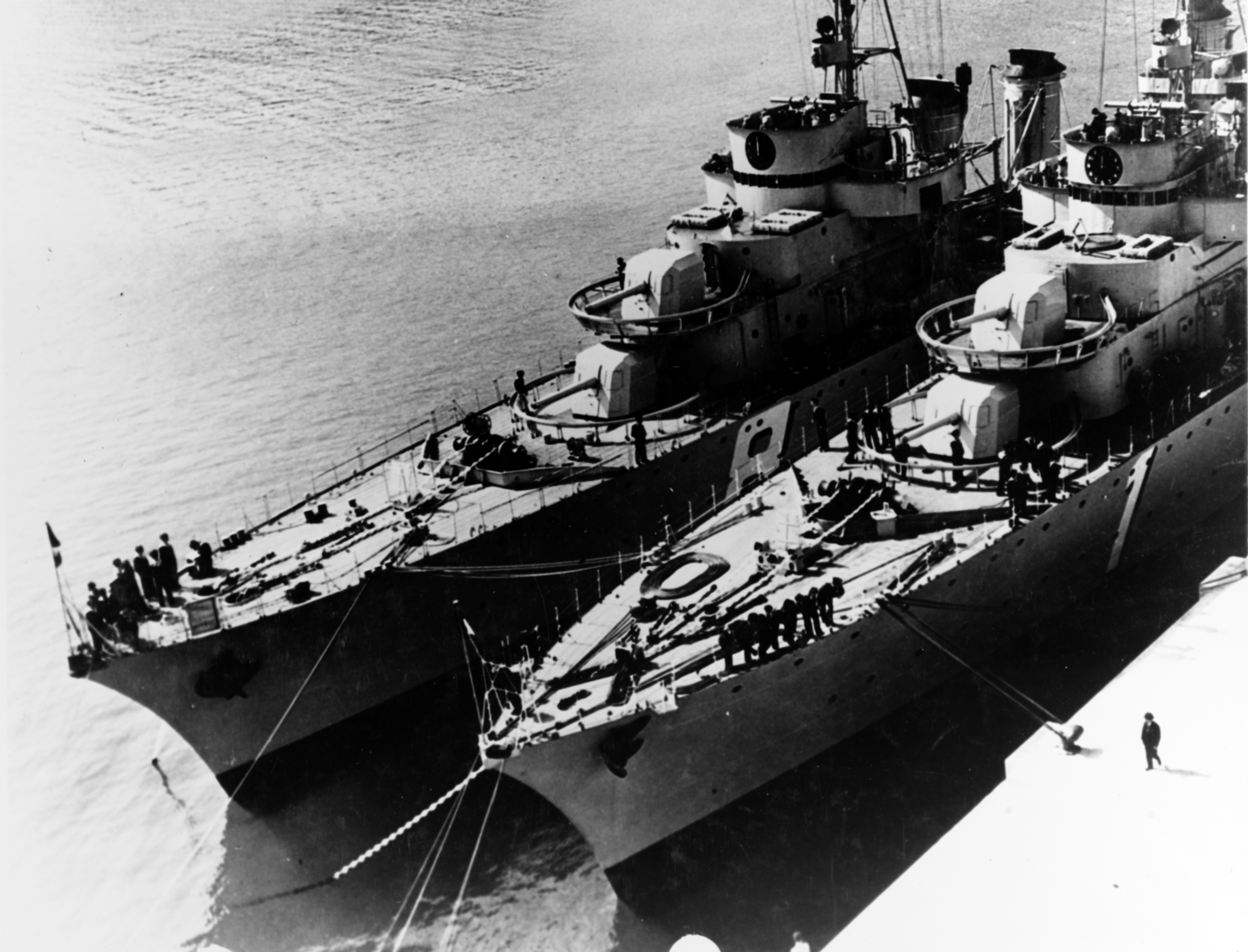
Tartu and Vauquelin docked in Monte Carlo, about 1935

The main armament of the Vauquelin-class ships consisted of five 40-caliber 138.6-millimeter (5.5 in) Modèle 1927 guns in single shielded mounts, one superfiring pair fore and aft of the superstructure and the fifth gun abaft the aft funnel. The guns were numbered '1' to '5' from front to rear. Their mounts had a range of elevation from −10° to +28°, which gave the guns a range of 16,600 meters (18,200 yd) at maximum elevation. They fired 39.9–40.2-kilogram (88–89 lb) projectiles at a muzzle velocity of 700 m/s (2,300 ft/s) at a rate of 8 to 12 rounds per minute. The Vauquelins could stow 200 rounds for each gun, plus 75 star shells for No. 2 gun.

Their secondary armament consisted of four 50-caliber semi-automatic 37-millimeter (1.5 in) Modèle 1925 anti-aircraft (AA) guns in single mounts positioned amidships. Their mounts could elevate from −15° to +80° and the guns had a maximum effective range of 5,000 meters (5,500 yd). Firing 0.73-kilogram (1.6 lb) projectiles at a muzzle velocity of 810–850 m/s (2,700–2,800 ft/s) the guns had a rate of fire of 20 rounds per minute. In addition there were two twin mounts for Hotchkiss Mitrailleuse de 13.2-millimeter (0.52 in) CA Modèle 1929 AA machine guns on the forecastle deck abreast the bridge.

The ships carried two above-water twin mounts for 550-millimeter (21.7 in) torpedo tubes, one pair on each broadside between each pair of funnels as well as one triple mount aft of the rear pair of funnels able to traverse to both sides. Their Mle 1923DT torpedoes had a 415-kilogram (915 lb) TNT warhead and could be set for a speed of 39 knots (72 km/h; 45 mph) with a range of 9,000 meters (9,800 yd) or 35 knots (65 km/h; 40 mph) for 13,000 meters (14,000 yd). A pair of depth charge chutes were built into their stern; these housed a total of sixteen 200-kilogram (440 lb) depth charges, with eight more in reserve. They were also fitted with a pair of depth-charge throwers, one on each broadside abreast the aft funnels, for which they carried a dozen 100-kilogram (220 lb) depth charges. The ships could be fitted with rails to drop forty 530-kilogram (1,170 lb) Breguet B4 mines. With a de-emphasis on anti-submarine warfare for the contre-torpilleurs, the depth-charge throwers were removed in 1936 and more 200-kilogram depth charges were carried in their place.

Fire control for the main guns was provided by a Mle 1929 electro-mechanical fire-control computer that used data provided by a 3-meter (9 ft 10 in) SOM B.1926 coincidence rangefinder atop the bridge. The computer could not compensate for the ships' motions and the guns could only be fired accurately when the ships were level. The rangefinder was replaced by a 4-meter (13 ft 1 in) OPL Mle E.1930 stereoscopic rangefinder in 1934 and the SOM rangefinder was repositioned to the base of the mainmast. The following year, Cassard was the test ship for a new 5-meter (16 ft 5 in) OPL E.1935 rangefinder in a two-man turret and an auxiliary Mle 1919 fire-control computer in the base of the turret. With the trial being successful, the new rangefinder in its turret replaced the E.1930 rangefinder in the rest of the Vauquelins in 1935–1936, although the latter was transferred to a new turret built around the base of the mainmast.

==== Wartime modifications ====
The Marine Nationale reconsidered its anti-submarine warfare tactics after the war began in September and intended to reinstate the depth-charge throwers, although these were an older model than the one previously installed. Depth-charge stowage now consisted of 24 heavy depth charges and 16 of the 100-kilogram ones for those ships that received the throwers. There was a shortage of them and only Cassard, Vauquelin and Kersaint received them beginning in May 1940. As an interim measure, a pair of rails were installed on the stern for 35-kilogram (77 lb) depth charges. Each rail could accommodate three depth charges and ten more were stored in the magazine. The Vauquelin-class ships were allocated British Alpha 128 Asdic systems in April 1940, although they were slowly installed on the surviving ships between May and the end of 1941; Chevalier Paul did not receive one before her loss in June 1941.

In May 1940, Vauquelin and Kersaint received a pair of twin-gun 37-millimeter mounts; the former lost all of her 37-millimeter guns in exchange while the latter retained a pair of her single mounts. Beginning in 1941 the Vauquelins had their anti-aircraft armament augmented, although shortages mean that most of the ships differed from each other. In general, the mainmast and the auxiliary fire-control position was replaced by a platform for a single 37-millimeter twin-gun mount and two of the single 37-millimeter mounts were transferred to the platform while the other two single mounts were removed. In addition each ship received two or four Browning 13.2-millimeter AA machine guns. Chevalier Paul's refit in January 1941 was the first to be completed and she had four 37-millimeter guns in a twin-gun mount and two singles, two single mounts for the Brownings and her original four Hotchkiss machine guns in a pair of twin-gun mounts. This was also the configuration for Tartu and Cassard. Vauquelin kept her two twin-gun 37-millimeter mounts and her original Hotchkiss mounts, and added three single Brownings. Kersaint reverted to her four original single 37-millimeter mounts, but exchanged her Hotchkiss guns for four single Brownings and also received three 25-millimeter (1 in) Hotchkiss Modèle 1925 AA guns in single mounts.

== Ships ==
Construction data
Ship	Builder	Laid down	Launched	Completed	Fate
Vauquelin	Ateliers et Chantiers de France, Dunkirk	13 March 1930	29 September 1932	3 November 1933	Scuttled in Toulon, 27 November 1942
Kersaint	Chantiers Navals Français, Caen Ateliers et Chantiers de la Loire, Saint-Nazaire	19 September 1930	14 November 1931	31 December 1933	Scuttled in Toulon, 27 November 1942
Cassard	Ateliers et Chantiers de Bretagne, Nantes	12 November 1930	8 November 1931	10 September 1933	Scuttled in Toulon, 27 November 1942
Tartu	Ateliers et Chantiers de la Loire, Saint-Nazaire	14 September 1930	7 December 1931	31 December 1932	Scuttled in Toulon, 27 November 1942
Maillé Brézé	Ateliers et Chantiers de Penhoët, Saint-Nazaire	9 October 1930	9 November 1931	6 April 1933	Lost by accidental explosion, 30 April 1940
Chevalier Paul	Forges et Chantiers de la Méditerranée, La Seyne	28 February 1931	21 March 1932	20 July 1934	Torpedoed by aircraft and sunk, 16 June 1941

== Service ==
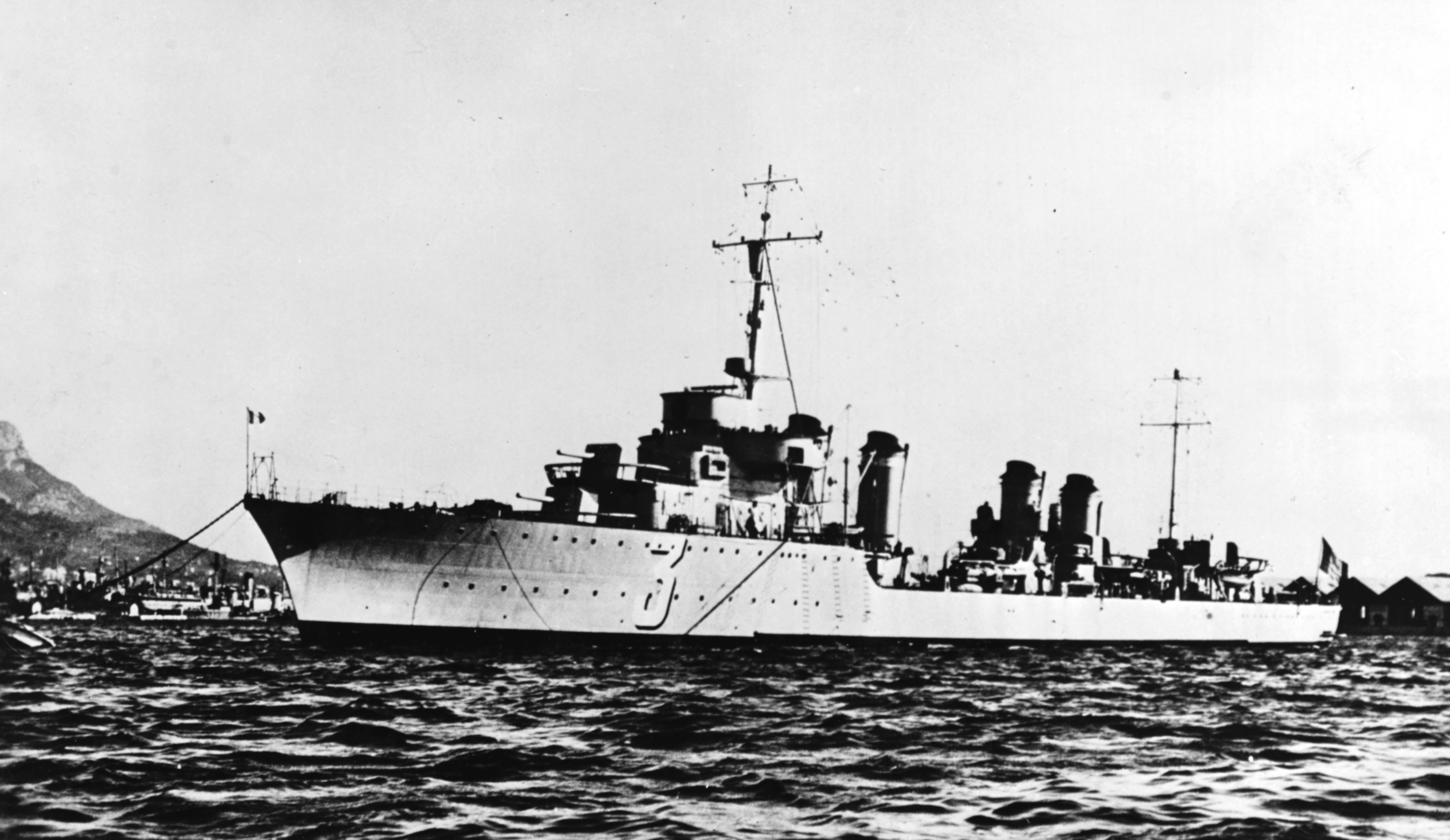
Chevalier Paul in the mid-1930s

Kersaint, Vauquelin, and Maillé Brézé were initially assigned to the 2nd Squadron (2^{e} Escadre), based in Brest while the other three were sent to the 1st Squadron (1^{e} Escadre) in Toulon. All six ships were consolidated in the 1st Squadron in October 1934. After the start of the Spanish Civil War in July 1936, Kersaint and Cassard were among the ships assigned to evacuate French citizens from Spain and later to patrol the surveillance zones assigned to France. After September most of the contre-torpilleurs and destroyers in the Mediterranean were assigned these tasks on a monthly rotation as part of the non-intervention policy.

On 27 August 1939, in anticipation of war with Nazi Germany, the French Navy planned to reorganize the Mediterranean Fleet into the Forces de haute mer of three squadrons. When France declared war on 3 September, the reorganization was ordered and the 3rd Light Squadron, which included the 5th and 9th Scout Divisions (Division de contre-torpilleurs) with all of the Vauquelin-class ships, was assigned to the 3rd Squadron. The ships of the 9th Scout Division were assigned to escort duties in the Western Mediterranean in early October, although they occasionally escorted ships in the Atlantic as well. Cassard was detached for several months to help search for German commerce raiders and blockade runners in the Atlantic. Vauquelin and Maillé Brézé escorted a pair of cruisers to Dakar, French West Africa, in October and then escorted a convoy back.

In April 1940 the 5th Scout Division with Chevalier Paul, Tartu and Maillé Brézé was tasked to escort convoys between Scotland and Norway. Beginning in mid-April they escorted two French troop convoys to Harstad and Namsos. Maillé Brézé was lost on 30 April after a torpedo accident at Greenock, Scotland. The remaining ships rejoined their sisters at Toulon at the end of May in anticipation of Italy joining the war. Four days after the Italians declared war on 10 June, Tartu, Cassard and Chevalier Paul were among the ships ordered to bombard targets in Vado Ligure. Little damage was inflicted despite the expenditure of over 1,600 rounds and two Italian MAS boats that attempted to intervene were only lightly damaged by the French.

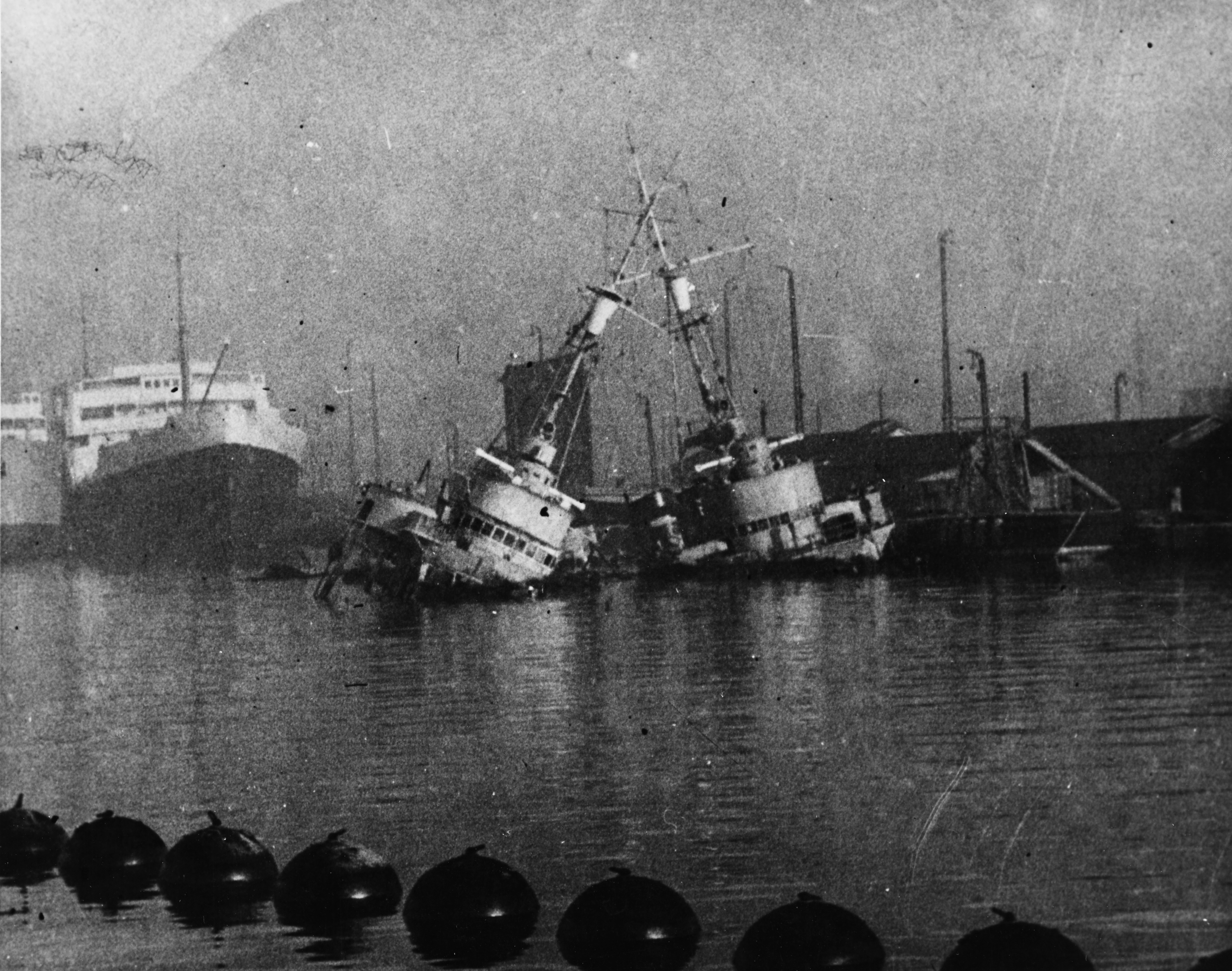
Vauquelin (left) and Kersaint scuttled in Toulon, 27 November 1942

Kersaint was present when the British attacked the French ships in Mers-el-Kébir, French Algeria, in July, but was not damaged. When the Vichy French government reestablished the Forces de haute mer (FHM) on 25 September after it negotiated rules limiting the force's activities and numbers with the Italian and German Armistice Commissions, Cassard was the only Vauquelin-class ship initially assigned; the others were placed in reserve. Chevalier Paul, Vauquelin and Tartu replaced three older Division de contre-torpilleurs in the FHM on 15 November. After the Allies invaded French Lebanon and Syria in June 1941, Chevalier Paul was dispatched to Lebanon with more ammunition for the ships there. She was sunk by British torpedo bombers en route on 16 June and Vauquelin sailed from Toulon the following day. She reached Beirut four days later; on the 29th, all three of the Division de contre-torpilleurs based there sailed for Greece to load reinforcements and supplies bound for Lebanon. They were spotted by British aircraft on their way back to Lebanon in early July and turned back in accordance with their orders. In the meantime, Tartu, Cassard and a heavy cruiser transported a battalion of infantry from Algiers, French Algeria, to Marseille between 30 June and 1 July that was intended to reinforce the Levant.

After the Allies invaded French North Africa on 8 November 1942, the Germans attempted to capture the French ships in Toulon intact on 27 November, but the four surviving sisters were scuttled by their crews. The Germans and Italians made only cursory attempts to salvage the ships, not least because three were further damaged during Allied air attacks in 1944 and they were scrapped in place between 1950 and 1956.
