= Emmanuel Ollive =

French naval officer

- Born: Emmanuel-Lucien-Henri Ollive; 18 January 1882; Rezé, France
- Died: 1 June 1950 (aged 68); La Seyne-sur-Mer, France
- Military career
- Allegiance: France
- Branch: French Navy
- Rank: Amiral

Emmanuel Ollive (18 January 1882 – 1 June 1950) was a French naval officer who served in the First and Second World Wars.

== Naval career ==
Son of a long-haul captain, he entered the École Navale (Naval School) in October 1899 and graduated as a 1st class midshipman ( October 1902 ), he embarked on the destroyer Dague in French Algeria then served on the armored cruiser Montcalm in the Far East division.

Promoted ensign in October 1904, he went to Kersaint where he headed a detachment of sailors responsible for protecting the French legation in Seoul during the Russo-Japanese War. In 1906, he became a maneuver officer on the destroyer La Hire in the Mediterranean squadron. Student at the School of Torpedo Officers on the cruiser Amiral Cécille in Toulon, he graduated patented August 1908 with an official testimony of satisfaction.

Assistant to the torpedo service on the semi-dreadnought battleship Patrie in the Mediterranean squadron (1909) then assistant to the electricity-torpedo service on the armored cruiser Waldeck-Rousseau, he was appointed lieutenant in October 1911 then became a student of the School of Gunnery in Toulon (1912) and from the School of Application of Sea Shot aboard the armored cruiser Pothuau, he obtained the exit price there and the Minister's thanks for a note on fire control devices (August- December 1912 ).

Second gunner officer on the semi-dreadnought Mirabeau in 1913, he served on land during the First World War on the French front where he commanded a battery from the regiment of sea gunners then, in 1917, the 2nd group of river gunboats.

In 1918, he was appointed to command the torpedo boat Fauconneau in the Levant and Salonika. Lieutenant-Commander ( July 1919 ), he commanded in December the torpedo boat Téméraire in the Baltic squadron.

Aide-de-camp to Admiral Sagot-Duvauroux, maritime prefect of Toulon in 1921, he was promoted to frigate captain ( February 1922 ), he served as second of Pothuau in the division of Mediterranean schools and joined the commission for practical studies of naval artillery.

In 1924, he commanded the destroyer Algerian and the 2nd torpedo squadron and obtained two testimonies of satisfaction for the shooting competitions of 1924 and 1925. Head of the Radio Transmissions Service at Toulon (1926), he presided over the TSF practical study commission.

Captain ( July 1927 ), Chief of Staff of Admiral Doctor, he drew up a study on combat artillery which was authoritative and allowed him to be appointed in July 1929 to command the armored cruiser Gueydon and at the presidency of the Commission of practical studies of the naval artillery.

In 1932, he went to the War School and the Center for Advanced Naval Studies and was promoted to rear admiral in February 1933. Chief of Staff of Admiral Herr, Inspector General of the Northern Maritime Forces, Major General in Brest, he commands May 1935 the 1st squadron destroyer group in Toulon and then July 1936 3 Light Wing.

Vice Admiral in February 1937, the first Deputy Chief of the General Staff of the Navy, he was promoted Squadron vice-admiral in March. Commander in Chief of the Mediterranean Squadron ( March 1938 ), maritime prefect of Toulon ( September 1938 ), he receives in May 1939 the command in chief of the Mediterranean Fleet with his flag on the battleship Provence and then in November, that of the maritime forces of the South Atlantic and Africa.

Commander-in-chief and maritime prefect of the 4th region in Algiers July 1940 – October 1942), he was promoted to admiral in November 1940 and was responsible for the protection of supply convoys intended for the mainland. He retired in January 1943.

== Awards ==
- Knight ( 21 May 1915 ), Officer ( 1 September 1920 ), Commander ( 10 July 1934 ) then Grand Officer of the Legion of Honor ( 29 December 1939 )
- War Cross (1917)

== Bibliography ==
- Halpern, Paul G., ed. (2016). The Mediterranean Fleet, 1930–1939. Publications of the Navy Records Society. Vol. 163. London: Routledge for the Navy Records Society. ISBN 978-1-4724-7597-8.
- Taillemite, Etienne (1982). Dictionnaire des marins français. Paris: Editions maritimes et d'Outre-Mer. OCLC 470113586.
