= German Armistice Commission =

World War II German government agency (1940–1942)

The German Armistice Commission (German: Waffenstillstandskommission, WAKO) was a military body charged with supervising the implementation of the Franco-German Armistice, signed on 22 June 1940, in German-occupied France during World War II. The armistice came into effect at the same time as the Franco-Italian Armistice on 25 June monitored by a comparable Italian Armistice Commission. The commission's seat was at Wiesbaden in Germany, in the building that is now the Hessian State Chancellery.

The German Armistice Commission was created under Article 22 of the Armistice which stated that the "Armistice Commission, acting in accordance with the direction of the German High Command, will regulate and supervise the carrying out of the armistice agreement. It is the task of the Armistice Commission further to insure [sic] the necessary conformity of this agreement with the Italian-French armistice." In addition, the "French Government will send a delegation to the seat of the German Armistice Commission to represent the French wishes and to receive regulations from the German Armistice Commission for executing [the agreement]."

The Commission’s active work ended with Case Anton in November 1942.

== See also ==
- Vichy France
- Case Anton
