= Baie de Douarnenez =

Bay in French Brittany

Coordinates: 48.15°N 4.4°W

Location map

The Baie de Douarnenez (French pronunciation: [bɛ də dwaʁnəne]; Breton: Bae Douarnenez) is a bay in Finistère, France, between the Crozon Peninsula to the north and the Cap Sizun to the south. It is a vast semi-circular basin over 16 kilometres (9.9 mi; 8.6 nmi) wide and 20 kilometres (12 mi; 11 nmi) from its entrance to the opposite shore. Although half closed off to the west by Cap de la Chèvre, it opens out again to a width of 9 kilometres (5.6 mi; 4.9 nmi) on the side of the Mer d'Iroise. To the south-east is the port of Douarnenez, which was the center of a large sardine industry in the early 20th century. The bay was named after it. Douarnenez is the only settlement of importance on the banks of the bay. The bathing station at Morgat is located to the north, on the Crozon peninsula.

The mythical town of Ys, which legend says was engulfed by the ocean, is commonly said to be located in this bay.

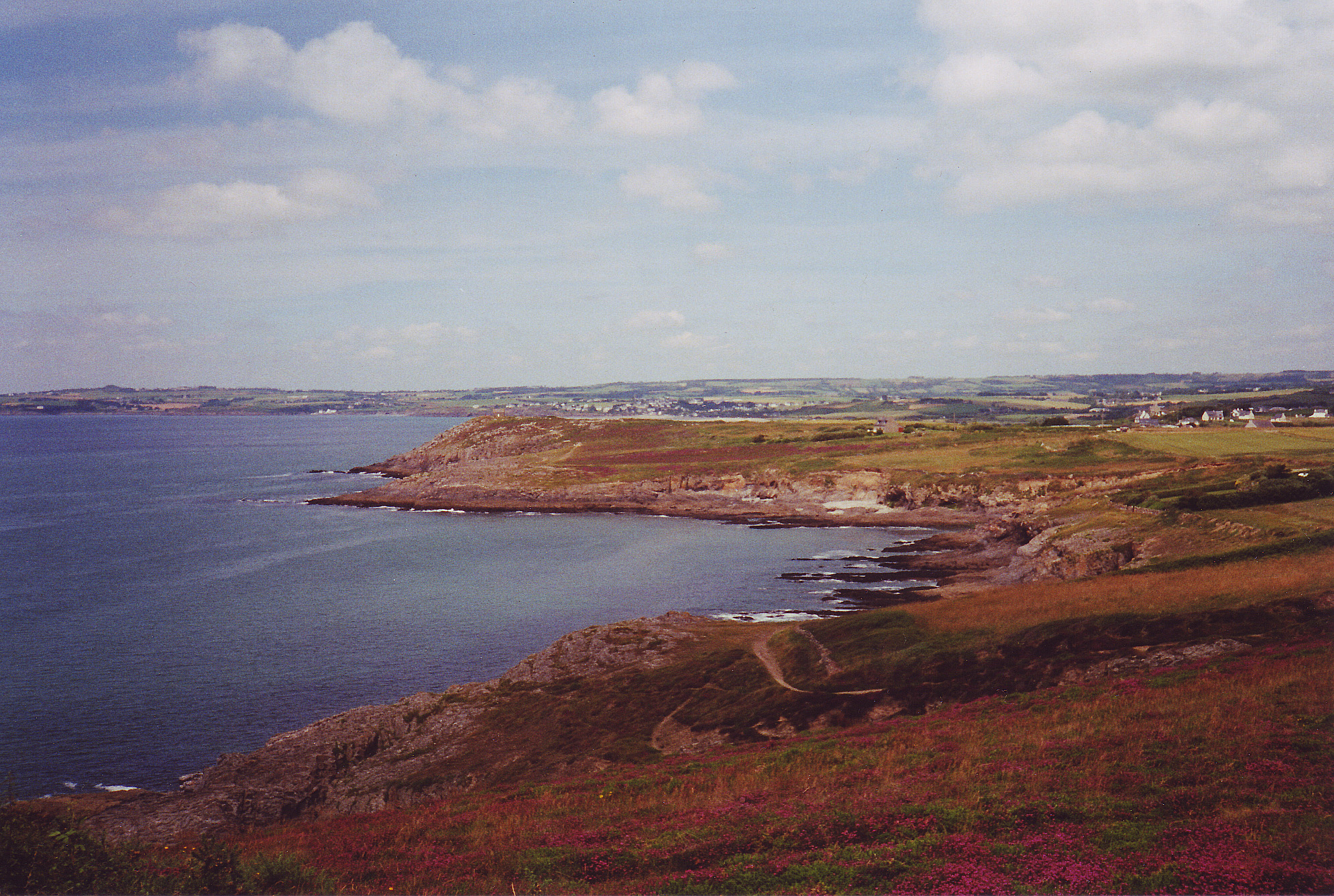

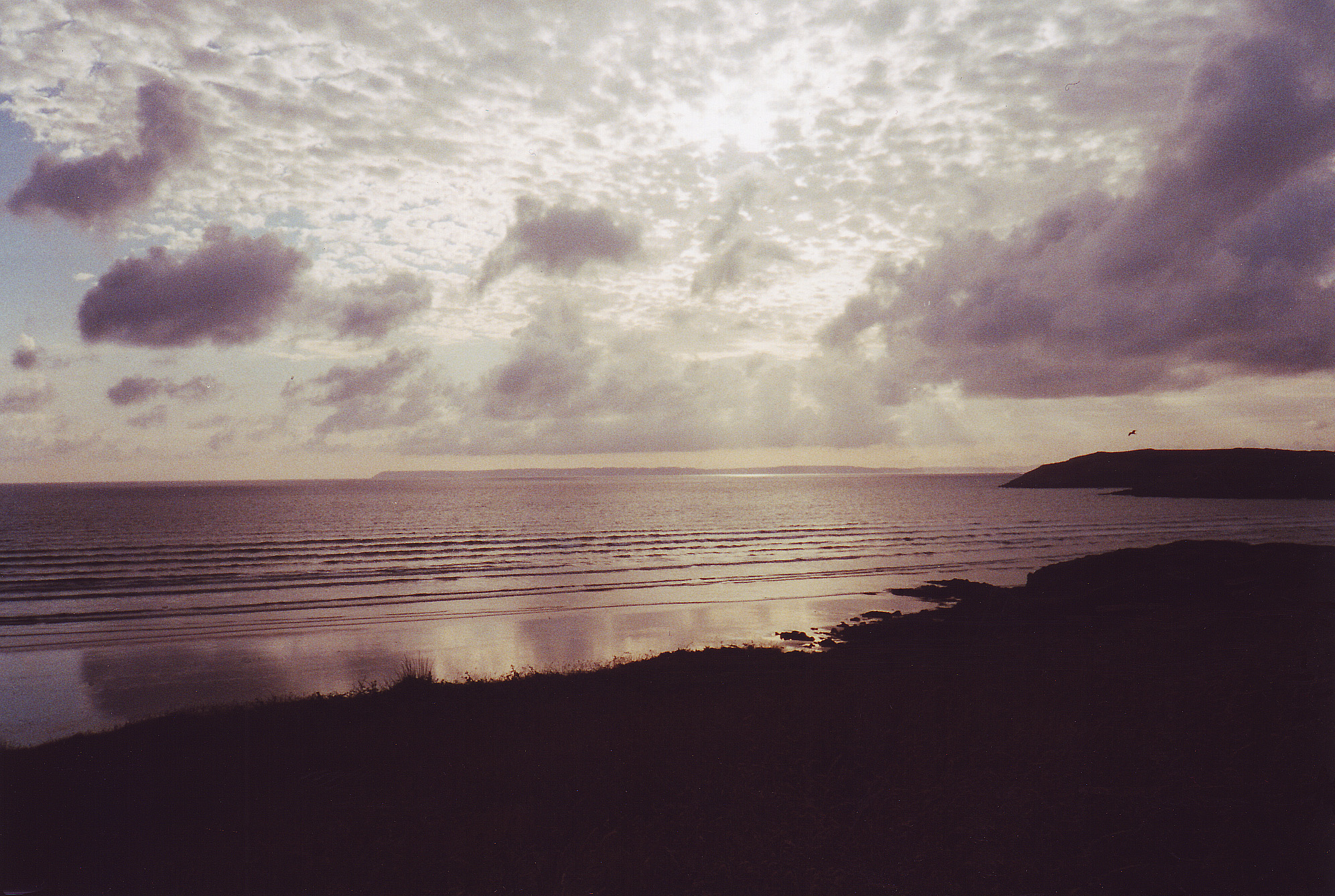
