= Lloyd's War Medal for Bravery at Sea =

British Merchant Navy medal of World War 2

Medal's ribbon bar

The Lloyd's War Medal for Bravery at Sea is one of the four Lloyd's Medal types bestowed by Lloyd's of London. In 1939, with the coming of the Second World War, Lloyd's set up a committee to find means of honouring seafarers who performed acts of exceptional courage at sea, and this resulted in the announcement on 27 December 1940 of the "Lloyd’s War Medal for Bravery at Sea".

The first awards were announced in March 1941. The first two were to Captain Rowland Morris-Woolfenden MBE and Sub-Lieutenant Patrick Wills-Rust RNR, who had been Master and Second Officer respectively of the coaster Abukir. On the night of 27–28 May 1940, the last day of the Battle of Belgium, she had evacuated over 200 soldiers and civilians from Ostend. She survived 90 minutes of attacks by enemy aircraft and 20 minutes of attack by an E-boat before being torpedoed and sunk.

All awards were for acts during the Second World War. The last were announced in October 1948. In all 541 Lloyd's War Medals for Bravery at Sea were awarded. Four were awarded to women: Miss Victoria Drummond, Miss M. E.Ferguson, Miss E. M. Owen, and Mrs. E. Plumb.

Recipients
Name	Notes	Role	Vessel	Date
Adamson, R. S.	C	Chief Engineer	Silvercedar	22 December 1940
Aldis, T. J.	DSC	Master	Royal Sovereign	9 December 1940
Allan, G. G.	MBE	6th Engineer	Scottish Heather	27 December 1942
Allerton, J.	MBE	Chief Officer	Sampa	17 February 1945
Allister, J. I.	DSC	4th Engineer	Narkunda	14 November 1942
Alison, A. G.	DSM	Apprentice	Clan Ferguson	26 September 1941
Andersen, J. J.	*MBE	2nd Engineer	Amerika	21 April 1943
Anderson, L. B.	MBE	Master	Lady Olga	24 February 1944
Anderson, S.	† C	OS	Shakespear	5 January 1941
Anderson, W. R.	DSM	Gunner	Dorset	13 August 1942
Andrews, C. M.	OBE	Master	Waiwera	29 June 1942
Andrews, E.	BEM	Fireman	Tucurinca	10 March 1943
Andrews, F. G.	MBE	1st Radio Officer	Patella	19 April 1942
Anholm, E. S.	MBE	2nd Officer	Harberton	19 August 1941
Armitage, C. H.	GM	AB	Lulworth Hill	19 March 1943
Armitage, F. A.	MBE	2nd Officer	Scalaria	19 October 1942
Armstrong, R. W.	BEM	Apprentice	Pinna	3 February 1942
Arntsen, S.	*MBE	Chief Officer	Frontenac	27 October 1942
Atkinson, J. R.	GM	Master	Calcium	30 December 1940
Austin, H.	OBE	Master	Southgate	1 May 1942
Ayres, R. H.	MBE	2nd Officer	Gairsoppa	16 February 1941
Bacon, N. J.	MBE	Chief Radio Officer	Rosenborg	8 June 1942
Bailey, H.	DSM	Carpenter	Narkunda	14 November 1942
Bainbridge, R. W. C.	MBE	2nd Engineer	Clan Macbean	2 May 1940
Ballantyne, A.	OBE	Chief Engineer	Broomdale	20 May 1940
Banning, A.	DSO	Master	Rathlin	July 1942
Bantz, M. H.	*MBE	Master	Dagmar	9 June 1941
Barker, G. T.	† C	Radio Officer	Kenordoc	15 September 1940
Barnes, E. L.	GM	2nd Officer	Severn Leigh	23 August 1940
Barrance, R. A.	C	Gunner	Alexia	2 August 1940
Barrett, M. W. K.	C	Senior Radio Officer	Saltwick	21 October 1943
Bastian, G. L.	AM (later exchanged for the GC), MBE	2nd Engineer	Empire Bowman	30 March 1943
Bateman, B.	MBE	Chief Engineer	Lieutenant Robert Mory	10 February 1942
Beavis, B	MBE	Chief Officer	Anglo Canadian	25 January 1942
Beckett, C	BEM	Donkeyman	British Colony	14 September 1943
Bekken, A. N.	*OBE	Chief Engineer	Svend Foyn	7 October 1941
Bell, J. B.	MBE	2nd Engineer	Thorold	22 August 1940
Bell, S.	C	Chief Engineer	Moorwood	11 June 1941
Bennell, C. D.	† C	Chief Steward	San Emiliano	9 August 1942
Bennett, A. S.	MBE	3rd Engineer	Sutlej	26 February 1944
Bergstrom, E.	BEM	Carpenter	Anglo Canadian	6 April 1942
Bermingham, C. F.	BEM	Ship's Cook	Empire Eve	18 May 1943
Biggs, J. H.	CBE	Master	Strathallan	21 December 1942
Bird, W.	OBE	Master	Chilka	11 March 1942
Black, R. A.	C	2nd Officer	Goodwood	10 September 1939
Blackhall, G.	MBE	3rd Officer	San Alvaro	23 February 1944
Blundell, T. W.	BEM	Fireman	Port Nicholson	16 June 1942
Blyth, D. K.	OBE	Master	San Gaspar	18 July 1942
Blyth, J. H.	OBE, DSC	Master	Menelaus	1 February 1943
Bond, D. N.	MBE	2nd Engineer	Alacrity	5 March 1942
Booth, E. G.	MBE	7th Engineer	San Eliseo	18 May 1942
Bradley, N. R.	† C	Assistant Engineer	Cornish City	29 July 1943
Bramley, T. E.	GM	Chief Engineer	Calcium	30 December 1940
Breet, J.	C	Chief Officer	Leto	12 May 1942
Brockman, V. D.	BEM	Jr OS	Lady Brassey	24 July 1944
Broderick, T.	C	AB	Goodwood	10 September 1939
Brodie, G.	MBE	3rd Engineer	San Eliseo	18 May 1942
Brown, F. B.	C	Chief Officer	Arandora Star	2 July 1940
Brown, R.	DSC	Master	Deucalion	11 August 1942
Brown, S. L.	BEM	Gunner	Keynes	11 January 1940
Bruce, R. L.	OBE	Master	Cardita	1 May 1941
Brundle, R. W.	OBE	Master	Harmatris	17 January 1942
Burnett, J. H.	C	Radio Officer	Sire	31 May 1941
Burns, R. V.	GM	Chief Officer	Duchess of York	14 March 1943
Butler, E. J.	GM	AB/Gunlayer	Mostyn	23 January 1941
Butler, J.	BEM	A/AB	Robert W. Pomeroy	1 April 1942
Byatt, S.	MBE	3rd Radio Officer	Corabella	30 April 1943
Byrne, D. A.	BEM	Greaser	Scottish Heather	27 December 1942
Caird, A. M.	OBE	Master	Eurylochus	29 January 1941
Callegari, W. J.	C	A/AB	Warfield	15 August 1943
Cameron, J.	MBE, OBE	Chief Officer	Empire Wave	2 October 1941
Cameron, J. S.	OBE	Master	Baron Elgin	30 October 1942
Cameron, R.	BEM	AB	Dallington Court	14 February 1941
Campbell, E. R.	† C	Assistant Radio Officer	Empire Toucan	29 June 1940
Campbell, N. W.	MBE	Chief Radio Officer	St. Patrick	13 June 1941
Cargill, A. F.	OBE	Master	Gowrie	9 January 1940
Caroline, H.M.	BEM	AB	Empire Strait	27 April 1941
Carroll, S.	BEM	OS	Empire Strait	27 April 1941
Carswell, H.J., M.M.	DSM, BEM	CH, Steward	Empire Tide	3 July 1942
Carters, T.	† C	Fireman	San Florentino	1 October 1941
Catling, C. V.	OBE	Master	Birtley	15 September 1941
Cavanaugh, K.	† C	Pte/Gunner	Oud Beijerland	27 March 1941
Chafer, A. J.	OBE	Chief Engineer	City of Lancaster	14 June 1943
Chalker, E.	BEM	Cook & Steward	Cormount	20 June 1941
Champion, S. F.	OBE	Master	Bhutan	14 June 1940
Chapman, T. W.	BEM	Carpenter	Empire Chaucer	17 October 1942
Chard, R.	MBE	2nd Engineer	Alipore	30 September 1942
Chisholm, W.	AM †	Ship's Surgeon	Stentor	27 October 1942
Chivers, G. F.	MBE	Chief Officer	Silvercedar	15 October 1941
Chou, C.	C	Pumpman	Maja	15 January 1945
Church, L. C.	OBE	Master	Franche-Comté	16 March 1941
Claesson, I.	BEM	Greaser	Scotia	12 April 1942
Clark, E. R.	C	Chief Officer	Scottish Standard	21 February 1941
Clark, F. R.	† C	1st Radio Officer	British Resource	14 March 1942
Clark, I. A.	BEM	Apprentice	Congella	24 October 1943
Clarke, D. O.	GC †	Apprentice	San Emiliano	9 August 1942
Clarke, G. L.	C	Master	Walmer Castle	21 September 1941
Clarke, H. S.	DSC, MBE	Chief Officer	Asphalion	11 February 1944
Cliff, R. W. A.	MBE	2nd Officer	Crista	17 March 1942
Coates, C.	C	Donkeyman	Newminster	25 July 1940
Coates, J. L.	OBE	Chief Engineer	Twickenham	15 July 1943
Coe, A. H.	C	Dock Pilot		7 September 1940 & 18 September 1940
Cole, E.	C	Chief Engineman	Windsor	3 August 1940 & 23 October 1940
Cole, R. F.	MBE	Chief Radio Officer	Clan Macarthur	12 August 1943
Coleman, C. A.	OBE	Radio Officer	Keynes	11 January 1940
Coleman, N. M.	MBE	3rd Radio Officer	British Resource	14 March 1942
Collier, T.	MBE	Chief Officer	Gwynwood	4 February 1941
Comber, W.	C	Radio Officer	Doric Star	2 December 1939
Cook, L. A.	MBE	3rd Officer	Brittany	29 October 1942
Cooke, K.	GM	Carpenter	Lulworth Hill	19 March 1943
Copeland, B. M.	OBE	Chief Officer	Athenia	3 September 1939
Copeland, W.	C	Fireman/Tmr	Chevy Chase	9 March 1940
Coultas, E.	OBE	Master	Clan Macbean	2 May 1940
Covill, B. C.	BEM	A/AB, Gunner	Adam's Beck	30 July 1941
Cowper, J. E.	MBE	Chief Engineer	Empire Crusader	8 August 1940
Craggs, C.	OBE	Chief Engineer	British Merit	24 July 1942
Craston, R. S.	OBE	Master	Ena de Larrinaga	5 April 1941
Creser, R. D.	GM	Chief Officer	Harpagon	19 April 1942
Cromarty, A.	OBE	Master	Holmpark	24 October 1942
Crook, D.	GM	2nd Officer	Scottish Heather	27 December 1942
Croxford, P. P.	BEM	OS	Sussex	30 September 1940
Currie, C. S.	† C	Chief Engineer	Clan Macarthur	12 August 1943
Cusworth, G. E.	MBE	Chief Engineer	Rosenborg	8 June 1942
Dalziel, A.	BEM	OS	Benvorlich	19 March 1941
Dalziel, J. J.	BEM	Carpenter	Loch Ranza	3 February 1942
Damiens, P. J.	*MBE	3rd Officer	Jean Jadot	20 January 1943
Dark, W. F.	C	Master	Titan	4 September 1940
Davey, R. E. N.	C	AB	Pauletta	2 March 1944
Davies, C. W.	MBE	Chief Officer	Cormount	20 June 1941
Davies, D. J.	OBE	Chief Officer	Athelknight	26 May 1942
Davies, D. S.	MBE	Chief Officer	Empire Endurance	20 April 1941
Davis, A. C.	BEM	Boatswain	Walmer Castle	21 September 1941
Davis, W. H. V.	MBE	T/2nd Engr	Broomdale	20 May 1940
Decker, G. A.	BEM	Cadet	Empire Guidon	31 October 1942
Dennis, D. W.	GM	Chief Radio Officer	San Emiliano	9 August 1942
Depledge, L.	C	Steward	Sanfry	25 July 1940
Dew, G.	† C	Donkeyman	Macumba	6 August 1943
Diggins, S.	OBE; Also awarded Lloyd's Medal, for Meritorious Services—Silver	Master	St. Essylt	4 July 1943
Dingle, E. W.	MBE	2nd Officer	Port Brisbane	21 November 1940
Donn, W.	C	Boatswain	Yewarch	7 December 1940
Donovan, J. D.	OBE	Master	Athelsultan	22 September 1942
van Dorst, R. F.	C	3rd Officer	Lubrafol	9 May 1942
Dowie, J.	BEM	AB	Empire Strait	27 April 1941
Draper, C.	MBE	3rd Officer	Accrington	2 February 1943
Drummond, Miss V. A.	MBE	2nd Engineer	Bonita	25 August 1940
Dryden, W. J.	BEM	AB	Regent Lion	15 September 1940
Duff, G. M.	GM	Master	Empire Glade	28 November 1942
Duncan, E. B.	† C	Senior Radio Officer	Tilawa	24 November 1942
Duval, B.J.	C	Cadet	Domala	2 March 1940
Eagles, T. H.	BEM	Apprentice	Treverbyn	8 December 1940
Edwards, J. N.	C	Master	Trevanion	22 October 1939
Edwards, R. F.	C	AB	Satellite	25 September 1940
Elliott, E. G.	BEM	Seaman	Umona	30 March 1941
Elliott, G. N.	MBE	4th Officer	Ville de Strasbourg	1 January 1943
Ellis, R. C.	MBE	3rd Officer	Swedru	16 April 1941
Elstob, E. H.	C	Messroom Boy	Catford	31 May 1943
Evans, C. K.	OBE	Master	Hazelside	28 October 1941
Evans, D. M. L.	MBE	2nd Officer	Earlston	5 July 1942
Eyton Jones, W.E.R.	OBE	Master	Benvrackie	13 May 1941
Fairhurst, '1'. H.	MBE	Chief Officer	Devon Coast	2 December 1943
Fenn, E. J.	OBE	Chief Officer	Derrymore	13 February 1942
Ferguson, J. A. F.	OBE	Chief Officer	Llangibby Castle	16 January 1942
Ferguson, Miss M. E.	BEM	Passenger	Avila Star	5 July 1942
Finch, T. D.	GM	Chief Officer	San Emiliano	9 August 1942
Flett, J.	MBE	Radio Officer	San Casimiro	15 March 1941
Fook, L.	C	Seaman	Tai Koo	12 September 1941
Fookes, C.	GM	Apprentice	San Cipriano	10 January 1943
Fortune, H. M.	BEM	Apprentice	Ascot	19 February 1944
Foulkes, H.	OBE	Chief Engineer	Omega	1 October 1943
Fox, C.	CBE	Master	Orcades	10 October 1942
Foy, C. A.	† C	Master	Retriever	11 April 1941
Francis, W.	BEM	Ship's Cook	Rangitane	26 November 1940
Francis, W. J.	MBE	Master	Dalegarth Force	28 June 1944
Freeman, S.	BEM	A/AB	San Florentino	1 November 1941
Frisken, A.	OBE	Chief Engineer	Alpera	22 May 1943
Frost, J.	MBE	4th Engineer	Corbis	18 April 1943
Fry, A. E.	BEM	Sailor	Afric Star	13 March 1941
Gaffney, T.	OBE	Master	British Judge	28 February 1942
Gair, J.	MBE	Chief Officer	Fort Qu'Appelle	16 May 1942
Gallagher, J.	C	3rd Engineer	Fort Louisbourg	29 January 1944
Gardiner, R. E.	MBE	Chief Officer	Shahristan	29 July 1941
Gardner, E. A.	BEM	Boatswain	Ocean Voyager	19 March 1943
Garstin, G. K.	MBE	Radio Officer	River Afton	5 July 1942
Gentles, C. A.	OBE	Master	Everleigh	December 40
Gerard, M. R.	† C	Radio Officer	Empire Toucan	29 June 1940
Gibbon, W. E.	MBE	2nd Engineer	Rosenborg	8 June 1942
Gibbons, H. A.	BEM	AB	Cerne	19 August 1941
Gibson, H. E.	MBE	Senior 3rd Engineer	Loch Katrine	3 August 1942
Gibson, J. T.	MBE	Chief Officer	Nephrite	9 March 1945
Gilbert, O. F. H.	† C	2nd Engineer	Pitwines	11 November 1940
Gilchrist, D. C.	MBE	3rd Officer	City of Shanghai	6 May 1941
Gill, W.	C	AB	Goodwood	10 September 1939
Godfrey, V. T. B.	MBE	Chief Engineer	Atheltemplar	1 March 1941
Goodall, C. H.	BEM	Steward	Strathallan	21 December 1942
Gordon, P. A. T.	DSM	Apprentice	Dorset	13 August 1942
Gorman, T. C.	OBE	Chief Engineer	Peterton	17 September 1942
Gott, A.	C	Seaman	Laurieston	9 February 1940
Granger, G. C.	BEM	AB	Ville de Strasbourg	1 January 1943
Granstrom, F. O.	BEM	Fireman	Scotia	12 April 1942
Grant, F. S.	MBE	2nd Engineer	Torinia	21 September 1940
Greenway, E. H.	OBE	Chief Engineer	Fort Buckingham	20 January 1944
Gregson, J. S.	AM	Apprentice	Deucalion	11 August 1942
Grey, P.	GM	Chief Steward	River Afton	5 July 1942
Griffiths, E. O.	BEM	Seaman	British Premier	24 December 1940
Griffiths, W. I.	DSC	2nd Engineer	Empire Tide	3 July 1942
Grinstead, L. V.	MBE	3rd Engineer	San Florentino	1 October 1941
Hackston, G. W.	MBE	Radio Officer	Haxby	24 April 1940
Haig, G.	OBE	Chief Officer	Sydney Star	24 July 1941
Haines, S.D.	MBE	Chief Radio Officer	Empire Zeal	2 November 1942
Hair, J.T.	CBE, DSO	Master	Empire Selwyn	25 May 1942
Ham, H. G.	BEM	Cadet	Athelsultan	22 September 1942
Hammett, R. G.	OBE	Master	Severn Leigh	23 August 1940
Hansen, H.	C	Chief Officer	Nyholt	17 January 1942
Harper, H. W.	OBE †	Master	Muncaster Castle	30 March 1942
Harris, W. H.	† C	1st Radio Officer	Tanda	15 July 1944
Harris, W. J.	OBE	Master	New Westminster City	3 April 1942
Harrison, W. G.	CBE	Master	Troilus	14 June 1942
Hart, T.	MBE	2nd Engineer	Dalegarth Force	28 June 1944
Hartley, W. J.	DSC	Master	Copeland	13 September 1942
Hartridge, J.	DSM	T/Cpl R.M.	Ganges	6 April 1942
Harvey, D. N.	C	Seaman	Laurieston	9 February 1940
Harvey, F. W.	DSO	Master	Empire Tide	3 July 1942
Harvey, W.	BEM	Boatswain	Athenia	3 September 1939
Hauje, J.	†MBE	2nd Officer	Ringen	4 July 1944
Hawkins, E.	AM	A/AB/ Gunlayer	British Dominion	10 January 1943
Hay, D.	AM	Cadet	Eurylochus	29 January 1941
Hay, J. W. E.	† C	Chief Radio Officer	City of Bath	1 December 1942
Hayes, C.	BEM	AB	Ross	29 October 1942
Heap, J. M.	MBE	3rd Engineer	Corbis	18 April 1943
Hedley, W.	C	AB	Empire Bard	7 May 1943
Henderson, R. H.	† C	Cadet	Corinaldo	29 October 1942
Hennerty, M.	† C	1st Radio Officer	Auris	28 June 1941
Hersee, C. E. W.	C	Master	Fowberry Tower	12 May 1941
Hickling, E. A.	OBE	Chief Officer	Waiwera	29 June 1942
Highley, G. W.	OBE †	Master	San Cipriano	10 January 1943
Hill, A.	OBE	Master	Mandasor	24 January 1941
Hill, H. V.	† C	Cook	Walmer Castle	21 September 1941
Hobson, F.	† C	AB	Inishtrahull	13 September 1940
Hope, P. K.	† C	AB	Starling	12 October 1940
Horn, T. S.	OBE	Master	Sydney Star	24 July 1941
Hotham, H.	GM	2nd Engineer	Ocean Voyager	19 March 1943
Howes, G. D.	GM	2nd Officer	Peterton	17 September 1942
Hughes, A. H.	DSC	Chief Engineer	Empire Tide	3 July 1942
Hughes, F. M.	C	AB	San Fabian	28 August 1942
Humphrey, R. C. V.	† C	2nd Radio Officer	Tanda	15 July 1944
Hutchinson, W.	† C	Steward	Avonwood	12 December 1942
Hyde, J.	MBE	Ship's Surgeon	Neptuna	19 February 1942
Inglis, J.	GM	2nd Officer	Loch Ranza	3 February 1942
Ingram, E. B.	OBE	Master	Pampas	26 March 1942
Jakobsen, G.	*OBE	Master	Victo	8 November 1941
James, S. O.	BEM	OS	Empire Lightning	5 November 1943
Jarman, W. C.	BEM	Deck Hand	Ben Screel	2 June 1941
Jennings, G.W.	MBE	Ch. Radio Offr	San Demetrio	17 March 1942
Jensen, L.V.	BEM	Boatswain	Pacific Grove	23 September 1940
Jewell, W.E.	C	Clr Sgt RM/Gunner	Sanfry	25 July 1940
Johnson, A. H.	GM	Chief Engineer	W. B. Walker	29 January 1941
Johnson, J. W.	C	Master	Alexander Kennedy	22 February 1945
Johnson, R.	MBE	3rd Officer	Thursobank	22 March 1942
Johnston, D.	C	AB	Scottish Standard	21 February 1941
Johnston, P.	OBE	Master	San Eliseo	18 May 1942
Jones, J. L.	BEM	Apprentice	San Demetrio	5 November 1940
Jones, O. T.	C	Master	Helena Margareta	8 April 1941
Jones, P. D.	C	3rd Officer	Shakespear	5 January 1941
Jones, S. K.	† C	Chief Radio Officer	Turakina	20 August 1940
Kale, A. E.	BEM	Fireman	Empire Avocet	29 September 1942
Kearon, R. S.	OBE	Master	Assyrian	19 October 1940
Keating, W. McC.	MBE	Chief Officer	Bolton Castle	5 July 1942
Keay, S. W.	OBE	Chief Officer	Duchess of York	11 July 1943
Kelly, E.	OBE	Chief Engineer	Alexia	9 August 1942
Kelly, P. A.	MBE	Chief Officer	RMS Lady Hawkins	19 January 1942
Kennedy, N.	OBE	Chief Engineer	Ocean Viceroy	29 March 1943
Kerr, D.	OBE	Chief Officer	Kenordoc	15 September 1940
Kerr, J.	OBE	Master	Baron Nairn	7 June 1941
Kerrison, W.J.	BEM	AB	Melrose Abbey	27 December 1942
Kiely, N.	BEM	AB	Thorold	22 August 1940
Kippins, T.	OBE, DSC	Master	Port Gisborne	11 October 1940
Kirby, W. H.	MBE	2nd Engineer	Patella	19 April 1942
Klemp, J. W.	OBE	Master	Petrel	26 September 1941
Knell, A.J.	MBE, DSC	Chief Officer	Port Fairy	11 July 1943
Knight, H. R.	BEM	Senior Apprentice	British Viscount	3 April 1941
Knott, G. A. H.	OBE	Master	San Alvaro	23 February 1944
Lakin, J. B.	C	4th Engineer	Narkunda	14 November 1942
Langan, E.	MBE	2nd Engineer	Yorkwood	8 January 1943
Larsen, E.	BEM	Pumpman	Frontenac	27 October 1942
Laurenson, L.	C	Master	Togston	8 March 1941
Lawrence, A. A.	MBE	Master	Newminster	25 July 1940
Lawson, A.	MBE	Chief Officer	Wahner Castle	21 September 1941
Lawson, H.	MBE	Master	Sanfry	25 July 1940
Lawson, J.	C	Deck Hand	Sanfry	25 July 1940
Lawton, W.J.	C	Boatswain	Harpagus	20 May 1941
Lewis, J. R.	OBE	Master	Vulcain	23 May 1941
Leybourne, N.	DSC	2nd Officer	Empire Metal	2 January 1943
Liddle, R.	† C	4th Officer	Arandora Star	2 July 1940
Light, S. H.	GM	AB	Port Gisborne	11 October 1940
Littledale, W. J.	MBE	2nd Engineer	Broomdale	20 May 1940
Lochtie, P.D.	MBE	2nd Engineer	Ocean Viceroy	29 March 1943
Locke, J.C.	BEM	Skipper	Mizpah	1 July 1943
Lofthouse, F.S.	OBE, DSC	Master	Clan Ferguson	26 September 1941
Longthorpe, N. E.	BEM	AB	Cormount	12 November 1943
Low, D. A.	BEM	Carpenter	Perth	18 November 1942
Lowrie, J. K.	MBE	2nd Engineer	Orminster	25 August 1944
Ludlow, P. G.	MBE	Chief Engineer	Birtley	15 September 1941
Ludlow, T.	MBE	Chief Officer	Terlings	21 July 1940
Lupton, E. R.	† C	2nd Officer	Empire Cromwell	28 November 1942
Lyne, H.	MBE	3rd Officer	Bury	October 1942
MacAllister, J.	BEM	Deckhand	Noreen Mary	5 July 1944
MacDonald, A.	MBE	Refrig Engr	Empire Rowan	27 March 1943
MacDonald, D. A.	GM	Master	Blair Athol	12 February 1941
MacFadyen, N.	OBE	Master	Ocean Viceroy	29 March 1943
Mackay, A	MBE	Chief Engineer	Lady Connaught	27 December 1940
Mackie, J. H. A.	MBE, OBE	Chief Officer	Sydney Star	24 July 1941
Mackinlay, A.	OBE	Master	Loch Ranza	3 February 1942
MacLennan, G. J.	OBE	Chief Engineer	Strathallan	21 December 1942
MacLeod, N.	† C	AB	Michael E.	2 June 1941
MacNeil, D.	BEM	Quartermaster	Amsterdam	7 August 1944
Macphee, D.	C	AB	Norman Monarch	20 May 1941
Macquarrie, A.	MBE	3rd Engineer	Palma	31 October 1941
Magee, J. H.	† C	Senior Radio Officer	Port Brisbane	21 November 1940
Mair, A.	C	3rd Officer	Clan Macarthur	12 August 1943
Makepeace, N.	MBE	2nd Engineer	Toorak	16 January 1942
Mallett, J. R.	MBE	3rd Officer	Turakina	20 August 1940
Mangloo, F. H. X.	BEM	Genl Servant	Sutlej	26 February 1944
Manning, W.	BEM	Carpenter	Hatasu	2 October 1941
Marrs, W. L.	OBE	Chief Engineer	St. Essylt	4 July 1943
Marshall, C. S.	MBE	Senior Radio Officer	Baron Cochrane	28 December 1942
Mason, D. W.	GC	Master	Ohio	12 August 1942
Mastin, A. T.	MBE	Master	Devon Coast	2 December 1943
Matthews, R.	BEM	Apprentice	Port Victor	30 April 1943
Mayne, G. E.	C	Chief Officer	Ahamo	8 April 1941
McArthur, T.	BEM	3rd Hand	Rigoletto	29 January 1940
McCuaig, T. H.	OBE	Chief Engineer	British Fortitude	23 February 1943
McCutcheon, E.	MBE	3rd Engineer	Ocean Viceroy	29 March 1943
McDonald, T. F.	OBE	Master	Royal Star	20 April 1944
McEachran, S.	BEM	Chief Cook	Pacific Grove	23 September 1940
McGowan, C. K.	DSC	Master	Zaafaran	5 July 1942
McGowan, F. W. T.	GM	1st Radio Officer	Walmer Castle	21 September 1941
McGowan, L.	BEM	AB	Turakina	20 August 1940
McKechnie, J,	MBE	7th Engineer	California	11 July 1943
McLeay, A.	GM	Seaman	Thistlegorm	6 October 1941
McRuvie, D.T.	MBE	Skipper	Ben Screel	2 June 1941
Michaelsens, J.	C	1st Officer	Lubrafol	9 May 1942
Miller, E.C.	OBE	Chief Engineer	River Afton	5 July 1942
Miller, J. S.	MBE	Chief Officer	Hazelside	28 October 1941
Miller, Ms. A. N.	MBE	Ship's Surgeon	Britannia	25 March 1941
Miller, R. D.	† C	Master	Canadian Star	18 March 1943
Miller, S.	OBE	Chief Officer	San Florentino	1 October 1941
Mills, J.	OBE	Chief Engineer	Llangibby Castle	16 January 1942
Milton, J. A.	MBE	3rd Officer	Teesbank	5 December 1942
Mitchell, J. S.	† C	2nd Officer	Corbis	18 April 1943
Moffatt, W. N.	BEM	Boatswain	Copeland	17 May 1943
Moffitt, S. G.	OBE	Chief Engineer	Maja	15 January 1945
Moir, D. M.	MBE	5th Engineer	California	11 July 1943
Morgan, B.	OBE	Chief Engineer	Empire Starlight	3 April 1942
Morgan, G. B.	DSO	Master	Awatea	11 November 1942
Morgan, T. T.	BEM	Carpenter	Port Fairy	11 July 1943
Morris, D.B.J.	MBE	4th Engineer	Bhima	20 September 1940
Morris, O. C.	DSO	Master	Zamalek	5 July 1942
Moulton, E. W.	† C	Master	Arandora Star	2 July 1940
Movatne, B.	*OBE	Captain	Alaska	16 October 1942
Murray, W.	BEM	Chief Officer	Balfron	4 July 1941
Mussell, W.	BEM	Chief Engineman	Onward	10 April 1942
Myers, J, C.	C	Radio Officer	Jamaica Producer	31 October 1941
Nair, N. A.	MBE	2nd Radio Officer	Taksang	6 April 1942
Needham, P. W.	BEM	AB	San Florentino	1 October 1941
de Neumann, B. P.	GM	2nd Officer	Tewkesbury	1 March 1941
Newton, G. R.	BEM	2nd Steward	Corabella	30 April 1943
Nielsen, C.	*OBE	Master	Amerika	21 April 1943
Norcliffe, H. W. H.	MBE	1st Radio Officer	San Alvaro	23 February 1944
Nuttall, J.	MBE	3rd Engineer	Celtic Star	29 March 1943
O'Brien, D. J.	BEM	AB	Anchises	27 February 1941
O'Keefe, C. G.	† C	Radio Officer	Bassano	9 January 1941
O'Regan, J.	BEM	AB	Rio Bravo	2 November 1944
O'Sullivan, J.	C	Messroom Steward	British Colony	13 May 1942
Olin, K.	BEM	Boatswain	San Gerardo	31 March 1942
Olivant, C. H.	C	AB	Bennevis	7 September 1940
Ovenston, J. McG.	MBE	Chief Officer	Ferry Hill	21 January 1940
Owen, Miss E. M.	GM	Stewardess	St. Patrick	13 June 1941
Owens, E. W.	† C	Master	St. David	24 January 1944
Parfitt, L.	DSC	Master	Narkunda	14 November 1942
Pascoe, J.	OBE	Master	Bolton Castle	5 July 1942
Patterson, J.	BEM	AB	Black Osprey	18 February 1941
Patton, C.	OBE	Master	Ocean Faith	15 August 1943
Paulsen, O.	OBE	Master	Broompark	25 July 1942
Payne, R.T.	GM	Master	Marina	17 September 1940
Pearce, E.R.	OBE	Chief Officer	Avila Star	5 July 1942
Pearson, E.O.	MBE	2nd Officer	Ocean Courier	31 July 1944
Pedersen, E.O.	† C	Ships surgeon	California Star	4 March 1943
Percival, R. H.	BEM	AB	Goodwood	10 September 1939
Perrin, W. G.	OBE	Master	Dover Hill	4 April 1943
Peters, H. J. A.	OBE	Master	Alexia	9 August 1942
Peters, W. A.	C	AB	Newminster	25 July 1940
Phillips, H. R.	BEM	Apprentice	Empire Webster	7 February 1943
Phillips, R.	† C	3rd Radio Officer	Empire Byron	5 July 1942
Phipps, J. A.	BEM	Lamp Trimmer	Port Fairy	11 July 1943
Pinnington, D. S.	OBE	Chief Engineer	Athelcrown	22 January 1942
Pirie, M.	C	AB	San Alberto	9 December 1939
Plumb, Mrs. E.	BEM	1st Cl Stewdss	Rangitane	26 November 1940
Pointon, E. F. P.	MBE	3rd Officer	Benledi	5 April 1942
Pollard, C.	OBE	Chief Engineer	San Demetrio	5 November 1940
Prescott, W. C.	C – Received Lloyd's Medal, for Meritorious Service – Silver	Gunner RM	Terlings	21 July 1940
Preston, B.	C	Deckboy	Browning	12 November 1942
Purcell, F. J.	MBE	2nd Engineer	St. Patrick	13 June 1941
Purdie, D. G.	OBE	Chief Engineer	Derrymore	13 February 1942
Pybus, W.	BEM	2nd Engineer	Kingfisher	24 June 1940
Pycraft, P.J.	OBE, DSC	Master	Deucalion	12 August 1942
Quinn, C.	BEM	Fireman	Ocean Faith	15 August 1943
Radley, R.	C	Sailor	Scottish Standard	21 February 1941
Ransom, S.	† C	2nd Officer	Arandora Star	2 July 1940
Rawlins, C. G.	BEM	Fireman/Trimmer	Chandos	2 March 1942
Reed, C.	BEM	Boatswain	Port Fairy	11 July 1943
Reed, H. H.	GC †	Bdr/Gunner	Cormount	20 June 1941
Reeves, J. A.	AM	Chief Officer	Atheltemplar	14 September 1942
Reid, G. D. M.	† C	Chief Officer	Jura	9 February 1941
Reid, W.	OBE	Master	Alpera	22 May 1943
Renney, R.	† C	3rd Officer	Empire Light	7 March 1943
Renwick, T. J. L.	MBE	3rd Engineer	Empire Baffin	25 May 1942
Reynolds, A. C.	MBE	2nd Engineer	British Colony	13 May 1942
Rice, N.	OBE, CBE	Master	Orari	16 June 1941
Roberts, C. R. J.	OBE	Master	Kentucky	15 June 1942
Robinson, G. W.	OBE	Chief Officer	Carlton	20 December 1940
Robson, W.	C	AB	Empire Crusader	8 August 1940
Romijn, A.	*OBE	Master	Aagtekerk	14 June 1942
Rose, I. B.	MBE	2nd Officer	Empire Avocet	27 September 1942
Rose, N.	C	Gunner	Statira	3 August 1949
Ross, A.	MBE	2nd Officer	Kyle Castle	9 March 1945
Ross, J. A.	BEM	Apprentice	Benwyvis	20 March 1941
Rowlands, E.	MBE	2nd Officer	Induna	30 March 1942
Ruthven, J.M.	C	Ch Refrig Eng	Clan Macarthur	12 August 1943
Saalmans, H.R.	OBE	Master	Empire Bard	May 1942
Scurr, H.	MBE	2nd Officer	Sambridge	18 December 1943
Senst, J. N.	C	3rd Officer	Silvercedar	22 December 1940
Shahabuddin, K. S.	BEM	Cadet	Chilka	11 March 1942
Shaw, B.	BEM	Seaman	Kelmscott	9 February 1944
Shaw, H.	C	Asst Steward	Dunstan	6 April 1941
Shipton, J. N.	C	Master	Bennevis	7 September 1940
Shirley, P. J.	BEM	Donkeyman	Port Auckland	17 March 1943
Sibbald, R.	C	Steward	Newminster	25 July 1940
Simkins, T.	MBE	Radio Officer	Pinna	3 February 1942
Simpson, J.	MBE	§4th Engineer	Strathallan	21 December 1942
Simpson, T. E.	OBE	Chief Engineer	Corbis	18 April 1943
Small, E. A.	MBE	Chief Officer	Newminster	25 July 1940
Smith, B. H.	MBE	1st Radio Officer	Shahristan	29 July 1941
Smith, G. F.	OBE	Master	King John	13 July 1940
Smith, J. H. R.	OBE	Master	Botavon	3 May 1942
Smith, S. L.	C	Chief Officer	Kohinur	15 November 1940
Smith, T. G.	OBE	Master	Maclaren	3 December 1941
Smith, W. N. D.	MBE	Chief Officer	Ocean Faith	15 August 1943
Speed, H.	C	3rd Engineer	Athelduke	16 April 1945
Spence, T.	DSC	Chief Engineer	Dorset	13 August 1942
Stamp, H. T.	BEM	AB	Thelma	6 March 1944
Stankley, R. E.	OBE	Chief Engineer	Staffordshire	28 March 1942
Stein, W. H.	OBE	Master	Empire Starlight	3 April 1942
Stephen, J. R.	MBE, DSC	3rd Officer	San Arcadio	31 January 1942
Stewart, D. H.	C	Midshipman	Cyclops	11 January 1942
Stewart, R.	† C	Senior Radio Officer	California Star	4 March 1943
Stewart, R.J.	C	2nd Engineer	Silvercedar	22 December 1940
Stone, C. T.	OBE	Master	Starling	12 October 1940
Stormont, E.J.	MBE	Chief Officer	California	11 July 1943
Strang, S.	† C	Cadet	Corinaldo	29 October 1942
Stronach, G. P.	GC	Chief Officer	Ocean Voyager	19 March 1943
Stubbs, W.	C	Master	Doric Star	2 December 1939
Sturdy, E.	† C	Radio Officer	Denpark	12 May 1942
Styles, F. C. P.	MBE	Purser & Ch Stewd	Port Fairy	11 July 1943
Swales, J. K.	MBE	Ch Electrician	Port Fairy	11 July 1943
Swanney, J.	† C	Deckhand	Compaganus	17 December 1939
Swart, J.	*OBE	Master	Mijdrecht	7 March 1941
Symons, J. E. A.	C	Seaman Gunner	Satellite	25 September 1940
Tamlin, A. L.	C	Boatswain	Scottish Standard	21 February 1941
Taylor, G.	GM	2nd Officer	San Florentino	1 October 1941
Taylor, R. Y.	† C	Purser	Clan Macarthur	12 August 1943
Thomas, D.J.	MBE	Chief Engineer	Dapper	21 January 1942
Thomas, J.	BEM	Asst Steward	Royal Sovereign	9 December 1940
Thomas, M.W.	MBE	Master	Rio Bravo	2 November 1944
Thomas, W.P.	OBE	Master	Pinna	3 February 1942
Thomas, W. R.	OBE	Master	Starstone	31 October 1940
Thompson, H.	MBE	Chief Officer	Duffield	8 April 1941
Thomson, W. H.	GM	AB	Empire Purcell	27 May 1942
Thoresen, W.	*OBE	Master	Frontenac	27 October 1942
Thurston, H. C.	BEM	Apprentice	Cardita	31 December 1941
Toft, A.	*OBE	Master	Talabot	26 March 1942
Torgersen, A. O.	C	Chief Officer	Segundo	27 August 1941
Treves, F. W.	BEM	Cadet	Waimarama	13 August 1942
Trotter, J.	DSC	Chief Officer	Dorset	13 August 1942
Trundley, F.	GM	Asst Steward	Sussex	30 September 1940
Tuckett, J. C.	DSC	Master	Dorset	13 August 1942
Turner, G. L.	GM	2nd Engineer	Tewkesbury	1 March 1941
Turner, J. G. M.	EGM (later exchanged for the GC)	Radio Officer	Manaar	6 September 1939
Umpleby, T. A.	C	Donkeyman	Gasfire	21 June 1941
Ungr, E.	† C	Ship's Surgeon	Clan Macarthur	12 August 1943
Upton, V. G. A.	GM	2nd Officer	Start Point	10 November 1942
van der Veen, E. H.	C	Master	Leto	12 May 1942
Vick, E. E.	OBE	Chief Engineer	Duchess of York	11 July 1943
Vidot, C.	OBE	Master	San Demetrio	17 March 1942
Vogn, K. N.	C	2nd Officer	Dagmar	9 June 1941
Vooght, J. F.	OBE †	Master	Clan Campbell	23 March 1942
Walker, J. R.	BEM	Deck Mechanic	Rangitane	26 November 1940
Walker, W.	DSO	Master	Ocean Freedom	July 1942
Walker, W.	MBE	3rd Engineer	Rushpool	29 January 1941
Waller, T. E.	† C	Asst Cook	River Afton	5 July 1942
Ward, L. J. R. T.	OBE	Chief Engineer	Tulagi	27 March 1944
Wardman, E.	OBE	Chief Engineer	Empire Baffin	25 May 1942
Watson, G. G.	DSC	Chief Engineer	Empire Metal	2 January 1943
Watson, J. E.	OBE	Master	Eumaeus	14 January 1941
Watson, J. V.	† C	Chief Radio Officer	William Wilberforce	9 January 1943
Watson, N.	GM	3rd Officer	Pacific Grove	23 September 1940
Watt, A. V.	BEM	Apprentice	Earlston	5 July 1942
Webster, A. J.	BEM	Boatswain	Royal Sovereign	9 December 1940
Webster, J. F.	C	Master	Eurymedon	25 September 1940
Wharton, J.	MBE, DSC	Master	Empire Byron	5 July 1942
Wiggin, P. G.	MBE	Electrician	Silvermaple	26 February 1944
Williams, D.J.	OBE	Master	Anglo Canadian	6 April 1942
Wills Rust, V. P.	C	2nd Officer	Abukir	28 May 1940
Wilson, H.	† C	4th Engineer	Denpark	12 May 1942
Wilson, J.	OBE	Master	Leinster	14 November 1942
Wilson, J.F.	† C	Senior Radio Officer	Ocean Vagabond	10 January 1943
Wilson, W. D.	OBE	Master	Twickenham	15 July 1943
Windsor, P. G.	MBE	Radio Officer	Sultan Star	14 February 1940
Winslow, O. A.	*MBE	Chief Officer	Dagmar	9 June 1941
Woodhouse, J. B.	MBE	Chief Officer	Petrel	26 September 1941
Woolfenden, R. M.	MBE	Master	Abukir	28 May 1940
Wright, A. McN.	† C	Master	Eskwood	9 March 1945
Wright, R. H.	MBE	2nd Officer	Amsterdam	7 August 1944
Wright, T. O.	OBE	Master	Sheaf Field	28 October 1940
Wyatt, H. A.	† C	Boatswain	Rio Azul	29 June 1941
Young, J.	C	Seaman	San Alberto	9 December 1939
Young, S.	† C	Chief Officer	Empire Chaucer	17 October 1942
Youngson, W. M.	MBE	3rd Engineer	British Endeavour	22 February 1940
Zawada, Czesław	*OBE	Master	Narwik	10 October 1942

In the table the following abbreviations and annotations are used:

C – King's Commendation for Brave Conduct.

† – Posthumous, * – Honorary, § – Supernumerary, A/ – Acting, T/ – Temporary.

== Sources ==
- de Neumann, Bernard (19 January 2006). "Lloyd's War Medal for Bravery at Sea (Part One)". WW2 People's War. BBC.
- de Neumann, Bernard (19 January 2006). "Lloyd's War Medal for Bravery at Sea (Part Two)". WW2 People's War. BBC.

== See also ==
- Convoy rescue ship
- Merchant Navy
