= Brettenham =

Brettenham may refer to:

== Places ==
- Brettenham, Norfolk
- Brettenham, Suffolk

== Ships ==
- SS Brettenham, a Finnish cargo ship
