= French aviso Savorgnan de Brazza =

French Bougainville-class aviso

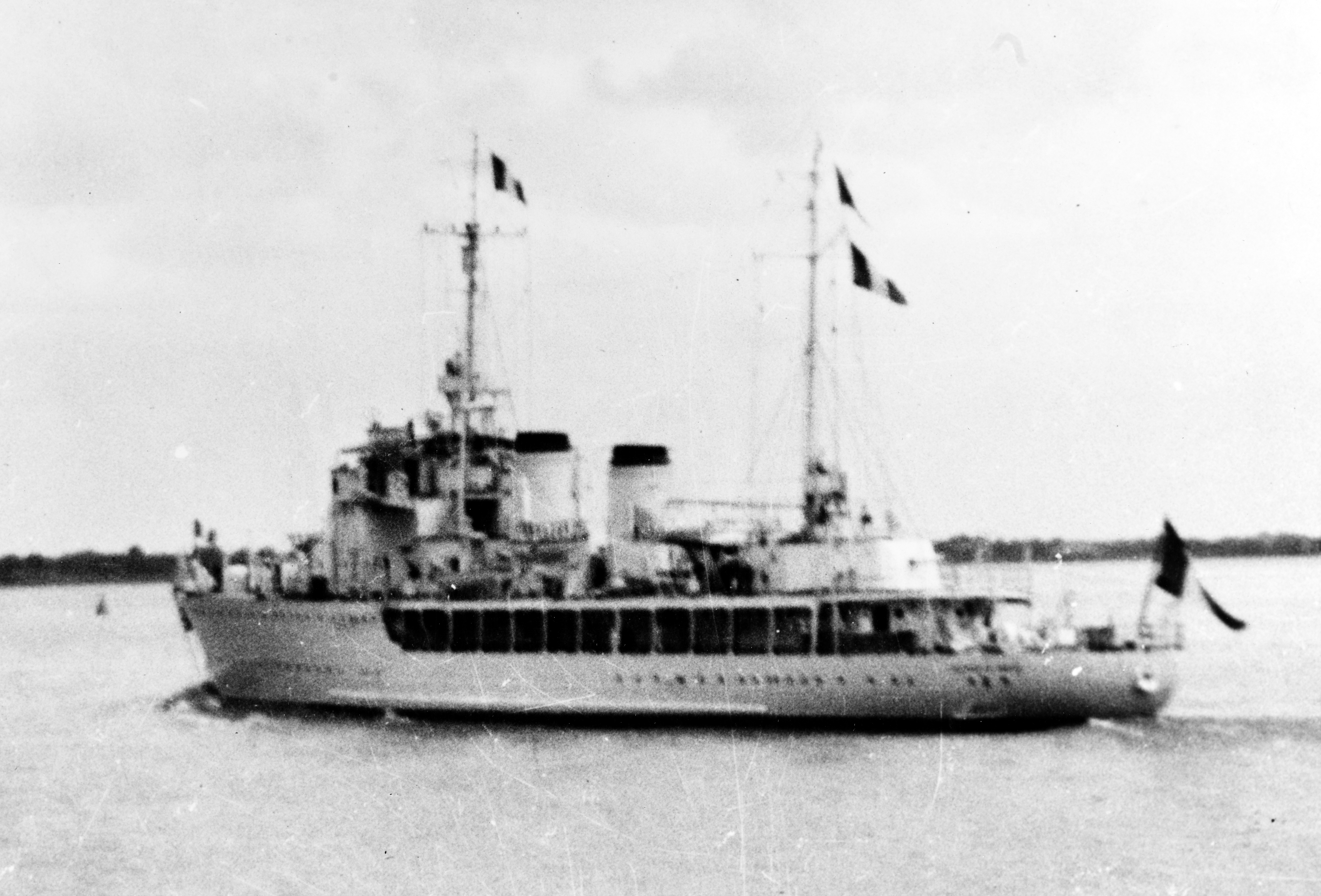
- Savorgnan de Brazza, c. 1937

History

France
- Name: Savorgnan de Brazza
- Namesake: Pierre Savorgnan de Brazza
- Ordered: 1929 Naval Estimates
- Builder: AC maritimes du Sud-Ouest, Bordeaux
- Laid down: 6 December 1929
- Launched: 18 June 1931
- In service: 21 February 1933
- Fate: Sold for scrap, 20 March 1957

General characteristics
- Type: Bougainville-class aviso
- Displacement: 1,969 t (1,938 long tons) (standard); 2,600 t (2,600 long tons) (full load)
- Length: 103.7 m (340 ft 3 in) (o/a)
- Beam: 12.7 m (41 ft 8 in)
- Draught: 4.15 m (13 ft 7 in)
- Installed power: 4,200 PS (3,100 kW; 4,100 bhp)
- Propulsion: 2 shafts; 2 diesel engines
- Speed: 15.5 knots (28.7 km/h; 17.8 mph)
- Range: 9,000 nmi (17,000 km; 10,000 mi) at 14 knots (26 km/h; 16 mph)
- Complement: 14 officers and 121 crewmen
- Armament: 3 × single 138.6 mm (5.5 in) guns; 4 × single 37 mm (1.5 in) AA guns; 4 × twin 8 mm (0.31 in) machine guns; 50 × mines
- Armour: Hull: 5–6 mm (0.20–0.24 in); Deck: 5–6 mm (0.20–0.24 in); Gun shields: 3 mm (0.1 in)
- Aircraft carried: 1 × Gourdou-Leseurre GL-832 HY floatplane

Savorgnan de Brazza was one of eight Bougainville-class avisos built for the French Navy (Marine Nationale) in the 1930s. Completed in 1933, she was assigned to the Far Eastern Naval Division (Division Navale de l'Extrême Orient) where she cruised amongst the islands of French Polynesia and the coast of French Indochina. The ship returned to France following the beginning of World War II in 1939 and played a minor role in the Dunkirk evacuation in May–June 1940 after the Germans invaded France. Savorgnan de Brazza sailed to Britain to avoid capture later in June.

The ship was seized by the British in early July and was transferred to the Free French the following month. During the Battle of Dakar in September, she carried the negotiators who unsuccessfully attempted to persuade the Vichy garrison to join the Free French and participated in a failed attempt to land troops outside Dakar. During the Battle of Gabon in November, Savorgnan de Brazza sank one of her sister ships whose crew had sided with Vichy France. The ship played a minor role in the East African Campaign, during which she blockaded French Somaliland for most of 1941. The aviso returned to Britain at the beginning of 1942 where she was refitted and was then briefly assigned convoy escort duties in early 1943. Savorgnan de Brazza shot down a German bomber in March and was then transferred to the Indian Ocean where she rescued the survivors of a torpedoed merchant ship in July. The ship was transferred to the South Pacific in 1944 and returned to France for another lengthy refit in 1945.

Savorgnan de Brazza was sent to Indochina in 1946 to reinforce French efforts to regain control of the territory and played a minor role in the opening stages of the First Indochina War. The ship would alternate service in Vietnam and in home waters for the rest of her career. She was taken out of service in December 1954 and was scrapped in 1957.

== Design and description ==
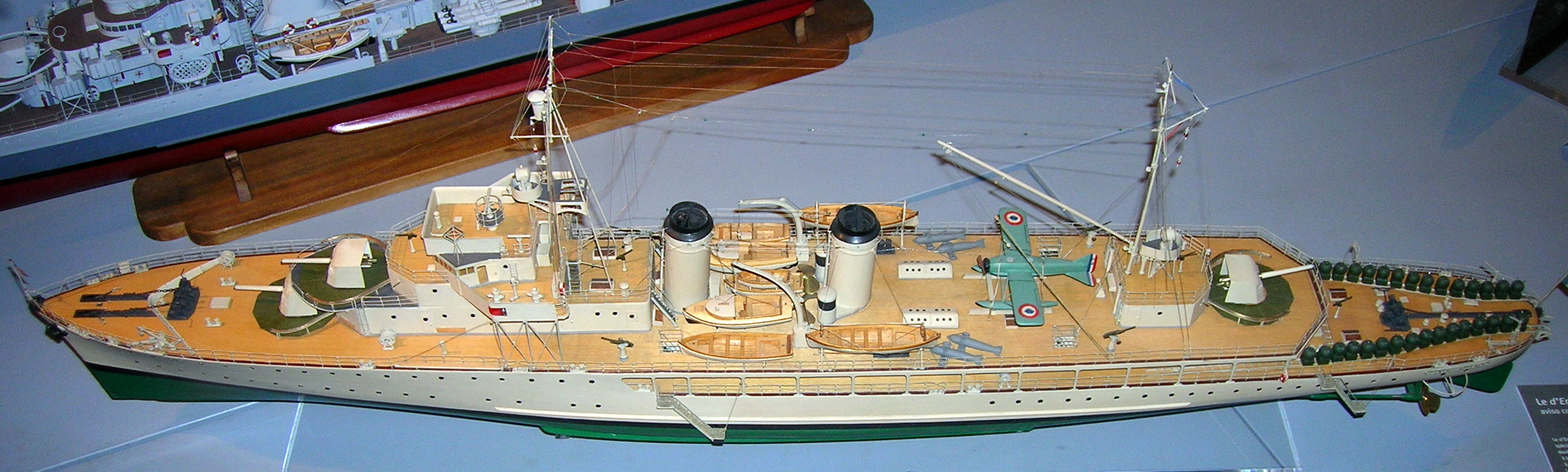
Model of sister ship D'Entrecasteaux at the Musée de la Marine de Paris

The Bougainville-class avisos were intended for service in the French colonial empire in austere conditions. They had an overall length of 103.7 metres (340 ft 3 in), a beam of 12.7 metres (41 ft 8 in), and a draught of 4.15 metres (13 ft 7 in). The ships displaced 1,969 tonnes (1,938 long tons) at standard load and 2,600 tonnes (2,600 long tons) at deep load. The superstructure, decks, and the upper plating of the hull was made from armor-steel plates 5–6 millimetres (0.20–0.24 in) thick to better resist small arms and machine gun bullets. Their crew consisted of 14 officers and 121 ratings in peacetime.

The Bougainville class was powered by a pair of license-built six-cylinder diesel engines, each driving one propeller shaft. Savorgnan de Brazza had Sulzer two-stroke engines rated at a total of 4,200 metric horsepower (3,089 kW; 4,143 bhp) for a designed speed of 15.5 knots (28.7 km/h; 17.8 mph). During her sea trials, Savorgnan de Brazza reached a speed of 18.3 knots (33.9 km/h; 21.1 mph). The ships carried enough diesel fuel to give them a range of 9,000 nautical miles (17,000 km; 10,000 mi) at 14 knots (26 km/h; 16 mph).

The Bougainville-class ships were armed with three 40-caliber Canon de 138.6-millimetre (5.46 in) Mle 1927 guns in single mounts, one superfiring pair forward of the superstructure and the third gun atop the aft superstructure. They were protected by 3 mm-thick (0.12 in) gun shields. The ships were fitted with a 3-metre (9 ft 10 in) Mle 1932 coincidence rangefinder on the roof of the bridge that fed data to the type aviso mechanical fire-control computer. The anti-aircraft armament of the Bougainville class consisted of four 50-caliber Canon de 37 mm (1.5 in) Mle 1925 AA guns in single mounts. Short-range protection against strafing aircraft was provided by eight Mitrailleuse de 8 mm (0.3 in) Mle 1914 in four twin mountings. The ships were fitted with mine rails, one set on each side of the aft superstructure to allow them to lay defensive minefields. They could carry 50 Breguet B4 mines or a smaller number of larger Harlé H4 mines. They were also fitted with four minesweeping paravanes on the quarterdeck. The minerails could also be used to drop depth charges over the stern via trolleys; a total of 16 depth charges could be loaded on the rails.

Between the mainmast and the aft funnel, space was reserved for a reconnaissance seaplane, either a Gourdou-Leseurre GL-832 HY floatplane or a Potez 452 flying boat. The aircraft was lifted onto the water and recovered back on board by a derrick attached to the mainmast.

== Construction and career ==
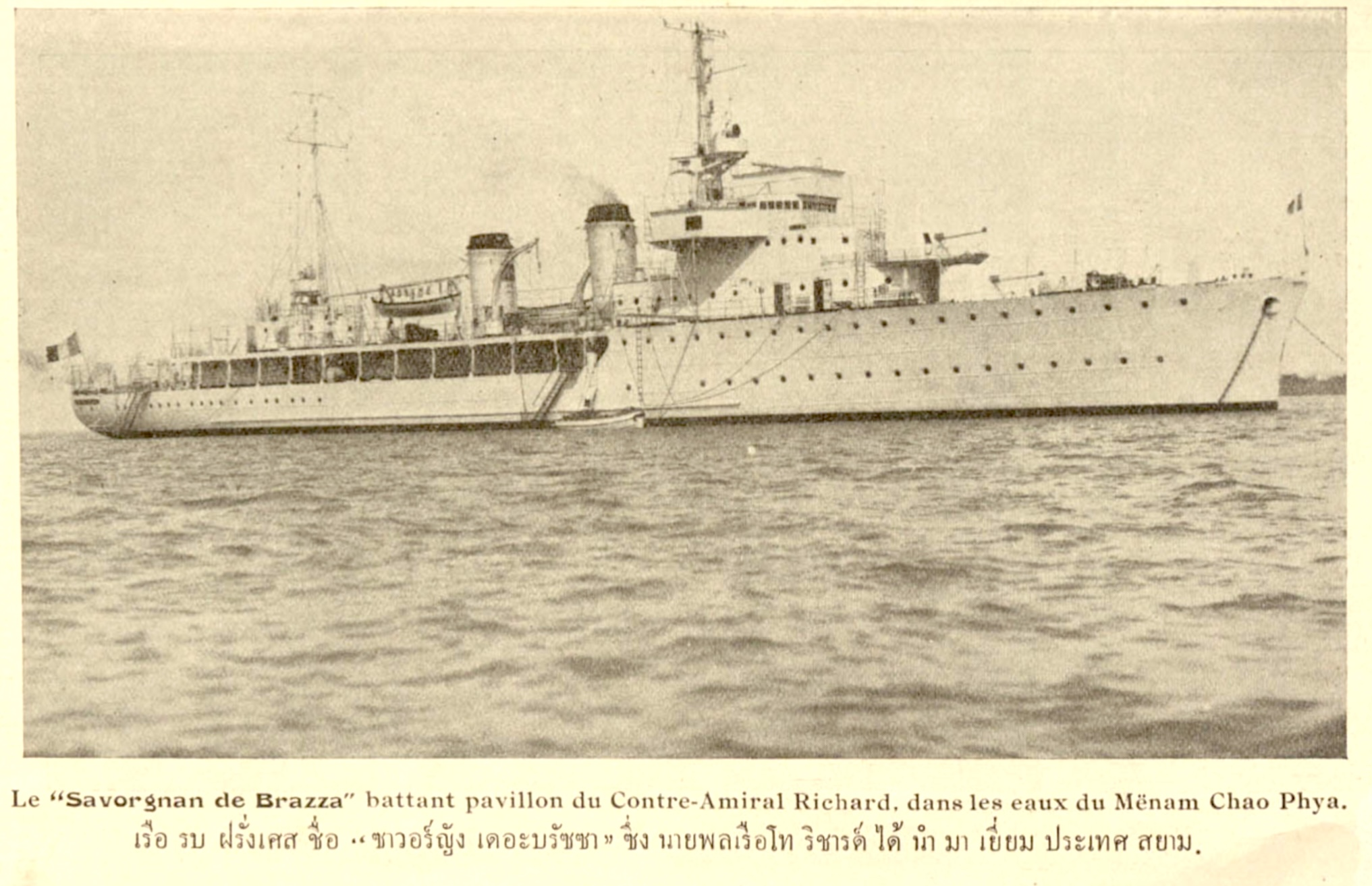
Savorgnan de Brazza in the Chao Phraya River, Bangkok, c. 1935

Savorgnan de Brazza, named after the French explorer, Pierre Savorgnan de Brazza, was authorized in the 1929 Naval Estimates. The ship was ordered from Ateliers et Chantiers Maritimes du Sud-Ouest and was laid down on 6 December 1929 at their Bordeaux shipyard. She was launched on 18 June 1931 and entered service on 21 February 1933. Savorgnan de Brazza arrived in Papeete, Tahiti, on 7 May and cruised through French Polynesia and visited the island of New Caledonia before moving on to Saigon, French Indochina. Later that year, she visited Hankou, China, and finally received her GL 832 at Saigon in October 1935. The ship was based in Nouméa, New Caledonia, from November to October 1936.

Savorgnan de Brazza remained in the Far East until a few months after the start of the Second World War in September 1939 when she departed on 19 December to begin a lengthy refit at La Pallice. It began on 14 February 1940 and involved the removal of the mainmast which was replaced by a platform with two additional twin mounts for 37 mm anti-aircraft guns and a pair of twin-gun mounts for the 8 mm Mle 1914 machine guns. The rangefinder was moved from the roof of the bridge to the aft end of this platform. Two 25-millimetre (1 in) Hotchkiss AA guns were added on the forward superstructure as were two twin-gun mounts for 13.2-millimetre (0.52 in) Mle 1929 machine guns. Another pair of twin-gun mounts for 8 mm Mle 1914 machine guns were fitted to the quarterdeck. The aft pair of paravanes was replaced by two smoke generators. The ship's anti-submarine capability was increased by the addition of four Thornycroft Mle 1918 depth-charge throwers on the quarterdeck, the installation of a rail for F28 depth charges above the stern and the replacement of the port mine rail by a rail capable of handling two 200-kilogram (440 lb) depth charges. The ship sailed to Cherbourg on 29 May to finish her refit which consisted of the addition of a 4-metre (13 ft 1 in) rangefinder on the bridge roof and the partial installation of a British Type 128A ASDIC.

After the completion of her refit, Savorgnan de Brazza became the flagship of Rear Admiral (Contre-amiral) Marcel Landriau, commander of the Pas de Calais Flotilla which was assigned to defend the English Channel. During the Dunkirk evacuation, the ship mostly spent her time berthed in Dover Harbour and providing anti-aircraft defence while Landriau was coordinating the evacuation with Vice-Admiral Bertram Ramsay, the British commander of the evacuation. The ship also ferried five troops from Dunkirk to Dover on 4 June. The German advance during the Battle of France, which threatened the harbours along the English Channel, caused the ship to depart Cherbourg for Britain on 18 June.

=== Free French service ===
On 3 July she was seized by the British at Plymouth as part of Operation Catapult and was commissioned on 17 July with a mixed British and French crew as only half her crew joined the Free French. Savorgnan de Brazza was turned over to the FNFL on 23 August and Lieutenant Commander (capitaine de corvette) André Roux assumed command. The ship was initially assigned convoy escort duties, but was soon ordered to support Operation Menace, the attempt to occupy Dakar in French West Africa.

On the morning of 23 September, she lowered two motor boats 4.8 kilometres (3 mi) off the western entrance to Dakar harbour. One boat was carrying a delegation led by the Free French Chief of Staff, Georges Thierry d'Argenlieu, in an attempt to negotiate a surrender and the other boat was occupied by a twelve-man security detachment. Flying white flags, the boats were refused permission to land and Landriau, commander of the cruiser squadron in port, ordered the arrest of d'Argenlieu. The motor boats hastily turned around and were engaged by a machine gun position on the jetty where they attempted to land, wounding d'Argenlieu. Savorgnan de Brazza approached the harbour entrance in an attempt to rescue the men, but was driven off by 100-millimetre (3.9 in) fire from the battleship Richelieu. Later that day, the ship attempted to land French troops at the small port town of Rufisque, some 20 kilometres (12 mi) south east of Dakar, in conjunction with two other avisos, but they were driven off by the port's defences.

She escorted a troop convoy from Freetown, British Sierra Leone, to Douala, French Cameroon, on 2–9 October. Savorgnan de Brazza received a brief refit there in which her ASDIC installation was completed, the pair of dual-gun mounts for 13.2 mm machine guns forward of the bridge were moved down to the forecastle deck and single mounts for 20-millimetre (0.8 in) Oerlikon guns were installed in their place. During the Battle of Libreville on 9 November, she sank her sister ship, Bougainville. The latter had opened fire first, but with one-third of her crew deployed as a landing party on the Ogooué River, her rate of fire was vastly inferior to that of Savorgnan de Brazza and the Free French ship set Bougainville on fire and sank her in twenty minutes with heavy loss of life.

Afterwards, Savorgnan de Brazza received a brief refit in Durban, Union of South Africa from 31 December 1940 to 9 January 1941. In March–April the ship helped to escort the troop ships carrying the Free French Orient Brigade (Brigade française libre d'orient) from Durban to Sudan to participate in the East African Campaign. Based at British Aden, she then spent most of the rest of the year patrolling the Red Sea as part of the blockade of Djibouti, French Somaliland. Savorgnan de Brazza also helped to support Allied operations in Italian Somaliland. While preparing to board a dhow bound for Djibouti on 27 July, the ship was unsuccessfully attacked by the Vichy submarine Vengeur.

==== 1942–1945 ====
Relieved by the aviso Commandant Dominé in January 1942, Savorgnan de Brazza departed Aden on the 11th for an overhaul at the Swan Hunter shipyard in Wallsend, Northumberland. The ship's anti-submarine weapons were replaced by their British equivalent to simplify her logistical requirements and she received the latest small-ship radars to improve her ability to find and sink submarines. A Type 271 surface-search radar was installed on the bridge roof and a Type 286 search radar was also fitted. The aviso was now equipped with two British depth-charge rails, each with space for a dozen depth charges, and four newer Thornycroft depth-charge throwers, each with a ready rack for three depth charges. The overhaul lasted until 12 November and Savorgnan de Brazza spent the rest of the year working up. Lieutenant Commander André Jubelin relieved Roux on 14 August.

Intensive anti-submarine training on 1–9 January 1943 and a few days escorting Convoy KMF 8 on 24–26 January in British waters revealed multiple mechanical defects which required more dockyard attention to rectify. The ship did not return to active service until 14 March when she began to escort Convoy KMS 11G from Greenock to Gibraltar. Five days later she shot down a Focke-Wulf Fw 200 Condor maritime patrol bomber from 2. Staffel, Kampfgeschwader 40, that attacked the aviso. After reaching Gibraltar, Savorgnan de Brazza escorted another convoy to Freetown, arriving there in April. Two months later, the ship set sail for the Indian Ocean, arriving at Tamatave, French Madagascar, on 7 July and then Le Port, Réunion, on 12 August. That same day the German submarine U-181 torpedoed and sank the British cargo ship Clan Macarthur in the Indian Ocean 350 nautical miles (650 km) east of Farafangana in Madagascar. Savorgnan de Brazza subsequently rescued 76 survivors and landed them at Port Louis, Mauritius.

On 30 January 1944 Jubelin left Savorgnan de Brazza and she was transferred to the South Pacific in March–April. The ship returned to France to begin a lengthy refit at La Ciotat that lasted from January to October 1945. The refit reinforced Savorgnan de Brazza's anti-aircraft armament. The number of 37 mm guns was increased to eight, three 25 mm and two 20 mm guns were added and the number of 13.2 mm guns was reduced to two.

=== Postwar activities ===
The ship was sent to help reassert French control of Indochina in 1946 and she bombarded the Vietnamese village of Kien An on 23 November during the Haiphong Incident, killing at least 300 people fleeing the fighting between the French and Vietnamese forces. Beginning in January 1947, Savorgnan de Brazza supported French operations in the vicinity of Da Nang. The ship departed Saigon on 29 April and arrived in Lorient on 13 June. She set sail for Vietnam on 16 February 1948. Savorgnan de Brazza would continue to alternate service in Vietnam with tours at home until her final departure from Saigon on 16 October 1953. She was disarmed in December 1954 and served as a pontoon at Toulon. Savorgnan de Brazza was sold for scrap on 20 March 1957.

== Bibliography ==
- Bertrand, Michel (1982). La Marine française au combat [The French Navy in Combat: Battles in the Atlantic with the Free French Naval Forces] (in French). Vol. 1: Des combats de l'Atlantique aux F.N.F.L. Paris: Charles-Lavauzelle. ISBN 2-7025-0002-1.
- Bertrand, Michel (1983). La Marine française au combat [The French Navy in Combat: From Scuttling to Victory] (in French). Vol. 2: Du sabotage à la victoire. Paris: Charles-Lavauzelle. ISBN 2-7025-0037-4.
- Goss, Chris (2017). Focke-Wulf Fw 200: The Condor at War 1939–1945. Manchester, UK: Crecy Publishing. ISBN 978-1-90653-754-8.
- Jordan, John (2016). "The Colonial Sloops of the Bougainville Class". Warship 2016. London: Conway. pp. 8–29. ISBN 978-1-84486-326-6.
- Jordan, John & Dumas, Robert (2009). French Battleships: 1922–1956. Annapolis, Maryland: Naval Institute Press. ISBN 978-1-59114-416-8.
- Le Masson, Henri (1969). The French Navy. Navies of the Second World War. Vol. 2. London: MacDonald & Co. ISBN 0-356-02385-0.
- Neville, Peter (2007). Britain in Vietnam: Prelude to Disaster, 1945–46. New York: Routledge. ISBN 978-0-415-35848-4.
- O'Reilly, Patrick (1974). Tahiti et l'aviation [Aviation in Tahiti] (in French). Société des Océanists. OCLC 1135339344.
- Roberts, John (1980). "France". In Chesneau, Roger (ed.). Conway's All the World's Fighting Ships 1922–1946. New York: Mayflower Books. pp. 255–279. ISBN 0-8317-0303-2.
- Roche, Jean-Michel (2005). Dictionnaire des bâtiments de la flotte de guerre française de Colbert à nos jours [Dictionary of French Warships from Colbert to Today] (in French). Vol. Tome II: 1870–2006. Toulon: Group Retozel-Maury Millau. ISBN 978-2-9525917-0-6.
- Rohwer, Jürgen (2005). Chronology of the War at Sea 1939–1945: The Naval History of World War Two (Third Revised ed.). Annapolis, Maryland: Naval Institute Press. ISBN 1-59114-119-2.
- Tennent, Alan J. (2001). British and Commonwealth Merchant Ship Losses to Axis Submarines 1939–1945. Stroud, UK: Sutton. ISBN 0-7509-2760-7.
- Winser, John de S. (1999). B.E.F. Ships Before, At and After Dunkirk. Gravesend, UK: World Ship Society. ISBN 0-905617-91-6.
