= SS Clan Macarthur =

British refrigerated cargo steamship

Coordinates: 23°00′S 53°07′E

History

United Kingdom
- Name: Clan Macarthur
- Namesake: Clan Arthur
- Owner: Clan Line Steamers, Ltd
- Operator: Cayzer, Irvine & Co
- Port of registry: Glasgow
- Builder: Greenock Dockyard Co, Scotland
- Yard number: 423
- Launched: 14 October 1935
- Completed: January 1936
- Identification: UK official number 164100; Call sign GYPG
- Fate: Sunk by torpedo, 12 August 1943

General characteristics
- Class & type: Cameron-class steamship
- Type: refrigerated cargo ship
- Tonnage: 10,528 GRT, 6,105 NRT
- Length: 477.1 ft (145.4 m)
- Beam: 66.2 ft (20.2 m)
- Draught: 30 ft 1 in (9.17 m)
- Depth: 40.2 ft (12.3 m)
- Installed power: 1,552 NHP
- Propulsion: 2 × 3-cylinder triple-expansion engines; 2 × low-pressure exhaust steam turbines; twin screw
- Speed: 14 knots (26 km/h)
- Capacity: 986,050 cubic feet (27,922 m^{3}) refrigerated cargo
- Sensors & processing systems: direction finding equipment; echo sounding device; gyrocompass
- Armament: DEMS
- Notes: sister ships: Clan Macaulay, Perthshire

SS Clan Macarthur was a British refrigerated cargo steamship. She was built for Cayzer, Irvine and Company's Clan Line Steamers Ltd as one of its Cameron-class steamships. She was launched in Greenock in 1936 and sunk in the Indian Ocean by enemy action in August 1943.

This was the third of three Clan Line ships to be named after Clan Arthur. The first was a 3,984 GRT ship built in 1883, sold to an Indian buyer in 1904 and renamed Shah Jehan. The second was a 7,382 GRT steamship built in 1912, transferred in 1920 to Scottish Shire Line and renamed Berwickshire, and sunk by torpedo in 1944.

== Building and peacetime service ==
In 1935–36 the Greenock Dockyard Company on the River Clyde at Greenock in Renfrewshire built three sister ships: two for Clan Line Steamers and one for Scottish Shire Line, which was closely associated with Clan Line. Clan Macarthur was launched on 14 October 1935 and completed in January 1936. Then Perthshire for Scottish Shire Line was launched on 26 March 1936 and completed in July. Finally Clan Macaulay was launched on 7 August 1936 and completed in November.

Clan Macarthur had capacity for 986,050 cubic feet (27,922 m^{3}) of refrigerated cargo. She had 24 corrugated furnaces with a combined grate area of 450 square feet (42 m^{2}) heating six single-ended boilers with a combined heating surface of 19,428 square feet (1,805 m^{2}) that supplied steam at 220 lb_{f}/in^{2} to a pair of three-cylinder triple-expansion steam engines, with steam exhausted from the low-pressure cylinders then driving a pair of low-pressure steam turbines. The North East Marine Engineering Co of Newcastle upon Tyne built her four engines, whose combined power was rated at 1,552 NHP.

== Wartime service ==
In January 1940 Clan Macarthur, laden with general cargo, sailed from Gibraltar to Liverpool with Convoy HG 14F. In February she sailed with Convoy OA 91, which formed off Southend-on-Sea and dispersed three days later.

On 10 September 1940 Clan Macarthur sailed from Liverpool with Convoy AP 3, which went via South Africa, left Durban on 11 October and reached Suez on 22 or 26 October.

On 4 December she left Suez with Convoy BS 10. The convoy dispersed on 11 December and she continued to Colombo, Ceylon.

In October 1941 Clan Macarthur, laden with refrigerated and general cargo, 985 tons of mail and two passengers joined Convoy HX 153 at Halifax, Nova Scotia. The convoy sailed on 5 October and reached Liverpool on 19 October.

In May 1942 Clan Macarthur joined Convoy WS 19 off Oversay, Renfrewshire. The convoy sailed on 10 May and reached Freetown, Sierra Leone on 22 May.

In May 1943 Clan Macarthur, laden with refrigerated and general cargo, joined Convoy HX 237 at Halifax, Nova Scotia. The convoy sailed on 1 May and reached Liverpool on 17 May.

== Final voyage and loss ==
Approximate position of Clan Macarthur's wreck

In June 1943 Clan Macarthur sailed from Glasgow for Port Louis, Mauritius laden with 6,346 tons of cargo including 5,500 tons of military stores, ammunition and mail. She had British officers, Muslim Lascar crew and a Czechoslovak ship's surgeon. She joined Convoy S 31, which left Liverpool on 20 June and reached Freetown, Sierra Leone on 4 July. Clan Macarthur continued to Durban, South Africa, where she joined Convoy DN 55, which left Durban on 6 August and dispersed in the Indian Ocean on 9 August.

Around noon on 11 August the German submarine U-181 started hunting her. Clan Macarthur was proceeding at full speed on a zigzag course, and it was not until the small hours of 12 August that the submarine managed to hit her. At 0332 hrs two G7a torpedoes hit Clan Macarthur's port side. One blew off her twin propellers and extinguished all her lights. The other hit her further forward, fracturing her foredeck across her beam. Many of her Lascar crew were trapped in their quarters.

Those of the crew who could reach boat stations were lowering her lifeboats when at 0347 hrs U-181 hit her with a third torpedo. It exploded forward of her bridge, causing her bow to settle in the water and her stern to rise at an acute angle, and at 0355 hrs she sank. As she did so there was a large underwater explosion that swamped several lifeboats and slightly damaged U-181. 52 crew and one DEMS gunner were killed.

The Free French aviso Savorgnan de Brazza rescued her Master (John Drayton Matthews), 70 crew and six passengers and landed them at Port Louis.

== Awards and monuments ==
Three survivors and three of the dead were honoured for their conduct. All six received the Lloyd's War Medal for Bravery at Sea:

- RF Cole, Chief Radio Officer
- CS Currie, Chief engineer (posthumous)
- A Mair, Third Officer
- JM Ruthven, Chief Refrigeration Engineer
- RY Taylor, Purser (posthumous)
- E Ungr, Ship's Surgeon (posthumous)

Cole was also awarded the MBE, and each of the other five was awarded the King's Commendation for Brave Conduct.

Members of Clan Macarthur's crew who were killed are commemorated in the Second World War section of the Merchant Navy War Memorial at Tower Hill in London. Her Lascar seamen are commemorated in the Commonwealth War Graves Commission monuments at Chittagong and Mumbai.

== Sources ==
- Slader, John (1988). The Red Duster at War. London: William Kimber & Co Ltd. p. 260. ISBN 0-7183-0679-1.
