= Donald Clarke (sailor) =

Recipient of the George Cross

Donald Owen Clarke GC
- Born: 5 March 1923; Chester-le-Street, Co. Durham
- Died: 9 August 1942 (aged 19) off Trinidad, Caribbean
- Awards: George Cross

Apprentice Donald Owen Clarke (5 March 1923 – 9 August 1942) of the Merchant Navy was posthumously awarded the George Cross for his heroism on 8 August 1942. Sailing alone, his motor tanker, the San Emiliano, was torpedoed and sunk by U.155 in the central Atlantic, south east of Trinidad. The ship was engulfed in flames but despite being so badly burned that he died the next day of his wounds, he helped save other severely burned victims by rowing a lifeboat clear of the stricken tanker. He rowed the lifeboat, the only one to survive the sinking, for two hours despite his hands being so badly burned they had to be cut away from the oars as his flesh had stuck to them. Lying at the bottom of the boat, as they waited for rescue, he sang to keep up the spirits of the other men.

Notice of his award appeared in the London Gazette of 20 July 1943. The citation ended thus "By his supreme effort, undertaken without thought of self and in spite of terrible agony, Apprentice Clarke ensured the safety of his comrades in the boat. His great heroism and selfless devotion were in keeping with the highest traditions of the Merchant Navy."

== Awards and decorations ==

1st row		George Cross	
2nd row	1939–1945 Star	Atlantic Star	War Medal 1939–1945 with King's Commendation for Brave Conduct

In addition to these decorations awarded by the British government, Clarke also received the Silver Medal of Liverpool Shipwreck and Humane Society, and the Lloyd's War Medal for Bravery at Sea.
