= SS Abukir =

Coordinates: 51°12′N 2°10′E

History
- Name: Island Queen (1920–34); Kyle Queen (1934–35); Abukir (1935–40)
- Namesake: Abu Qir, Egypt
- Owner: London and Channel Islands Steamship Co (1920–34); Monroe Bros, Liverpool (1934–35); Khedivial Mail Line (1935); HE Ahmed Abboud Pasha (1935–36); Pharaonic Mail Lines SAE (1936–40); Ministry of War Transport (1940)
- Operator: Cheesewright & Ford (1920–34); Lord Ernest Hamilton (1934–35); General Steam Navigation Co (1940)
- Port of registry: (United Kingdom) London (1920–34); (Kingdom of Egypt) Alexandria (1935–39); (United Kingdom) London (1940)
- Builder: Swan, Hunter & Wigham Richardson, Wallsend
- Yard number: 1159
- Launched: 27 September 1920
- Completed: November 1920
- Identification: UK official number 145082; code letters KHDL (1920–33); Call sign MKGT (1933–34); call sign SUCL (1934–40); call sign MCDN (1940)
- Fate: Sunk by torpedo, 28 May 1940

General characteristics
- Type: coaster
- Tonnage: 689 GRT, 355 NRT
- Length: 173.5 ft (52.9 m)
- Beam: 28.1 ft (8.6 m)
- Draught: 13 ft 5 in (4.09 m)
- Depth: 12.9 ft (3.9 m)
- Installed power: 97 IHP
- Propulsion: 3-cylinder triple-expansion steam engine; single screw
- Speed: 8 knots (15 km/h)
- Armament: (as DEMS) 1 Lewis gun
- Armour: concrete slabs to protect the bridge from machine-gun fire

SS Abukir was a British coastal steamship that was launched in 1920 as SS Island Queen and renamed in 1934 as SS Kyle Queen. In 1935 she was renamed Abukir and registered in Egypt. In May 1940 she was torpedoed and sunk in the North Sea while evacuating UK and Belgian soldiers, airmen and civilians from Ostend on the last day of the Battle of Belgium.

== Building and peacetime service ==
Swan, Hunter and Wigham Richardson built the ship at Wallsend on the River Tyne in north-east England, completing her in November 1920. She had three corrugated furnaces with a combined grate area of 58 square feet (5 m^{2}) that heated one single-ended boiler with a heating surface of 1,775 square feet (165 m^{2}). This fed steam at 180 lb_{f}/in^{2} to a three-cylinder triple expansion steam engine of 97 Rated Horsepower (RHP) that drove a single screw.

She was built as Island Queen for the London and Channel Islands Steamship Company, which appointed Cheesewright and Ford of London to manage her. In 1934 London and Channel Islands sold the ship to Monroe Brothers of Liverpool, who renamed her Kyle Queen. In 1935 Monroe Brothers sold her to the Khedivial Mail Steamship and Graving Dock Company of Alexandria, which operated ships and docks for the Kingdom of Egypt. The company, which traded as the Khedivial Mail Line (KML), renamed the ship Abukir after the coastal town of Abu Qir on the edge of the Nile Delta and registered her in Alexandria. In 1936 the company was reconstituted as the Pharaonic Mail Line, but continued trading as the KML.

On 22 March 1939 Abukir ran aground at Larnaca, Cyprus. She was refloated six days later.

== Requisition and voyage to Belgium ==
Although Egypt was supposedly independent, in practice the British Empire controlled the country. In 1940 the UK Ministry of War Transport requisitioned seven KML ships and placed five of them, including Abukir, under the management of the General Steam Navigation Company, a subsidiary of P&O.

On 10 May 1940 Germany invaded the Low Countries, overrunning Luxembourg within hours and the Netherlands within a week. The British Expeditionary Force (BEF) and French First Army advanced into Flanders to reinforce Belgian forces, and each sent a liaison mission to coordinate with the Belgian Grand Quartier Général ("High Command"). The British mission was named after its leader, the staff officer Major-General Henry Needham. Abukir was also sent to Belgium, where she arrived later in May at the Port of Ostend and unloaded a cargo of Army stores for the BEF.

However, German forces broke the French First Army, crossed the French frontier and on 20 May reached the Baie de Somme on the English Channel. This trapped the BEF and remaining French forces in northern Flanders, where they retreated toward Ostend, Nieuwpoort and Dunkirk. On 27 May Operation Dynamo began to evacuate the BEF by sea from Dunkirk. That afternoon at 1754 hrs the Needham Mission at the Belgian GQG reported that King Leopold III planned to negotiate a surrender to Germany. The Mission then retreated to the Port of Ostend, where Abukir was berthed. The Mission was among more than 200 BEF soldiers, RAF and Belgian Air Component personnel who crowded onto Abukir, along with 15 German prisoners of war, six priests, 40 to 50 women including a party of nuns from a convent in Bruges and a group of British schoolgirls. At 2220 hrs, under the cover of darkness, the little coaster sailed for England.

== Air and sea attacks ==
As Abukir slowly headed west for England, Luftwaffe aircraft bombed her for an hour and a half but failed to hit her. Then at 0115 hrs on 28 May a 44-knot (81 km/h) Kriegsmarine E-boat, S-34 commanded by OLt.z.S Obermaier, attacked her off Nieuwpoort near the Westhinder or the Noordhinder lightvessel. Abukir's Captain, Rowland Morris-Woolfenden, took a zigzag course by which the coaster avoided two torpedoes from S-34. The coaster sighted S-34 off her port bow 20 minutes later. Morris-Woolfenden changed course to ram the torpedo boat, but with a top speed of only 8 knots (15 km/h) Abukir was too slow. S-34 fired two more torpedoes. The first missed, but the second hit the coaster amidships, blowing her in two. Abukir burst into flames and sank within a minute. She was the first Allied ship to be sunk by an E-boat.

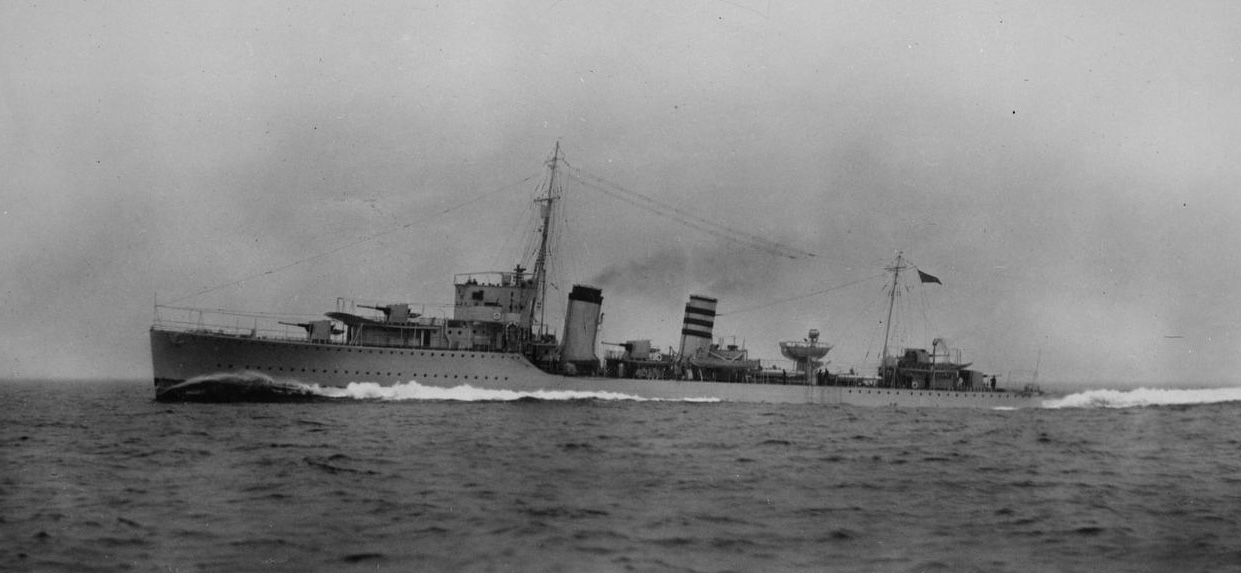
HMS Codrington rescued most of Abukir's survivors

Many of those aboard were killed in the impact and sinking, but S-34 then trained a searchlight on survivors in the water and machine-gunned them. Abukir's Second Officer, Temporary Sub-lieutenant Patrick Wills-Rust RNR, was on the bridge when Abukir was hit. Concrete slabs that had been installed to protect the bridge from machine-gun fire pinned him down and he went down with the ship. However, as the ship settled on the seabed the slabs were dislodged, freeing Wills-Rust and letting him return to the surface.

At first light five Royal Navy destroyers came to search for survivors: HMS Anthony Codrington, Grenade, Jaguar and Javelin. They spent several hours searching between the North Goodwin lightvessel and the Kwinte Bank lightbuoy but found only a small number of survivors (accounts vary between 26 and 33), including Captain Morris-Woolfenden, Sub-lieutenant Wills-Rust and two nuns. About 480 of the people aboard Abukir were killed. Based on P/O Ian James Muirhead letter from 5 June 1940: "Only 24 out of over 500 on board were saved and I was the only officer." There was F/Lt Ives among dead. Both were No. 151 Squadron members shot down near Ostend. Darlow, Steve: Five of the Few. London, Bounty Books 2011, p. 67. HMS Codrington rescued most of the survivors. They had been in the water for six hours.

== Awards ==
Recognising many acts of wartime courage by seafarers, in December 1940 Lloyd's of London announced a new award, the Lloyd's War Medal for Bravery at Sea. The first such medal awarded was to Captain Morris-Woolfenden, and the second was to Sub-lieutenant Wills-Rust. Morris-Woolfenden was also awarded the MBE.

Both officers survived the War and remained seafarers. In 1956 Morris-Woolfenden was still a captain with the KML. In 1941 Wills-Rust was promoted to Temporary Lieutenant (RNR). In the Merchant Navy he was promoted to first officer, served on tugs in the 1950s and 60s, and was a Master by the time he retired.

Approximate position of Abukir's wreck

== Monuments and wreck ==
Those killed include 14 of Abukir's crew, including the First Officer, L.J. Evans. They are named on one of the bronze panels in the Second World War part of the Merchant Navy Monument at Tower Hill, London. One Merchant Navy seaman, 17-year-old William Blair, is also listed on a bronze memorial plaque from the Prince of Wales Sea Training Hostel. The plaque is now in Holy Trinity parish church at Ingham, Norfolk, which is the village to which the Sea Training Hostel was evacuated in 1940 and where the plaque was originally unveiled in 1946.

BEF personnel who were killed aboard Abukir are named on panels of the Dunkirk Memorial in Dunkirk Town Cemetery. RAF and Belgian Air Component personnel who were killed aboard Abukir are named on panels of the Air Forces Memorial at Englefield Green in Surrey.

In 1969 a commercial diver found Abukir's wreck off the coast of Nord-Pas-de-Calais in northern France. Items found at the wreck site included plates, cups, teapots and cutlery initialled "KML" for the Khedivial Mail Line, Lee–Enfield .303 calibre rifle ammunition and rosary beads.

== Sources ==
- Brooke, Alan (2001). Danchev, Alex; Todman, Daniel (eds.). War Diaries 1939–1945. London: Weidenfeld & Nicolson. ISBN 0297607316.
- Gates, Eleanor M (1982). End of the Affair: The Collapse of the Anglo-French Alliance, 1939–40. London: George Allen & Unwin. ISBN 0049400630.
- Mariner, Ruth (August 2013). "Vere Patrick Wills-Rust, 1906–1975" (PDF). Selsey Life (178): 8–9. Archived from the original (PDF) on 20 December 2013.
