= Lloyd's Medal =

The Lloyd's Medal may refer to one of four separate awards bestowed by Lloyd's of London. The number of different medal types that have been awarded by Lloyd's is multiplied because there are variations within each of the four types:

- Lloyd's Medal for Saving Life at Sea – Beginning in 1836 Lloyd's of London began to issue medals for saving life at sea;
- Lloyd's Medal for Meritorious Service – this medal was introduced in 1893
- Lloyd's Medal for Services to Lloyds – this medal was introduced in 1913 for services to the firm.
- Lloyd's War Medal for Bravery at Sea – introduced in 1940

These awards are occasionally still bestowed.
