= SS Empire Byron =

World War II merchant ship of the United Kingdom

History
- Name: Empire Byron
- Owner: Ministry of War Transport
- Operator: Haldin & Philipps Ltd
- Port of registry: (United Kingdom) Sunderland
- Builder: Bartram & Sons Ltd, Sunderland
- Yard number: 289
- Launched: 6 October 1941
- Completed: January 1942
- Out of service: 5 July 1942
- Identification: UK Official Number 169005; Code Letters BCTG
- Fate: Torpedoed and sunk 5 July 1942

General characteristics
- Tonnage: 6,645 GRT; 4,796 NRT
- Length: 416 ft 8 in (127.00 m)
- Beam: 56 ft 5 in (17.20 m)
- Depth: 34 ft (10.36 m)
- Propulsion: 1 x triple expansion steam engine
- Crew: 49, plus 19 DEMS gunners

Location of the sinking of Empire Byron.

Empire Byron was a 6,645 GRT cargo ship which was built in 1941 for the Ministry of War Transport (MoWT). Completed in January 1942, she had a short service career. Empire Byron was torpedoed and sunk on 5 July 1942 by German submarine U-703 while a member of Convoy PQ 17.

== Description ==
Empire Byron was built by Bartram & Sons Ltd, Sunderland for the MoWT. She was yard number 289. Empire Byron was launched on 6 October 1941 and completed in January 1942.

The ship was 416 feet 8 inches (127.00 m) long, with a beam of 56 feet 5 inches (17.20 m) and a depth of 34 feet (10.36 m). She was propelled by a triple expansion steam engine which had cylinders of 23.5 inches (60 cm), 38 inches (97 cm) and 66 inches (170 cm) diameter by 48 inches (120 cm) stroke. The engine was built by North East Marine Engine Co (1938) Ltd, Newcastle upon Tyne. She had a GRT of 6,645 and a NRT of 4,796.

== Career ==
Empire Byron was operated under the management of Haldin & Philipps Ltd. She was a member of a number of convoys during the Second World War.

PQ 12

Convoy PQ 12 departed Reykjavík, Iceland on 1 March 1942. It arrived at Murmansk on 12 March. Empire Byron was a member of this convoy.

QP 9

Convoy QP 9 departed the Kola Inlet, Soviet Union on 21 March 1942 and arrived at Reykjavík on 3 April. Empire Byron was listed as a member of this convoy, with a destination of Immingham.

PQ 17

Convoy PQ 17 departed Reykjavík on 27 June 1942 and scattered at sea on 5 July. Empire Byron had started her voyage from Hull. She was carrying a cargo of 15 aircraft, 30 tanks, 2,455 tons of military stores and six vehicles. On 4 July, Empire Byron was hit by a torpedo dropped by a Heinkel He 111 of II/KG 26 and was damaged, straggling behind the convoy. at 08:27 (German time) on 5 July, German submarine U-703 fired another torpedo, which sank Empire Byron with the loss of six crew and a passenger at 76°18′N 33°30′E. A second passenger was taken prisoner. He was landed at Narvik, Norway on 15 July. The remaining 62 survivors were rescued by HMS Dianella and landed at Arkhangelsk on 16 July.

The ship's captain, John Wharton MBE, and the 3rd Radio Officer, R Phillips, were each awarded a Lloyd's War Medal for Bravery at Sea for their actions in the sinking of Empire Byron. In the case of Phillips, the award was posthumous. Those lost on Empire Byron are commemorated at the Tower Hill Memorial, London.

== Official Numbers and Code Letters ==
Official Numbers were a forerunner to IMO Numbers. Empire Byron had the United Kingdom Official Number 169005 and used the Code Letters BCTG.
