= Herbert Reed (British Army soldier) =

Henry Herbert Reed GC
- Born: 1911; Sunderland, England
- Died: 20 June 1941 (aged 30); The North Sea aboard SS Cormount
- Burial place: Bishopwearmouth Cemetery, Sunderland
- Military career
- Allegiance: United Kingdom
- Branch: British Army
- Service years: 1939-1941
- Rank: Bombardier
- Service number: 2052982
- Unit: Royal Artillery
- Conflicts: World War II †
- Awards: George Cross

Bombardier Henry Herbert Reed GC (1911 – 20 June 1941), of No. 2 Battalion, 1 Maritime Anti-Aircraft Regiment, Royal Artillery, was posthumously awarded the George Cross for the "gallant and utterly selfless action" he showed after the merchant ship SS Cormount was attacked by German E-boats and planes on 20 June 1941.

== 20 June 1941 ==
The ship was raked by machine-gun fire from the attacking planes, and Reed, who had volunteered to man anti-aircraft guns on merchant shipping, had suffered a mortal stomach wound. Despite his injuries, he rescued the injured Chief Officer from the badly damaged bridge and carried him down two sets of ladders to safety. He also managed to move an injured steward to cover before dying minutes later of his wounds. The ship survived the attack, despite being struck by an air-launched torpedo.

He was also posthumously awarded the Lloyd's War Medal for Bravery at Sea.

== George Cross citation ==
Reeds' George Cross citation appeared in The London Gazette on 23 September 1941:

The King has been graciously pleased to award the George Cross to: Henry Herbert Reed (deceased), Gunner.

The ship was attacked by enemy aircraft with cannon, machine‑guns and bombs. She replied at once with her defensive armament and the men at the guns went on firing despite the hail of bullets and cannon shell. Gunner Reed behaved with the utmost gallantry. He was badly wounded but when the Master asked how he was, he said that he would carry on. The Chief Officer was also badly wounded. Reed carried him from the bridge down two ladders to the deck below and placed him in shelter near a lifeboat. Gunner Reed then died. It was afterwards found that his stomach had been ripped open by machine‑gun bullets.

By his gallant and utterly selfless action Gunner Reed saved the life of the Chief Officer.

— London Gazette

Gunner Reed's George Cross is currently held by the National Army Museum in Chelsea, London.
