= Gordon Bastian =

British sailor

Gordon Love Bastion
- Born: 30 March 1902; Barry, Vale of Glamorgan
- Died: November 1987 (age 85)
- Military career
- Allegiance: United Kingdom
- Branch: Merchant Navy
- Rank: Second Engineer Officer
- Unit: SS Empire Bowman
- Conflicts: Second World War: Battle of the Atlantic; Convoy SL 126
- Awards: George Cross; Member of the Order of the British Empire; Lloyd's War Medal for Bravery at Sea

Gordon Love Bastian, GC, MBE (30 March 1902 – November 1987) was an engineering officer in the British Merchant Navy who was awarded the Albert Medal for risking his own life to save other members of the crew of SS Empire Bowman after it was torpedoed on 31 March 1943. In 1971, living recipients of the Albert Medal and Edward Medal were instructed to return their medal and were instead issued with the George Cross, the highest decoration for gallantry awarded to civilians or to military personnel for actions "not in the face of the enemy" in the United Kingdom and Commonwealth

== Early life and career ==
Bastian was born at Barry, Vale of Glamorgan in south Wales on 30 March 1902. In 1927, he first travelled to Canada. He joined the merchant navy and became an engineering officer. With the outbreak of the Second World War most British merchant shipping was organised into convoys, but German U-boats and surface raiders still inflicted considerable losses during the Battle of the Atlantic. Bastian was appointed Member of the Order of the British Empire for his convoy service on 1 January 1942.

By 12 March 1942, Bastian was second engineer officer on SS Empire Bowman, which was departing Freetown, Sierra Leone as part of Convoy SL 126, due to arrive in Liverpool at the beginning of April. On 30 March 1942 (coincidentally Bastian's 41st birthday), she was torpedoed by U-404 in the Atlantic Ocean some 425 nautical miles (787 km) north west of Cape Finisterre. At great personal risk, Bastian rescued two stokers from the sinking ship, for which he was awarded the Albert Medal (AM) on 17 August 1943, the citation read:

Ministry of War Transport, Berkeley Square, W.1. 17th August, 1943.

The KING has been graciously pleased to make the following award: —

The Albert Medal.

Gordon Love Bastian, Esq., M.B.E., Second Engineer Officer, Merchant Navy.

The ship in which Mr. Bastian was serving was torpedoed and sustained severe damage. Mr. Bastian was on watch in the engine-room when the ship was struck. He at once shut off the engines. He then remembered that two firemen were on watch in the stokehold. The engine‑room was in darkness and water was already pouring into it. Although there was grave risk of disastrous flooding in opening the watertight door between the stokehold and engine‑room, Mr. Bastian did not hesitate but groped his way to the door and opened it. The two firemen were swept into the engine-room with the inrush of water. One man had a broken arm and injured feet and the other was badly bruised and shaken. Mr. Bastian made efforts to hold them both but lost one, so he dragged the other to the escape ladder and helped him on deck. He then returned for the other and helped him to safety. The more seriously injured man had practically to be lifted up the ladder by Mr. Bastian, who was himself half choked by cordite fumes.

Second Engineer Officer Bastian took a very great risk in opening the watertight door into the already flooded and darkened engine-room of the sinking ship and both men undoubtedly owe their lives to his exceptional bravery, strength and presence of mind.

In 1944, Bastian was also awarded the Lloyd's War Medal for Bravery at Sea for his actions.

== Later life and legacy ==
Soon after receiving his AM, Bastian was invalided out of the Merchant Navy as a result of the damage caused to his lungs by the cordite smoke he inhaled during the rescue. In 1947, he settled in Canada, living in Montreal.

The high status of the Albert Medal was not generally understood by the public, and in 1971 Queen Elizabeth II instructed all living recipients to exchange their original medal for the George Cross (GC). The medal had been created by her father, King George VI, in 1940, in recognition of the hazards faced by the civilian population, and by merchant seamen such as Bastian. It was intended to have a similar status for civilian acts of gallantry, or for acts performed by members of the armed forces but which were not "in the face of the enemy", as the Victoria Cross does for acts of gallantry in combat. On its creation, holders of the Empire Gallantry Medal (EGM) were immediately instructed to exchange their medal for the GC, but holders of the AM and Edward Medal were not, despite these being higher in the order of wear than the EGM.

Bastian received his GC in a presentation made by the Governor-General of Canada, Roland Michener on 27 November 1973. He donated his Albert Medal to the National Museum Wales in 1973. He died in Canada in November 1987, survived by his wife, Mary, and a son and a daughter. Soon after the award of the AM, Bastian's portrait was painted by war artist Bernard Hailstone; the painting now forms part of the Government Art Collection. In 1990, a new road in his home town of Barry was named "Bastian Close" in his honour 51.415°N 3.252°W.
