= German submarine U-703 =

German World War II submarine

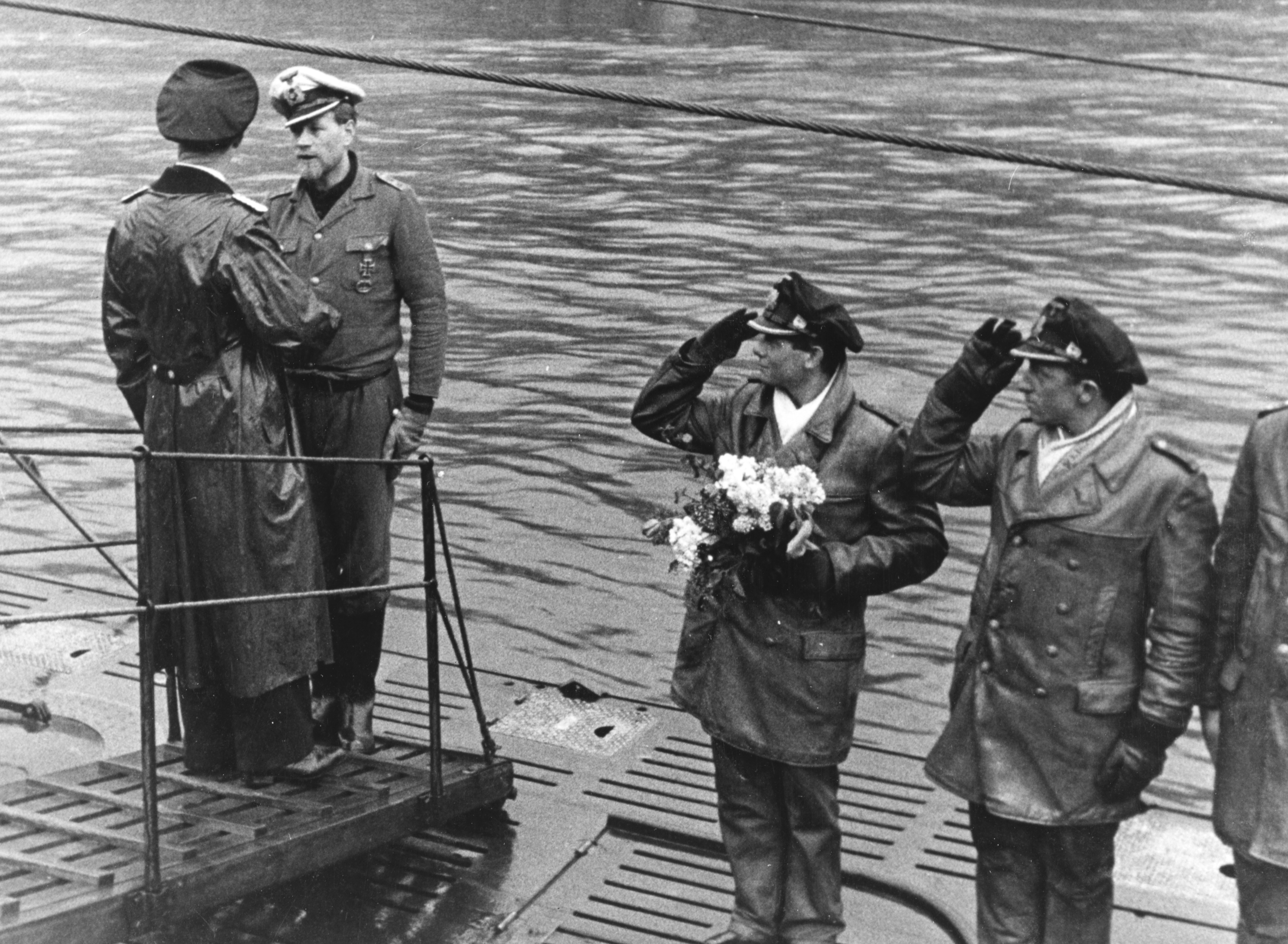
- Korvettenkapitän Hans Cohausz, Commander 11th U-Boat Flotilla, greets Kapitänleutnant Heinz Bielfeld, commander of U-703, on the submarine's gangway, at Bergen, Norway.

History

Nazi Germany
- Name: U-703
- Ordered: 9 October 1939
- Builder: HC Stülcken & Sohn, Hamburg
- Yard number: 762
- Laid down: 9 August 1940
- Launched: 18 July 1941
- Commissioned: 16 October 1941
- Fate: Missing since 16 September 1944

General characteristics
- Class & type: Type VIIC submarine
- Displacement: 769 tonnes (757 long tons) surfaced; 871 t (857 long tons) submerged
- Length: 67.10 m (220 ft 2 in) o/a; 50.50 m (165 ft 8 in) pressure hull
- Beam: 6.20 m (20 ft 4 in) o/a; 4.70 m (15 ft 5 in) pressure hull
- Height: 9.60 m (31 ft 6 in)
- Draught: 4.74 m (15 ft 7 in)
- Installed power: 2,800–3,200 PS (2,100–2,400 kW; 2,800–3,200 bhp) (diesels); 750 PS (550 kW; 740 shp) (electric)
- Propulsion: 2 shafts; 2 × diesel engines; 2 × electric motors
- Speed: 17.7 knots (32.8 km/h; 20.4 mph) surfaced; 7.6 knots (14.1 km/h; 8.7 mph) submerged
- Range: 8,500 nmi (15,700 km; 9,800 mi) at 10 knots (19 km/h; 12 mph) surfaced; 80 nmi (150 km; 92 mi) at 4 knots (7.4 km/h; 4.6 mph) submerged
- Test depth: 230 m (750 ft); Crush depth: 250–295 m (820–968 ft)
- Complement: 4 officers, 40–56 enlisted
- Armament: 5 × 53.3 cm (21 in) torpedo tubes (four bow, one stern); 14 × torpedoes; 1 × 8.8 cm (3.46 in) deck gun (220 rounds); 1 x 2 cm (0.79 in) C/30 AA gun

Service record
- Part of: 6th U-boat Flotilla; 16 October 1941 – 30 June 1942; 11th U-boat Flotilla; 1 July 1942 – 31 May 1943; 13th U-boat Flotilla; 1 June 1943 – 16 September 1944
- Identification codes: M 25 617
- Commanders: Oblt.z.S. / Kptlt. Heinz Bielfeld; 16 October 1941 – 5 July 1943; Oblt.z.S. Joachim Brümmer; 6 July 1943 – 16 September 1944
- Operations: 13 patrols: 1st patrol: a. 26 April – 7 May 1942; b. 10 – 13 May 1942; 2nd patrol: a. 16 – 30 May 1942; b. 1 – 4 June 1942; 3rd patrol: a. 29 June – 15 July 1942; b. 2 – 4 August 1942; 4th patrol: a. 9 August – 11 September 1942; b. 11 September 1942; 5th patrol: a. 14 – 26 September 1942; b. 28 – 30 September 1942; c. 28 – 31 December 1942; 6th patrol: 7 March – 5 April 1943; 7th patrol: a. 17 April – 15 May 1943; b. 18–19 May 1943; c. 19–21 May 1943; 8th patrol: a. 19 July – 3 August 1943; b. 14 – 16 August 1943; 9th patrol: a. 17 August – 9 October 1943; b. 10 October 1943; c. 12 – 14 October 1943; d. 18 – 19 October 1943; e. 13 – 17 January 1944; f. 24 – 28 February 1944; 10th patrol: 29 February – 8 March 1944; 11th patrol: a. 8 April – 5 May 1944; b. 29 July – 1 August 1944; 12th patrol: 20 August – 12 September 1944; 13th patrol: 16 September 1944
- Victories: 5 merchant ships sunk (29,523 GRT); 1 warship sunk (1,870 tons); 1 auxiliary warship sunk (559 GRT)

German submarine U-703 was a Type VIIC U-boat of Nazi Germany's Kriegsmarine deployed during the Second World War against allied shipping in the Arctic Ocean. She was a successful boat, which had a far longer service life than most other U-boats, primarily due to the restricted zone of operations in which she fought. Her main mission during the war was to target the Arctic Convoys which carried supplies to the Soviet Union from Britain. At this she was quite successful in her three years of raiding until her presumed demise in 1944.

U-703 was built at Hamburg in Northern Germany on the North Sea. She was completed in the autumn of 1941, and given to the experienced Kapitänleutnant Heinz Bielfeld to command. He took her on her working-up period in which the boat was tested and the crew trained in the Baltic Sea and around the German held coastlines, before being dispatched to Narvik in Norway for her first war patrol in April 1942.

== Design ==
German Type VIIC submarines were preceded by the shorter Type VIIB submarines. U-381 had a displacement of 769 tonnes (757 long tons) when at the surface and 871 tonnes (857 long tons) while submerged. She had a total length of 67.10 m (220 ft 2 in), a pressure hull length of 50.50 m (165 ft 8 in), a beam of 6.20 m (20 ft 4 in), a height of 9.60 m (31 ft 6 in), and a draught of 4.74 m (15 ft 7 in). The submarine was powered by two Germaniawerft F46 four-stroke, six-cylinder supercharged diesel engines producing a total of 2,800 to 3,200 metric horsepower (2,060 to 2,350 kW; 2,760 to 3,160 shp) for use while surfaced, two Garbe, Lahmeyer & Co. RP 137/c double-acting electric motors producing a total of 750 metric horsepower (550 kW; 740 shp) for use while submerged. She had two shafts and two 1.23 m (4 ft) propellers. The boat was capable of operating at depths of up to 230 metres (750 ft).

The submarine had a maximum surface speed of 17.7 knots (32.8 km/h; 20.4 mph) and a maximum submerged speed of 7.6 knots (14.1 km/h; 8.7 mph). When submerged, the boat could operate for 80 nautical miles (150 km; 92 mi) at 4 knots (7.4 km/h; 4.6 mph); when surfaced, she could travel 8,500 nautical miles (15,700 km; 9,800 mi) at 10 knots (19 km/h; 12 mph). U-702 was fitted with five 53.3 cm (21 in) torpedo tubes (four fitted at the bow and one at the stern), fourteen torpedoes, one 8.8 cm (3.46 in) SK C/35 naval gun, 220 rounds, and a 2 cm (0.79 in) C/30 anti-aircraft gun. The boat had a complement of between forty-four and sixty.

== Service history ==
Enjoying the improving Arctic weather, U-703 had an unsuccessful patrol in terms of victims, but the boat began to work better as a team, and the second patrol in May reaped dividends, with the sinking of the 6,191 GRT American freighter Syros. This ship sank with eleven lives after a torpedo touched off her ammunition. The same patrol scored greater success during the disastrous end to Convoy PQ 17 on the 5 May, when she managed to sink two lone cargo ships, one of them damaged by long range German bombers beforehand. Returning to port at Narvik, U-703 was cheered by her victory but she struggled to make further impressions during the year, as her next two patrols yielded only one victim, the British destroyer HMS Somali, which was fatally crippled by a torpedo near Convoy PQ 18 in September.

Following her lay-over in the winter as her home ports of Narvik, Trondheim, Hammerfest, Harstad and Bergen were all frozen, U-703 returned to the offensive, again attacking allied convoys in the Arctic Sea. Her first two patrols, in January and April were short and barren but on the next two in July and August 1943 under her new commander Joachim Brünner, she cruised in Soviet waters in the Barents Sea and further east, catching a small Soviet armed trawler on 1 August, and larger Soviet merchant ship the next day, sinking the Sergj Kirov near Istvestij Island. These patrols had shown the vulnerability of older U-boats to newer Allied countermeasures and protection, forcing the submarines to divert into backwaters of the Battle of the Atlantic to gain victories. U-703 continued operating in the spring of 1944, but she was obviously less efficient and was given duties deploying weather balloons in the Arctic Sea to test weather conditions for reports to other shipping. This was in part a result of terrible damage she received off Narvik during her first patrol of the season, when Allied aircraft strafed her, killing three crew and wounding three more. Just a few days before she had claimed her only victim of the year, the Empire Tourist, which was sunk whilst part of Convoy RA 57.

Relegated to her new duties, U-703 suddenly disappeared around the 16 September 1944. She had left Narvik on her thirteenth war patrol on 14 September, to deploy a weather balloon in the Arctic. At the time a heavy gale was running and it has been assumed that U-703 foundered due to heavy seas in the course of this difficult and highly technical operation. No trace of the boat and her 54 crew has been found.

== Summary of raiding history ==
Ships sunk (Note: Merchant ship tonnages are in gross register tons. Military vessels are listed by tons displacement.)
Date	Ship Name	Nationality	GRT	Notes
26 May 1942	Syros	United States	6,191	Sunk
5 July 1942	Empire Byron	United Kingdom	6,645	Sunk
5 July 1942	River Afton	United Kingdom	5,479	Sunk
20 September 1942	HMS Somali	Royal Navy	1,870	Sunk
30 July 1943	T-911	Soviet Navy	559	Sunk
1 October 1943	Sergej Kirov	Soviet Union	4,146	Sunk
4 March 1944	Empire Tourist	United Kingdom	7,062	Sunk

== Bibliography ==
- Gröner, Eric; Jung, Dieter; Maass, Martin (1991). German Warships 1815−1945: U-boats and Mine Warfare Vessels. Vol. II. Translated by Thomas, Keith; Magowan, Rachel. London: Conway Maritime Press. ISBN 0-85177-593-4.
