= BBC WW2 People's War =

Online WWII public archive published by the BBC

BBC WW2 People's War is an online public history archive of World War II memories collected and published by the BBC. The project took input from June 2003 to January 2006, with the final archive holding 47,000 written testimonies and 14,000 photographs from members of the public, intertwined around 144 events. Many were processed by volunteers, working in local public libraries and museums.
