= SS Empire Bowman =

World War II merchant ship of the United Kingdom

History
- Name: Empire Bowman
- Owner: Ministry of War Transport
- Operator: Hain Steamship Co Ltd
- Port of registry: (United Kingdom) Glasgow
- Builder: C Connell & Co Ltd, Scotstoun
- Yard number: 437
- Launched: 4 April 1942
- Completed: 25 May 1942
- Out of service: 30 March 1943
- Identification: UK Official number 168714; Code letters BDWN
- Fate: Sunk, 30 March 1943

General characteristics
- Tonnage: 7,030 GRT
- Length: 431 ft 3 in (131.45 m)
- Beam: 56 ft 3 in (17.15 m)
- Depth: 35 ft 2 in (10.72 m)
- Propulsion: 1 x triple expansion steam engine
- Crew: 44, plus 6 DEMS gunners

Location of the sinking of Empire Bowman.

Empire Bowman was a 7,030 GRT cargo ship built in 1942 for the Ministry of War Transport (MoWT). Completed in May 1942, she served until 30 March 1943 when she was torpedoed and sunk by U-404. One of her crew was awarded an Albert Medal for his actions in the sinking.

== Description ==
The ship was built by C Connell & Co Ltd, Scotstoun. She was yard number 437. Launched on 4 April 1942, she was completed on 25 May 1942.

The ship was 431 feet 3 inches (131.45 m) long, with a beam of 56 feet 3 inches (17.15 m) and a depth of 35 feet 2 inches (10.72 m). She was propelled by a triple expansion steam engine which had cylinders of 24 1/2 inches (62 cm), 39 inches (99 cm) and 70 inches (180 cm) bore by 48 inches (120 cm) stroke. The engine was built by Barclay, Curle & Co Ltd, Glasgow.

== Career ==
Empire Bowman's port of registry was Glasgow. She was operated under the management of Hain Steamship Co Ltd. Empire Bowman was a member of a number of convoys during the Second World War.

ON 99

Convoy ON 99 departed from Liverpool on 29 May 1942 and arrived at Boston on 12 June. Empire Bowman was in ballast for this voyage.

SL 126

Convoy SL 126 departed Freetown, Sierra Leone on 12 March 1943 and arrived at Liverpool on 1 April. Empire Bowman was on a voyage from Karachi, India to Hull via Mormugao, India; Durban, South Africa and Freetown. She was carrying a cargo which included 5,791 tons of general cargo and 2,500 tons of manganese ore. On 30 March, Empire Bowman was torpedoed by U-404 at 47°26′N 15°53′W, some 425 nautical miles (787 km) northwest of Cape Finisterre. The captain, 39 crewmembers and six DEMS gunners were rescued by HMS Wear and landed at Liverpool. Four crew were killed; they are commemorated on the Tower Hill Memorial. Her Second Engineer, Gordon Love Bastian, rescued two stokers from the sinking ships' flooded engine room at great personal risk. For this act, he was awarded the Albert Medal on 17 August 1943, the citation read:

Ministry of War Transport, Berkeley Square, W.1. 17th August, 1943.

The KING has been graciously pleased to make the following award: —

The Albert Medal.

Gordon Love Bastian, Esq., M.B.E., Second Engineer Officer, Merchant Navy.

The ship in which Mr. Bastian was serving was torpedoed and sustained severe damage. Mr. Bastian was on watch in the engine-room when the ship was struck. He at once shut off the engines. He then remembered that two firemen were on watch in the stokehold. The engine‑room was in darkness and water was already pouring into it. Although there was grave risk of disastrous flooding in opening the watertight door between the stokehold and engine‑room, Mr. Bastian did not hesitate but groped his way to the door and opened it. The two firemen were swept into the engine-room with the inrush of water. One man had a broken arm and injured feet and the other was badly bruised and shaken. Mr. Bastian made efforts to hold them both but lost one, so he dragged the other to the escape ladder and helped him on deck. He then returned for the other and helped him to safety. The more seriously injured man had practically to be lifted up the ladder by Mr. Bastian, who was himself half choked by cordite fumes.

Second Engineer Officer Bastian took a very great risk in opening the watertight door into the already flooded and darkened engine-room of the sinking ship and both men undoubtedly owe their lives to his exceptional bravery, strength and presence of mind.

In 1971, all living holders of the Albert Medal and the Edward Medal were instructed to exchange their medal for the George Cross. Bastian thus became a recipient of the highest civilian award for gallantry in the United Kingdom.

== Official Numbers and Code Letters ==
Official Numbers were a forerunner to IMO numbers. Empire Bowman had the UK official number 168714 and used the code letters BDWN.
