= French ship D'Entrecasteaux =

Six ships of the French Navy have borne the name D'Entrecasteaux in honour of Antoine Bruni d'Entrecasteaux:

== Ships ==
- D'Entrecasteaux (1858), a second-class aviso.
- D'Entrecasteaux (1899), a first-class protected cruiser.
- D'Entrecasteaux (1931) (1933), a Bougainville-class aviso.
- D'Entrecasteaux (1940), a hired ship of the FNFL.
- D'Entrecasteaux (1971), an oceanographic survey ship.
- D'Entrecasteaux (2015), the lead ship of the Bâtiment multi-mission class.
Ships of the French Navy named D'Entrecasteaux
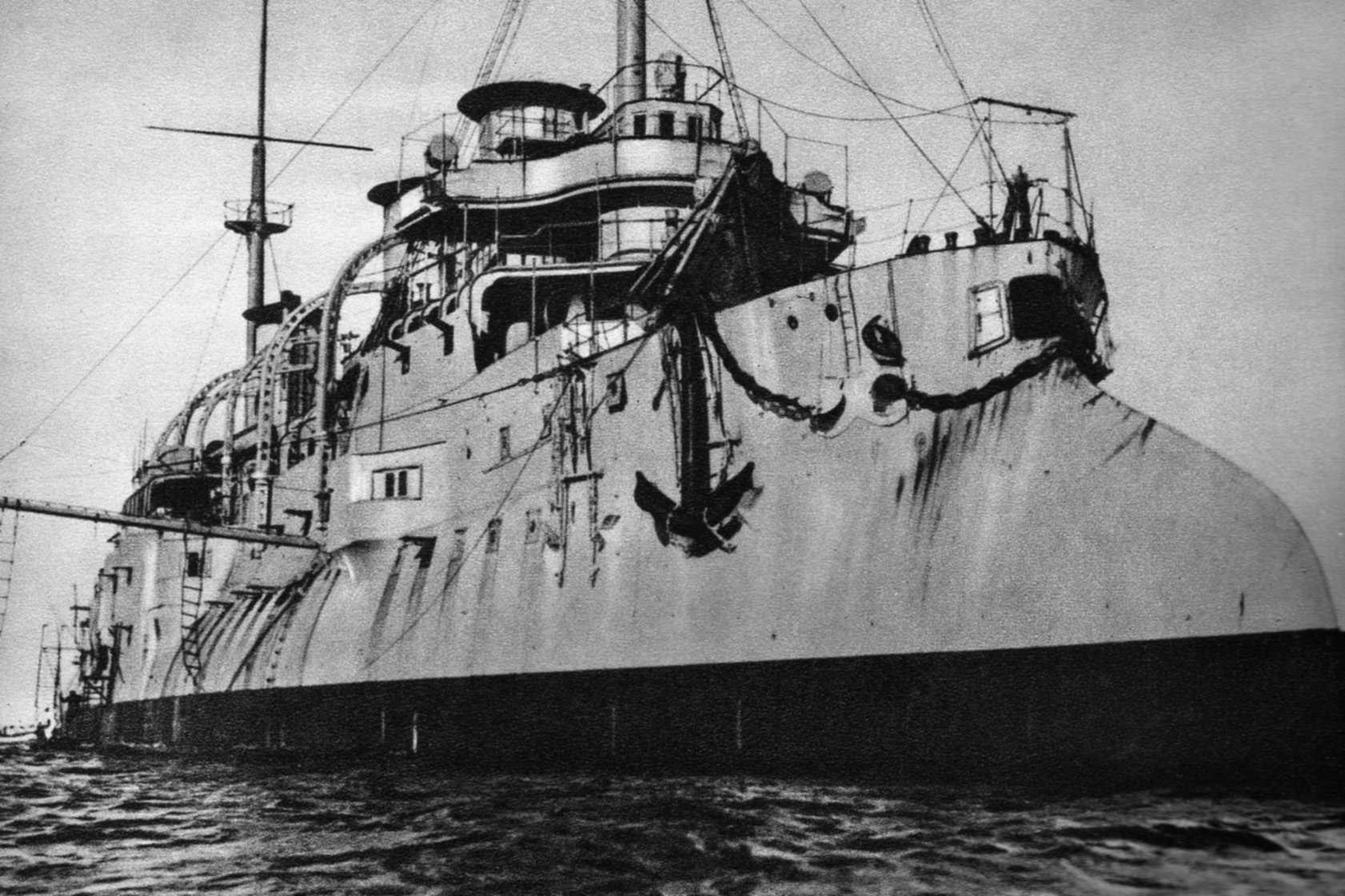
D'Entrecasteaux (1899).

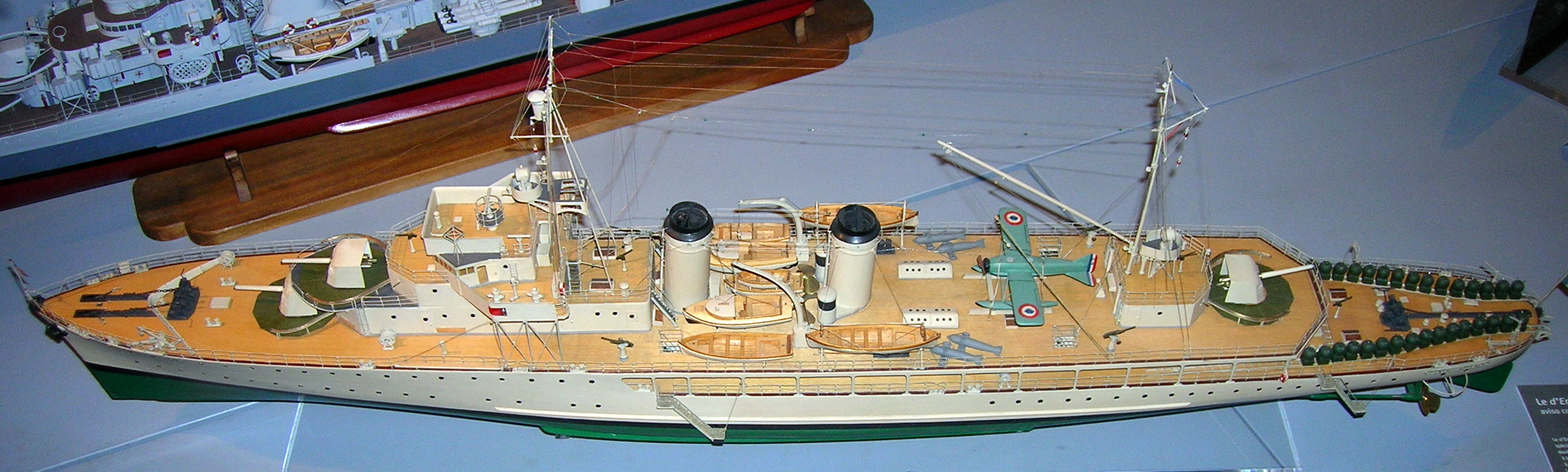
Model of D'Entrecasteaux (1931)

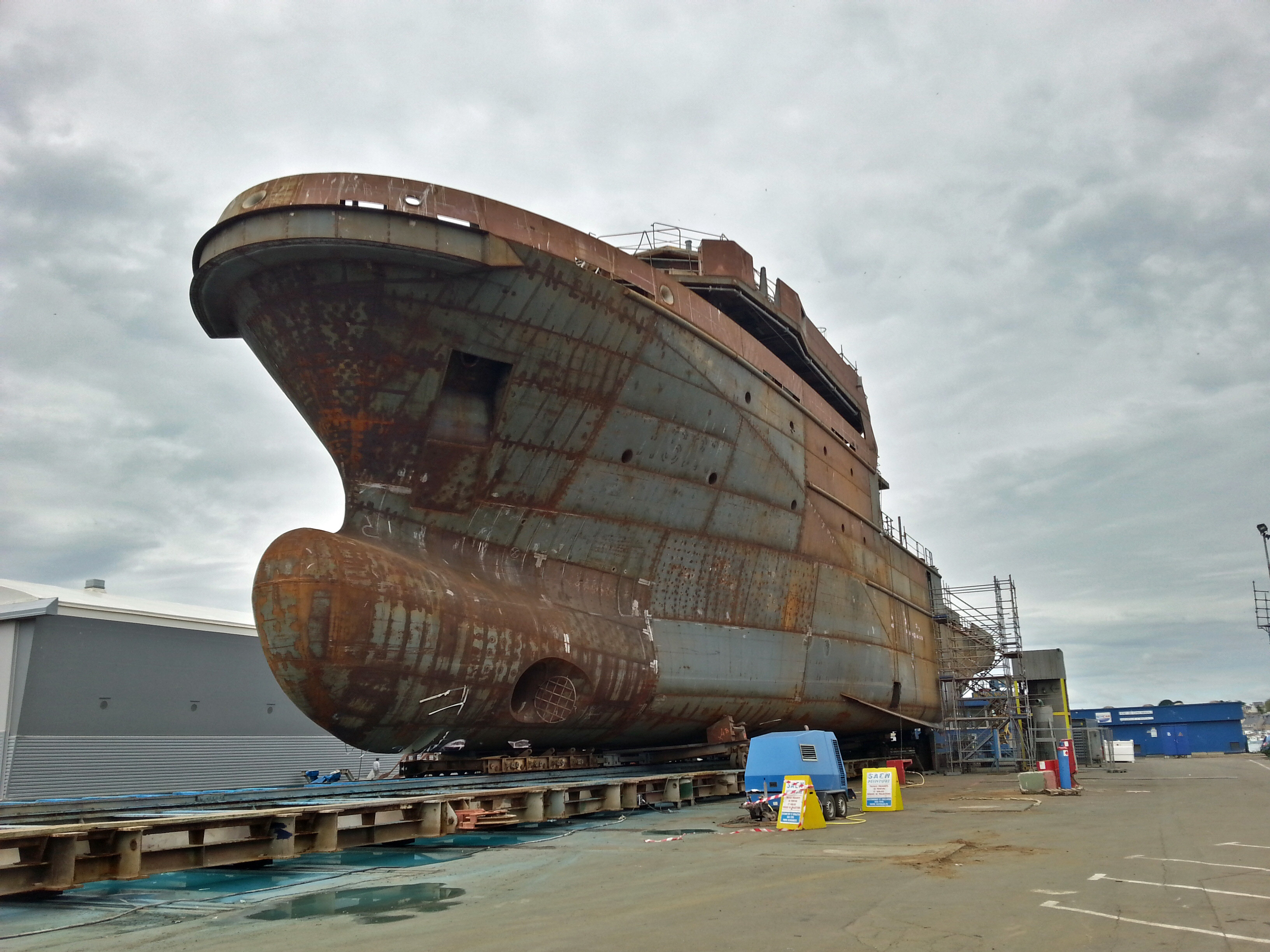
D'Entrecasteaux (2015)
