= SS Empire Bard =

World War II merchant ship of the United Kingdom

History
- Name: Empire Bard (1941–1946); Angusburn (1946–1955); Brettenham (1955–1971)
- Owner: Ministry of War Transport (1941–1946); Dundee, Perth & London Shipping Co Ltd (1946–1955); Rederei A/B Hildegaard (1955–1971)
- Operator: Dover Navigation Co Ltd (1942–1946); Dundee, Perth & London Shipping Co Ltd (1946–1955); F Lundqvist, Finland (1955–1971)
- Port of registry: (United Kingdom) Dundee (1942–1955); (Finland) Mariehamn (1955–1971)
- Builder: Caledon Shipbuilding & Engineering Co Ltd, Dundee
- Yard number: 396
- Launched: 30 December 1941
- Completed: March 1942
- Identification: UK Official Number 166213 (1941–1955); Code letters BDPK (1942–1946)
- Fate: Scrapped

General characteristics
- Tonnage: 3,114 GRT
- Length: 315 ft 5 in (96.14 m)
- Beam: 46 ft 6 in (14.17 m)
- Depth: 23 ft (7.01 m)
- Propulsion: 1 x triple expansion steam engine (North East Marine Engineering Co (1938) Ltd, Newcastle upon Tyne) 269 hp (201 kW)
- Speed: 8.5 knots (15.7 km/h)

Empire Bard was a 3,114 GRT heavy lift ship which was built in 1941 for the Ministry of War Transport (MoWT). She was sold in 1946 and renamed Angusburn and sold again in 1955 and renamed Brettenham. After a career lasting 29 years she was scrapped in 1971.

== History ==
Empire Bard was built by Caledon Shipbuilding & Engineering Co Ltd, Dundee as yard number 369. She was launched on 30 December 1941 and completed in March 1942. Empire Bard was built for the MoWT and operated under the management of Dover Navigation Co Ltd.

=== War service ===
Empire Bard was a member of a number of convoys during the Second World War. She spent the war years in service in Russia.

PQ 14

Convoy PQ 14, sailed from Oban on 26 March 1942 and arrived at Murmansk on 19 April. Empire Bard sailed from Loch Ewe on 27 March and arrived at Reykjavík on 31 March. She sailed from Hvalfjörður on 8 April and put into Akureyri on 13 April due to heavy pack ice and dense fog. She waited there until she was able to join Convoy PQ 15.

PQ 15

Convoy PQ 15, departed Oban on 10 April 1942 and arrived at Murmansk on 5 May. As noted above, Empire Bard joined the convoy at Akureyri.

RA 57

Convoy RA 57, departed the Kola Inlet on 2 March 1944 and arrived at Loch Ewe on 10 March. Empire Bard returned to Murmansk Empire Bard was judged to be capable of 8.5 knots (15.7 km/h) and the convoy's speed had to be reduced to accommodate this. She was supplied with the best coal available but on the morning of 5 March she was missing from the convoy. Empire Bard had put into Iokanka alleging steering trouble. She then sailed to the Kola Inlet, averaging 6 knots (11 km/h) with occasional bursts of 8 knots (15 km/h) when U-boats were reported in the area. Only two of the agreed four escorts accompanied her on this voyage.

RA 59A

Convoy RA 59A, departed the Kola Inlet on 28 August 1944 and arrived at Loch Ewe on 5 September.

=== Postwar ===
In 1946, Empire Bard was sold to Dundee, Perth & London Shipping Co Ltd, Dundee and renamed Angusburn. She was employed as general tramps, carrying various cargos such as timber from Arkhangelsk, iron ore from North Africa, sugar from Jamaica and esparto grass from Libya. Angusburn served until 1955 when she was sold to Rederei A/B Hildegaard Mariehamn and renamed Brettenham, operated under the management of F Lundqvist, Finland. She served with them for sixteen years. Brettenham arrived on 14 April 1971 at Cartagena, Spain for scrapping.

== Propulsion ==
She was propelled by a triple expansion steam engine which was built by North East Marine Engineering Company (1938) Ltd, Newcastle upon Tyne. She could make 8 knots (15 km/h).

== Official number and code letters ==
Official Numbers were a forerunner to IMO Numbers. Empire Bard had the UK Official Number 166213 and the Code Letters BDPK.
