= French destroyer Le Terrible =

French Le Fantasque-class destroyer

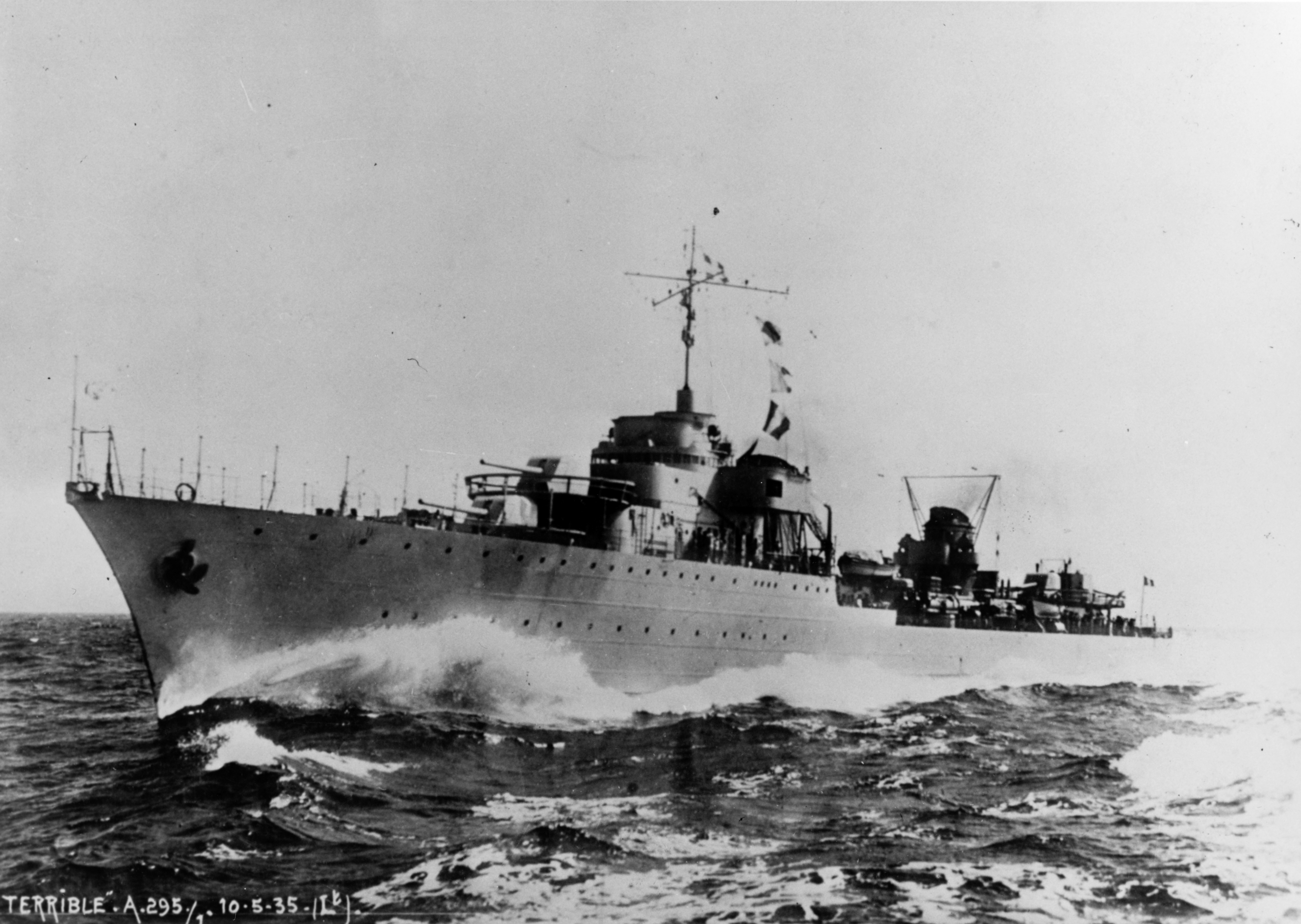
- Le Terrible on her sea trials, 10 May 1935

History

France
- Name: Le Terrible
- Namesake: ”the terrible one”
- Ordered: 20 June 1931
- Builder: Chantiers Navals Français, Blainville-sur-Orne; Ateliers et Chantiers de la Loire, Nantes
- Laid down: 8 December 1931
- Launched: 30 November 1933
- Completed: 1 October 1935
- Commissioned: 15 April 1935
- Decommissioned: 1 September 1955
- In service: 5 February 1936
- Reclassified: As a light cruiser, 28 September 1943; As a training ship, 1 September 1955
- Stricken: 29 June 1962
- Fate: Scrapped, 1963

General characteristics (as built)
- Class & type: Le Fantasque-class destroyer
- Displacement: 2,569 t (2,528 long tons) (standard); 3,417 t (3,363 long tons) (deep load)
- Length: 132.4 m (434 ft 5 in)
- Beam: 12 m (39 ft 4 in)
- Draft: 4.5 m (14 ft 9 in)
- Installed power: 4 water-tube boilers; 74,000 PS (54,000 kW; 73,000 shp)
- Propulsion: 2 shafts; 2 geared steam turbines
- Speed: 37 knots (69 km/h; 43 mph) (designed); 45.02 kn (83.38 km/h; 51.81 mph) (actual)
- Range: 2,700–2,900 nmi (5,000–5,400 km; 3,100–3,300 mi) at 15 knots (28 km/h; 17 mph)
- Complement: 11 officers, 254 sailors (wartime)
- Armament: 5 × single 138.6 mm (5.5 in) guns; 2 × single 37 mm (1.5 in) AA guns; 2 × twin 13.2 mm (0.52 in) AA machine guns; 3 × triple 550 mm (21.7 in) torpedo tubes; 2 × chutes for 28 depth charges; 40 × mines

Le Terrible ("The terrible one") was one of six Le Fantasque-class large destroyers (contre-torpilleur, "torpedo-boat destroyer") built for the Marine Nationale (French Navy) during the 1930s. The ship entered service in 1936 and participated in the Second World War. When war was declared in September 1939, all of the Le Fantasques were assigned to the Force de Raid, which was tasked to hunt down German commerce raiders and blockade runners. Le Terrible and two of her sister ships were based in Dakar, French West Africa, to patrol the Central Atlantic for several months in late 1939. They returned to Metropolitan France before the end of the year and were transferred to French Algeria in late April 1940 in case Italy decided to enter the war. She screened French cruisers once as they unsuccessfully hunted for Italian ships after Italy declared war in June.

Le Terrible was present when the British attacked French ships in July, but was not damaged. She was sent to Dakar at the beginning of 1941 and was there when French West Africa joined the Allies in late 1942. The ship was sent to the United States for repairs and to be modernized in early 1943. Le Terrible was sent to the Mediterranean at the beginning of 1944, where she spent the rest of the year searching for Axis shipping with two of her sisters. Between raids, the ship provided naval gunfire support during Operation Dragoon, the invasion of Southern France, in mid-1944. She was badly damaged in a collision in December and spent the next year under repair.

The ship was only intermittently active for the rest of the 1940s, but was modernized to serve as an escort for French aircraft carriers in 1952–1953. She was decommissioned in mid-1955, after which she briefly became a training ship and was reduced to reserve at the end of 1956. Le Terrible was stricken in 1962 and scrapped the following year.

== Design and description ==
The Le Fantasque-class ships were designed to counter the fast Italian Condottieri-class light cruisers and Le Terrible set a world record for a ship with a conventional hull of 45.02 knots (83.38 km/h; 51.81 mph). They had an overall length of 132.4 meters (434 ft 5 in), a beam of 12 m (39 ft 4 in), and a draft of 4.5 m (14 ft 9 in). The ships displaced 2,569 metric tons (2,528 long tons) at standard and 3,417 t (3,363 long tons) at deep load. Le Terrible was powered by two Rateau-Bretagne geared steam turbines, each driving one propeller shaft, using steam provided by four water-tube boilers. The turbines were designed to produce 74,000 metric horsepower (54,000 kW; 73,000 shp), which would propel the ship at 37 knots (69 km/h; 43 mph). During her sea trials on 22 January 1935, her turbines provided 90,868 PS (66,833 kW; 89,625 shp), and she reached 43.8 knots (81.1 km/h; 50.4 mph) for a single hour. The Parsons turbines were more economical than the Rateau-Bretagne turbines, which gave those ships equipped with them a range of 2,900 nautical miles (5,400 km; 3,300 mi) versus 2,700 nmi (5,000 km; 3,100 mi) at 15 knots (28 km/h; 17 mph). The crew of the Le Fantasque class consisted of 11 officers and 221 crewmen in peacetime and the number of the latter increased to 254 in wartime.

The main armament of the Le Fantasques consisted of five Canon de 138.6 mm (5.5 in) Modèle 1929 guns in single mounts, one superfiring pair fore and aft of the superstructure and the fifth gun abaft the aft funnel. Their antiaircraft (AA) armament consisted of two Canon de 37 mm (1.5 in) Modèle 1925 guns in single mounts positioned amidships and four Hotchkiss Mitrailleuse de 13.2 mm (0.52 in) CA Modèle 1929 in two twin-gun mounts aft of the 37 mm mounts. The ships carried three above-water triple sets of 550 mm (21.7 in) torpedo tubes; the aft mount could traverse to both sides, but the forward mounts were positioned one on each broadside. A pair of depth charge chutes was built into their stern; these housed a total of sixteen 200 kg (440 lb) depth charges with another dozen available in the torpedo magazine. They could also be fitted with rails capable of handling 40 naval mines.

=== Modifications 1938–1942 ===
In December 1938 – January 1939, the bridge wings were enlarged to accommodate the Hotchkiss machine guns on Le Terrible, Le Fantasque and L'Audacieux. After the war began, depth-charge stowage increased to 48 and a pair of rails was installed on the stern for 35 kg (77 lb) depth charges. Each rail could accommodate three depth charges and 15 more were stored in the magazine. In early 1940, twin-gun 37 mm mounts replaced the single-gun mounts and four Browning 13.2-millimeter AA machineguns on single mounts replaced the Hotchkiss machine guns in October–November. One pair was positioned on the bridge wings and the other pair was installed on the quarterdeck. In 1941–1942, the quarterdeck guns were transferred to new platforms on the center superstructure. Le Terrible had her aft superstructure remodeled in early 1942 to create a platform atop the aft ammunition hoists and platforms on each side for 37 mm guns. The twin-gun mounts were repositioned on the upper platform and one of the lower platforms, while the other one was occupied by a single mount as a shortage of twin-gun mounts existed. In May, the ship was provided with an Alpha-2 sonar system in cases pending the modification of the hull to accommodate the required flexible underwater dome.

== Construction and career ==
Ordered on 20 June 1931 as part of the 1930 Naval Program, Le Terrible's hull was laid down on 8 December 1931 by Chantiers Navals Français at its shipyard in Blainville-sur-Orne, and the hull was then towed to Ateliers et Chantiers de la Loire's Nantes shipyard for completion to help keep the former company in business. She was launched on 30 November 1933, commissioned on 15 April 1935, completed on 1 October, and entered into service on 5 February 1936. Completion was delayed when her turbines stripped some of their blades and required lengthy repairs. When the Le Fantasque ships entered service, they were assigned to the newly formed 8th and 10th Light Divisions (Divisions légère), which were later redesignated as scout divisions (Divisions de contre-torpilleurs); both divisions were assigned to the 2nd Light Squadron (2eme Escadre légère) in Brest. As of 1 October 1936, L'Indomptable, Le Triomphant and Le Malin were assigned to the 8th Light Division while Le Terrible, Le Fantasque, and L'Audacieux belonged to the 10th.

Albert Lebrun, President of France, inaugurated the new building of the Naval Academy (École Navale) in Brest and reviewed the 2nd Squadron on 30 May 1936, including L'Indomptable, L'Audacieux, Le Fantasque, and Le Terrible. Between 15 January and 26 February 1937, the 2nd Light Squadron cruised as far south as Conakry, French West Africa. On 27 May, Alphonse Gasnier-Duparc, Minister of the Navy, reviewed the fleet, including all of the Le Fantasque's.

=== World War II ===
Both the 8th and 10th Scout Divisions were assigned to the Force de Raid at Brest when war was declared in September 1939; the force made only a single sortie as a complete unit on 2–6 September, when it responded to an erroneous report that German ships had left port. Afterwards, it was dispersed into smaller groups to search for German commerce raiders and blockade runners. During 21–30 October, the Force de Raid, including all of the Le Fantasque ships, screened Convoy KJ 4 against a possible attack by the heavy cruiser Admiral Graf Spee. On 25 November, together with Le Fantasque and the heavy cruiser Dupleix, Le Terrible captured the 4,627-gross register ton (GRT) German merchantman SS Santa Fé. The ships of the 10th Scout Division escorted the Strasbourg and the British aircraft carrier Hermes as they searched for German ships in the Central Atlantic on 7–13 November. The division escorted Strasbourg and the heavy cruiser Algérie back to France on 18 November. The battleship Dunkerque sailed for Canada on 11 December with a cargo of gold, and she was escorted for the next two days by Le Terrible, Le Triomphant, Valmy, Mogador, and Volta.

In anticipation of an Italian declaration of war, the Force de Raid, including Le Terrible, assembled in Mers-el-Kébir, French Algeria, on 5–9 April, only to return to Brest when the Germans invaded Norway on the 10th. The ship returned to Mers-el-Kébir together with the bulk of the Force de Raid on 27 April. She took part in a sortie by the Force de Raid into the western Mediterranean on 12–13 June, after Italy declared war on the Allies on the 10th. Le Terrible was in Mers-el-Kébir when the British attacked the ships there, hoping to deny them to the Germans, on 3 July. She exited the harbor and engaged British destroyers as she escorted Strasbourg back to Toulon.

The Vichy French government established the High Sea Forces (Forces de haute mer (FHM)) on 25 September after it negotiated rules limiting the force's activities and numbers with the Italian and German Armistice Commissions. Le Terrible completed a refit in late 1940 and was assigned to the FHM on 25 December before sailing to Dakar on 11 February 1941 as a replacement for L'Audacieux, which had been crippled by the British during the Battle of Dakar the previous September. Le Terrible returned to Toulon for a refit that lasted from 31 December 1941 to 14 June 1942.

==== Free French operations ====
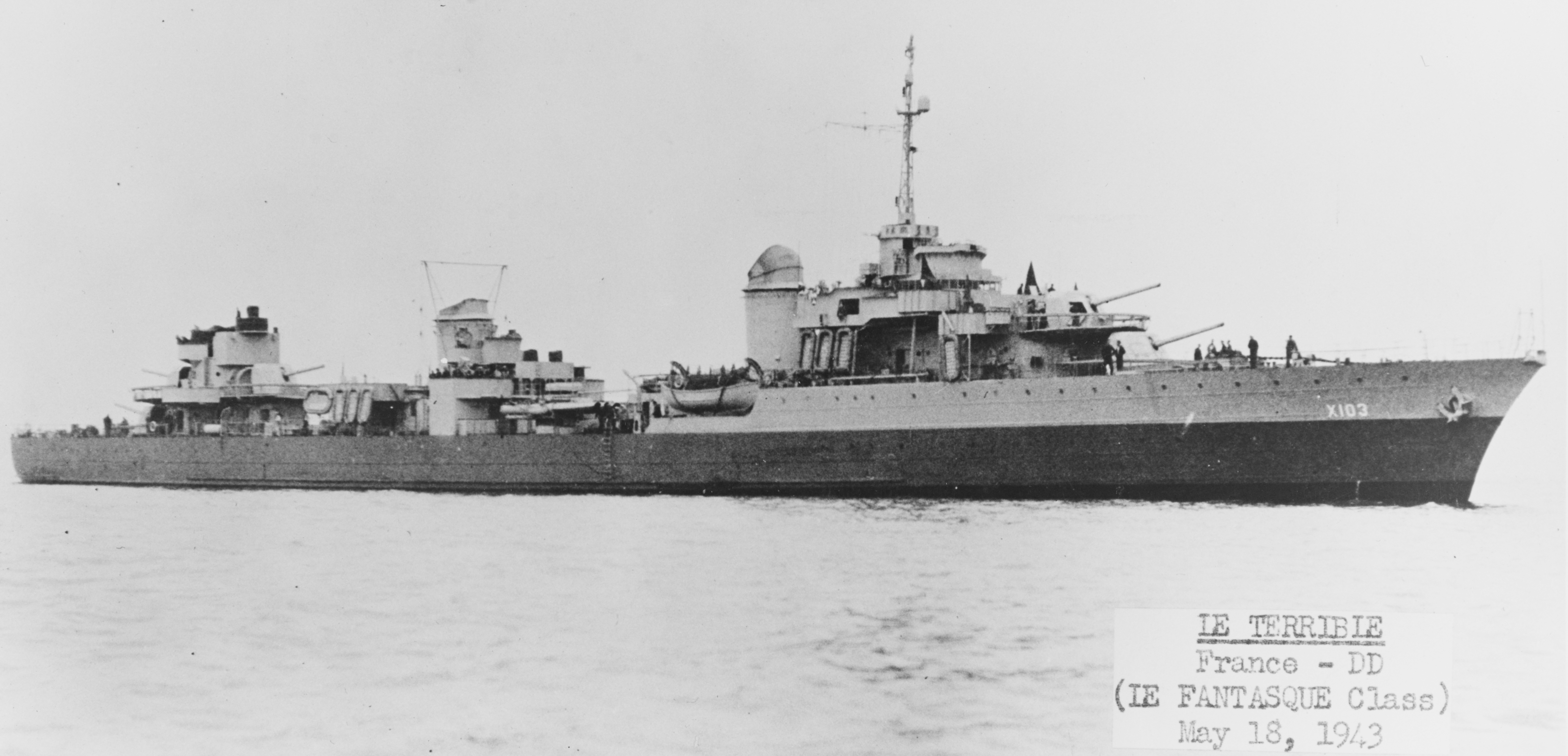
Le Terrible after her modernization in the U.S., 18 May 1943

After the Allies invaded French North Africa on 8 November, French West Africa and its fleet, including Le Terrible and her sister Le Fantasque, joined the Allies on 24 November. The sisters steamed to Casablanca, French Morocco, where their light AA guns were removed, on 21 January 1943 and then to the Charlestown Navy Yard in Boston to be modernized. Arriving on 21 February, Le Terrible's refit lasted until 22 May and included the addition of a license-built Alpha 128 ASDIC system, installation of SA early-warning and SF surface search radars, the removal of her aft torpedo tubes, and the conversion of some boiler feedwater tanks to fuel oil to improve her range. Her AA armament now consisted of eight 40 mm (1.6 in) Bofors guns in a quadruple mount superfiring over the aft 138.6 mm guns, and two twin mounts forward of the aft funnel; eight 20-millimeter (0.8 in) Oerlikon guns were also added in single mounts, four on the sides of the bridge and the remaining guns on platforms on the aft superstructure. These changes added about 410 tonnes (404 long tons) to the ship's displacement. After the refit, she was reclassified as a light cruiser and the 10th Scout Division was redesignated as the 10th Light Cruiser Division (LCD) (Division de croiseurs légers). Despite the modernization work in Boston, the ships' turbines were prone to frequent breakdowns during heavy use and required significant maintenance. To compensate, the French adopted a policy of keeping two of the three ships in the 10th Light Cruiser Division operational at any one time, while the third ship was repaired.

Le Terrible visited the islands of the French West Indies just after they joined the Free French in July 1943. She departed Martinique on 30 July and arrived in Dakar on 5 August before sailing to Algiers, French Algeria, where she arrived on 15 August. Together with Le Fantasque, she sortied in search of Axis shipping off Scalea, Italy, on 20–21 August, where the ships engaged Italian motor torpedo boats and then in the Bay of Naples on 21–22 August. The sisters were among the escorts for the British Force H during the Salerno landings (Operation Avalanche) on 9 September. As the Germans began evacuating Corsica on 10 September, the Allies began landing troops. On the night of 13/14 September, Le Terrible helped to land 500 troops at Ajaccio, along with 60 long tons (61 t) of supplies, after which the ship was immobilized with turbine problems. She was reclassified as a light cruiser on 28 September. On 17 October Le Fantasque and Le Terrible departed Oran, French Algeria, to meet with the battleship Richelieu at the Azores, and escorted her to Mers-el-Kébir. The following month, the sisters conducted two unsuccessful raids searching for German shipping in the Aegean Sea on 19–20 and 22–24 November in conjunction with the British light cruiser Neptune.

In late February, the 10th LCD was tasked to conduct deep raids in the Adriatic in search of German shipping. The raid on 27–28 was unsuccessful, but on the night of 18/19 March, Le Terrible and Le Fantasque encountered a German convoy and sank two Siebel ferries and damaged two other ferries. Both cruisers were struck by return fire that wounded eight men aboard Le Fantasque and one crewman on Le Terrible. The ships were refitted and then transferred to Alexandria, Egypt, to conduct patrols south of Crete and in the Aegean in April where they had no engagements. Transferred back to the Adriatic in June, Le Terrible and Le Fantasque sank the small oil tanker SS Giuliana on the 17th. On 15 August, the 10th LCD provided naval gunfire support during Operation Dragoon, the Allied landing in Provence, Le Terrible firing 158 shells from her main guns and then provided gunfire support for the troops advancing on Cannes. Together with Le Fantasque, Le Terrible escorted Richelieu to Toulon on 1 October. During night exercises in December, Le Terrible collided with Le Malin, severing the latter's bow and killed a total of 70 men between them. Le Terrible's hull was damaged for a length of 27 meters (89 ft) with four major holes that flooded the aft engine and boiler rooms.

=== Postwar activities ===
The ship was under repair at Bizerte, French Tunisia, until 1 January 1946. One of her 40 mm twin-gun mounts had been damaged beyond repair by the collision, and both mounts were replaced by single guns protected by gun shields. She returned to Toulon on 26 April and then, together with Le Malin, Le Terrible made a show-the-flag cruise to Northern Europe in May. On 1 January 1947, the 10th LCD was combined with the 4th Division of Cruisers into the Cruiser Group; during this time, only two of the four surviving ships of the class were active at any one time because of a shortage of trained personnel. Le Terrible was active in 1947 and 1948 before being decommissioned on 12 July. She was transferred to Bizerte on 27 April 1949 and placed in reserve there on 15 March 1950. All of the Le Fantasque-class ships were reclassified as escort destroyers, 1st class (destroyer-escorteurs de 1^{re} classe) on 1 July 1951 and then as fast escorts (escorteur rapide) in 1953. Le Terrible was refitted from 1 May 1952 to early April 1953 to serve as an escort for French aircraft carriers and made a cruise to the Eastern Mediterranean in May–June before beginning to escort the carrier La Fayette later in June. Bois Belleau replaced her from February to August 1954, and the destroyer escorted La Fayette again from September 1954 to February 1955 before switching to Arromanches until August. Le Terrible arrived in Brest on 28 August, where she was decommissioned on 1 September and was used as a stationary training ship for the Naval Academy. She was placed in special reserve on 1 December 1956, stricken from the Navy List on 29 June 1962, and scrapped in 1963.

== Bibliography ==
- Jordan, John & Dumas, Robert (2009). French Battleships 1922–1956. Barnsley, UK: Seaforth Punblishing. ISBN 978-1-84832-034-5.
- Jordan, John & Moulin, Jean (2013). French Cruisers, 1922−1956. Barnsley, UK: Seaforth Publishing. ISBN 978-1-84832-133-5.
- Jordan, John & Moulin, Jean (2015). French Destroyers: Torpilleurs d'Escadre & Contre-Torpilleurs 1922–1956. Barnsley, UK: Seaforth Publishing. ISBN 978-1-84832-198-4.
- Roberts, John (1980). "France". In Chesneau, Roger (ed.). Conway's All the World's Fighting Ships 1922–1946. New York: Mayflower Books. pp. 255–279. ISBN 0-8317-0303-2.
- Rohwer, Jürgen (2005). Chronology of the War at Sea 1939–1945: The Naval History of World War Two (Third Revised ed.). Annapolis, Maryland: Naval Institute Press. ISBN 1-59114-119-2.
- Whitley, M. J. (1988). Destroyers of World War Two: An International Encyclopedia. Annapolis, Maryland: Naval Institute Press. ISBN 0-87021-326-1.
