= French destroyer Le Triomphant =

French Le Fantasque-class destroyer

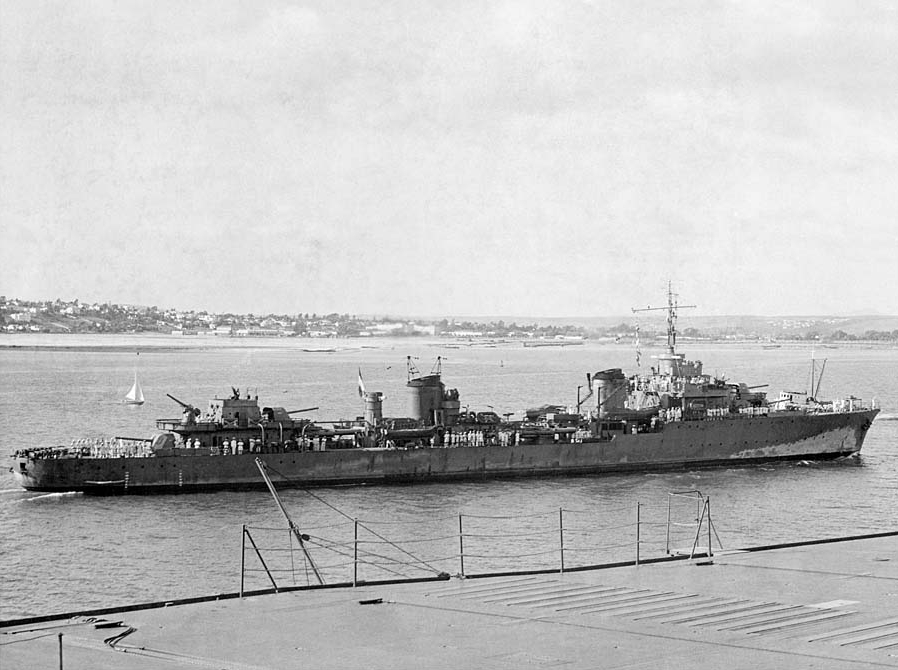
- Le Triomphant in San Diego harbor, 26 April 1941

History

France
- Name: Le Triomphant
- Namesake: "The triumphant one"
- Ordered: 22 May 1931
- Builder: Ateliers et Chantiers de France, Dunkerque
- Laid down: 28 August 1931
- Launched: 16 April 1934
- Completed: 25 May 1936
- Commissioned: 31 December 1935
- In service: 24 July 1936
- Reclassified: As a light cruiser, 28 September 1943
- Fate: Sold for scrap, December 1957

General characteristics (as built)
- Class & type: Le Fantasque-class destroyer
- Displacement: 2,569 t (2,528 long tons) (standard); 3,417 t (3,363 long tons) (deep load)
- Length: 132.4 m (434 ft 5 in)
- Beam: 12 m (39 ft 4 in)
- Draft: 4.5 m (14 ft 9 in)
- Installed power: 4 water-tube boilers; 74,000 PS (54,000 kW; 73,000 shp)
- Propulsion: 2 shafts; 2 geared steam turbines
- Speed: 37 knots (69 km/h; 43 mph) (designed)
- Range: 2,700–2,900 nmi (5,000–5,400 km; 3,100–3,300 mi) at 15 knots (28 km/h; 17 mph)
- Complement: 11 officers, 254 sailors (wartime)
- Armament: 5 × single 138.6 mm (5.5 in) guns; 2 × single 37 mm (1.5 in) AA guns; 2 × twin 13.2 mm (0.52 in) AA machine guns; 3 × triple 550 mm (21.7 in) torpedo tubes; 2 × chutes for 28 depth charges; 40 × mines

Le Triomphant ("The triumphant one") was one of six Le Fantasque-class large destroyers (contre-torpilleur, "Torpedo-boat destroyer") built for the Marine Nationale (French Navy) during the 1930s. The ship entered service in 1935 and participated in the Second World War. When war was declared in September 1939, all of the Le Fantasques were assigned to the Force de Raid which was tasked to hunt down German commerce raiders and blockade runners. Le Triomphant and two of her sister ships were based in Dakar, French West Africa, to patrol the Central Atlantic for several months in late 1939. They returned to Metropolitan France before the end of the year and were transferred to French Algeria in late April 1940 in case Italy decided to enter the war. Le Triomphant played a minor role in the Norwegian Campaign in late April and was under repair when the Germans invaded France in May. She sailed to Britain to avoid capture in June.

The ship was seized by the British in early July and was transferred to the Free French in August. After a refit, Le Triomphant began escorting convoys before the end of 1940 and was transferred to the Pacific Ocean in mid-1941. Later that year, she received orders to return to the Mediterranean in December, but they were cancelled when the Pacific War began on 8 December. Aside from a refit that lasted 10 months, the ship was on convoy escort duties until late 1943. Ordered again to return to the Mediterranean, Le Triomphant was badly damaged by a typhoon in the Indian Ocean and had to be sent to the United States for permanent repairs and modernization that lasted until mid-1945.

The ship was sent to French Indochina after the Japanese surrender in September to provide support for the French forces there. After returning to Metropolitan France in mid-1946, she was intermittently active until late 1949. Le Triomphant was placed in reserve at that time and was sold for scrap in 1957.

== Design and description ==
The Le Fantasque-class ships were designed to counter the fast Italian Condottieri-class light cruisers and one member of the class, Le Terrible, set a world record for a ship with a conventional hull that was in excess of 45 knots (83 km/h; 52 mph). They had an overall length of 132.4 meters (434 ft 5 in), a beam of 12 meters (39 ft 4 in), and a draft of 4.5 meters (14 ft 9 in). The ships displaced 2,569 metric tons (2,528 long tons) at standard and 3,417 metric tons (3,363 long tons) at deep load. Le Triomphant was powered by two Parsons geared steam turbines, each driving one propeller shaft, using steam provided by four water-tube boilers. The turbines were designed to produce 74,000 metric horsepower (54,000 kW; 73,000 shp), which would propel the ship at 37 knots (69 km/h; 43 mph). During her sea trials on 26 November 1935, her turbines provided 98,529 metric horsepower (72,468 kW; 97,181 shp) and she reached 43.1 knots (79.8 km/h; 49.6 mph) for a single hour. The Parsons turbines were more economical than the Rateau-Bretagne turbines which gave those ships equipped with them a range of 2,900 nautical miles (5,400 km; 3,300 mi) versus 2,700 nmi (5,000 km; 3,100 mi) at 15 knots (28 km/h; 17 mph). The crew of the Le Fantasque class consisted of 11 officers and 221 crewmen in peacetime and the number of the latter increased to 254 in wartime.

The main armament of the Le Fantasques consisted of five Canon de 138.6 mm (5.5 in) Modèle 1929 guns in single mounts, one superfiring pair fore and aft of the superstructure and the fifth gun abaft the aft funnel. Their anti-aircraft (AA) armament consisted of two Canon de 37 mm (1.5 in) Modèle 1925 guns in single mounts positioned amidships and four Hotchkiss Mitrailleuse de 13.2 mm (0.52 in) CA Modèle 1929 in two twin-gun mounts aft of the 37 mm mounts. The ships carried three above-water triple sets of 550-millimeter (21.7 in) torpedo tubes; the aft mount could traverse to both sides, but the forward mounts were positioned one on each broadside. A pair of depth charge chutes were built into their stern; these housed a total of sixteen 200-kilogram (440 lb) depth charges with another dozen available in the torpedo magazine. They could also be fitted with rails capable of handling 40 naval mines.

=== Modifications ===
In April 1939, the bridge wings were enlarged to accommodate the Hotchkiss machine guns on Le Triomphant, L'Indomptable and Le Malin. After the war began, 200 kg depth-charge stowage increased to 48 and a pair of rails were installed on the stern for 35-kilogram (77 lb) depth charges. Each rail could accommodate 3 depth charges and 15 more were stored in the magazine. In early 1940 twin-gun 37 mm mounts replaced the single-gun mounts. Under Free French control as of 3 July, Le Triomphant was refitted in late 1940 during which she had her aft superfiring 138.6 mm gun replaced by a British 4-inch (102 mm) Mk V AA gun and a Type 128 ASDIC system that had been taken from a seized French destroyer was installed. The 35 kg depth charges and their rails were removed and the ship was fitted with four Modèle 1918 depth-charge throwers abreast the aft superstructure for 100-kilogram (220 lb) depth charges. Two of these were stowed next to each mount and eighteen more were stowed in the magazine.

During a subsequent refit in mid-1941, the Hotchkiss machine guns were relocated to positions on the forecastle deck and their former positions were occupied by single mounts for 2-pounder (40 mm (1.6 in)) Mk II AA guns. A quadruple mount for Hotchkiss machine guns taken from the battleship Paris was installed atop the aft superstructure and rails for 18 British Mk VIIH depth charges were installed on the stern. A fixed antenna for a Type 286M search radar was also installed. A late 1942 refit in Australia exchanged the 13.2 mm machine guns for six 20-millimeter (0.8 in) Oerlikon light AA guns and the Type 286M radar was replaced by a Type 290 system with a rotating antenna.

En route to the Boston Navy Yard in 1944 for a comprehensive refit, Le Triomphant stopped in Bizerte, French Tunisia, where the British Mk V AA gun was replaced by a 138.6 mm gun from L'Audacieux. The Americans installed SA early-warning, SF surface-search and a British Type 285 fire-control radar, removed her aft torpedo tubes to save weight and converted some boiler feedwater tanks to fuel oil to improve her range. Her AA armament had been removed earlier and now consisted of six 40-millimeter (1.6 in) Bofors guns in a twin-gun mount superfiring over the aft 138.6 mm guns, and two other twin mounts forward of the aft funnel; she now carried eleven Oerlikon guns in single mounts, four on the sides of the bridge and the remaining guns on platforms on the aft superstructure, on the quarterdeck, and where the aft torpedo mount had been.

== Construction and career ==
Ordered on 22 May 1931 as part of the 1930 Naval Program, Le Triomphant was laid down on 28 August 1931 by Ateliers et Chantiers de France at their shipyard in Dunkerque. She was launched on 16 April 1934, commissioned on 31 December 1935, completed on 25 May 1936 and entered service on 24 July. Completion was delayed when her turbines stripped some of their blades and required lengthy repairs. When the Le Fantasques entered service they were assigned to the newly formed 8th and 10th Light Divisions (Divisions légère) which were later redesignated as scout divisions (Division de contre-torpilleurs); both divisions were assigned to the 2nd Light Squadron (2eme Escadre légère) in Brest. As of 1 October 1936 Le Triomphant, L'Indomptable and Le Malin were assigned to the 8th Light Division while Le Fantasque, Le Terrible and L'Audacieux belonged to the 10th. Between 15 January and 26 February 1937, the 2nd Light Squadron cruised as far south as Conakry, French West Africa. On 27 May, Alphonse Gasnier-Duparc, Minister of the Navy, reviewed the fleet, including all of the Le Fantasques.

=== World War II ===
Both the 8th and 10th Scout Divisions were assigned to the Force de Raid at Brest when war was declared in September 1939; it made only a single sortie as a complete unit on 2–6 September when it responded to an erroneous report that German ships had left port. Afterwards it was dispersed into smaller groups to search for German commerce raiders and blockade runners. During 21–30 October, the Force de Raid, including all of the Le Fantasques, screened Convoy KJ 4 against a possible attack by the heavy cruiser Admiral Graf Spee. On 25 November the 8th Scout Division, consisting of Le Triomphant, L'Indomptable, and Le Malin, rendezvoused with the battleship Strasbourg and escorted her to Brest. Her sister, Dunkerque, sailed for Canada on 11 December with a cargo of gold and she was escorted for the next two days by Le Triomphant, Le Terrible, Valmy, Mogador and Volta.

In anticipation of an Italian declaration of war, the Force de Raid, including the 8th Scout Division, assembled in Mers-el-Kébir, French Algeria, on 5–9 April 1940, only to return to Brest when the Germans invaded Norway on the 10th. On the night of 23/24 April 1940, the 8th Scout Division made a high-speed patrol of the Skaggerak (Operation Rake), hoping to attack German merchantmen headed for Norway. They encountered two patrol boats and damaged one of them while also engaging a pair of S-boats to little effect and narrowly missed spotting a convoy of minelayers. Le Malin then began experiencing engine problems and the ships were forced to reduce speed. Near-misses by German bombers damaged one of Le Triomphant's propeller shafts as they withdrew and she returned to Lorient on 30 April for repairs. As the Germans advanced in France and threatened the harbors in Brittany, the ship departed for Plymouth on 21 June.

==== Free French service ====
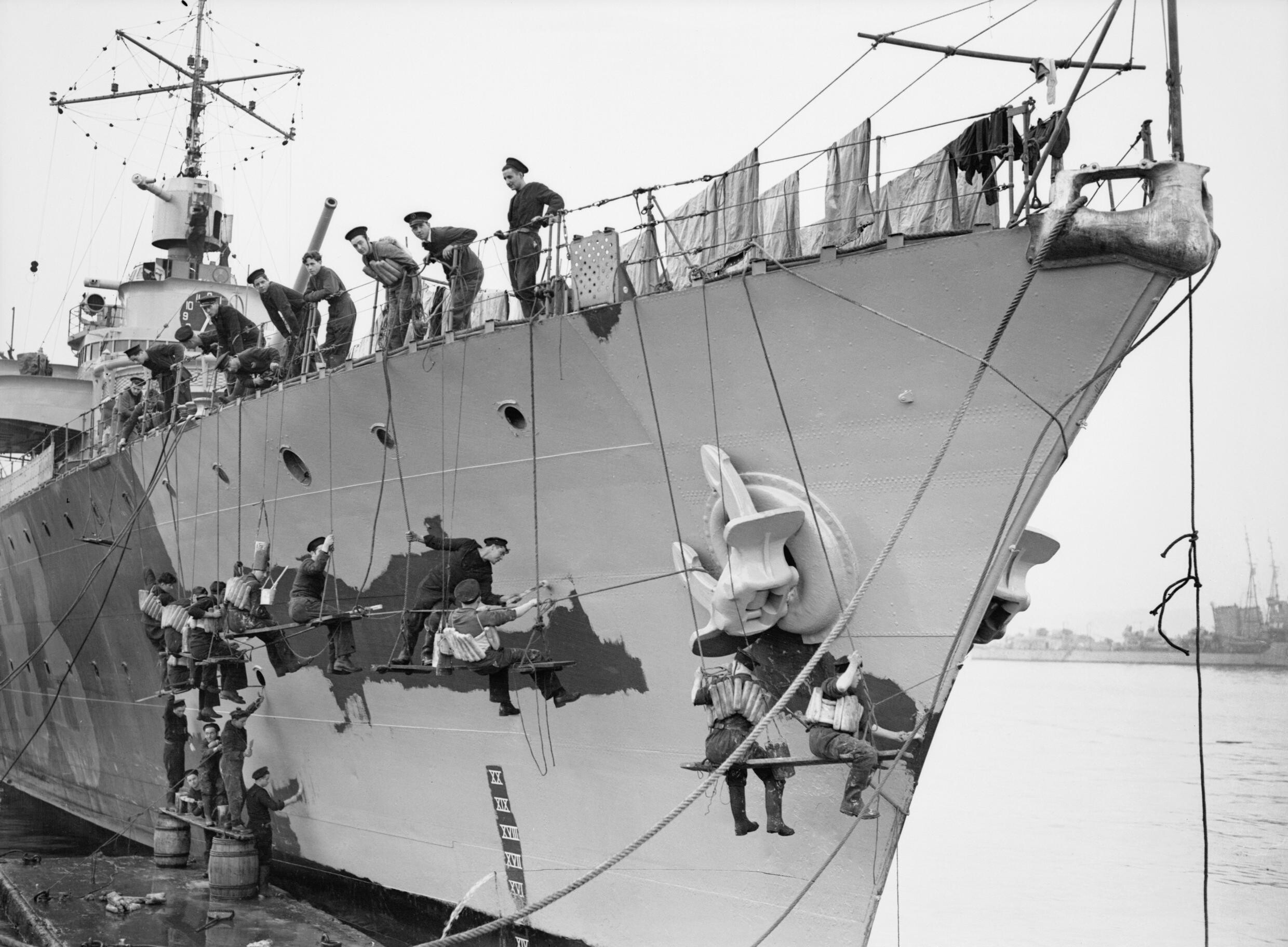
Le Triomphant having her bow painted by her crew in late 1940

On 3 July she was seized by the British at Plymouth as part of Operation Catapult, but the ship was turned over to the FNFL on 28 August and Commander (Capitaine de frégate) Philippe Auboyneau assumed command of the ship. She was partially refitted with British equipment in September–October and recommissioned on 23 October, although the ship was not ready to go back to sea until November when she was assigned to the 11th Escort Group, based on the Firth of Clyde in western Scotland. Le Triomphant had constant problems with her propulsion machinery and propeller shafts during this time, which were aggravated when she broke loose from her mooring in Greenock during a gale in February 1941 and collided with a cargo ship. The ship received a major refit at HM Dockyard, Devonport in May–July to prepare her for service in the Pacific Ocean for which she departed on 31 July via the Panama Canal. As Le Triomphant passed through the canal on 16 August, she was recognised and reported by a Japanese observer, whose transmission was intercepted by Magic. The ship reached San Diego on 25 August and received some minor repairs before she sailed for Tahiti on 5 September. Le Triomphant transported Georges Thierry d'Argenlieu, the Free French High Commissioner for the Pacific during this voyage and reached Papeete harbor on 23 September. The ship spent the next month visiting many of the islands of French Polynesia and British Fiji before arriving back in Papeete on 22 October.

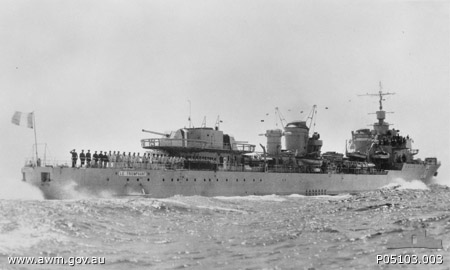
Starboard aft quarter view of Le Triomphant

At that time, she received orders from the Admiralty to return to the Mediterranean and to be at Suez, Egypt, no later than 13 December. While leaving Wellington, New Zealand, Le Triomphant was damaged by a violent and sudden gust of wind and was under repair in Sydney, Australia, on 8 December when the Japanese attacked Pearl Harbor. In mid-December, she escorted the troopship SS Ormiston from Sydney to Nouméa, New Caledonia, and conducted other escort missions during this time. In late February 1942, as a Japanese invasion of Nauru and Ocean Island was feared, Le Triomphant helped to evacuate the small military contingent and the European and Chinese workers from both islands. The ship resumed her earlier duties before she began a refit at the Garden Island Dockyard in Sydney on 19 March. Completion of the refit was delayed by the heavy workload there and it was not finished until 20 January 1943. Le Triomphant was reassigned to escort duties, mostly between Sydney and Melbourne and she rescued survivors of the torpedoed BHP Shipping iron ore carrier SS Iron Knight off Cape Howe on 8 February. Between 10 February and 23 May, the ship conducted 19 escort missions before entering Williamstown Dockyard in Melbourne for the installation of her port propeller chase on 26 May. Le Triomphant resumed escort missions after the installation was completed on 17 June and Captain (Capitaine de vaisseau) Paul Ortoli relieved Auboyneau in July. The ship was overhauled again in Sydney from 8 September to 7 November. She was reclassified as a light cruiser on 28 September.

On 24 November, a five-man liaison team from the Royal Australian Navy boarded the ship in Melbourne. Le Triomphant departed Fremantle the following day to return to the Mediterranean, accompanied by the American oil tanker SS Cedar Mills. A few days later, an accident while starting to refuel damaged the oil transfer gear, which meant that the cruiser only had 170 metric tons (170 t) of fuel in her tanks; to conserve fuel, Cedar Mills started towing Le Triomphant. The transfer gear was finally repaired on 1 December and she was able to top off her oil tanks. During the night of 2/3 December, the ships were struck by a typhoon and Le Triomphant was badly damaged. She took on a 15 degree list and her forward boiler and engine rooms were flooded. After taking off some of the crew, Cedar Mills was able to re-establish the tow on 5 December. The heavy cruiser HMS Frobisher took over the task and towed the large destroyer to Diego Suarez, French Madagascar, on 19 December. Temporary repairs there took until 21 February 1944 when she sailed for Boston, Massachusetts, for permanent repairs that lasted for a year after her arrival there on 12 April. En route, Le Triomphant stopped at Algiers where she was inspected by General Charles de Gaulle, leader of the Free French, and the High Commissioner for the Navy, Louis Jacquinot. Ordered to the Indian Ocean in 1945, she served with the Eastern Fleet after her arrival in Colombo, Ceylon, on 27 May. After a brief refit in Diego Suarez in July, she covered the British occupation of Singapore in early September together with the French battleship Richelieu.

=== Postwar activities ===
Le Triomphant was the first French warship to deploy to French Indochina after the war, arriving in Saigon on 3 October 1945 and alternated with Le Fantasque in providing gunfire support to the French garrison at Nha Trang and then supporting French forces on the coast of the Gulf of Tonkin until February 1946. On 6 March she led a convoy to Haiphong which the French were to take over from the Chinese, but they engaged the convoy for 20 minutes before a cease-fire could be negotiated. Le Triomphant was lightly damaged, but 8 of her crew had been killed and 39 wounded. The sisters participated in a naval review in Ha Long Bay on 24 March before Le Triomphant departed for France on 9 April where she arrived at Toulon on 16 May.

The ship was reduced to reserve upon her return and was refitted at Bizerte from February to November 1947. During this time, only two of the four surviving ships of the class were active at any one time because of a shortage of trained personnel. When Le Triomphant arrived at Toulon on 7 February, she relieved Le Malin in the 10th Light Cruiser Division (10^{e} Division de croiseurs légers). The ship remained on active duty until she was placed in reserve at Bizerte on 1 November 1949. Le Triomphant was sold for scrap in December 1957 and was subsequently broken up.

== Bibliography ==
- Bertrand, Michel (1982). La Marine française au combat [The French Navy in Combat: Battles in the Atlantic with the Free French Naval Forces] (in French). Vol. I: Des combats de l'Atlantique aux F.N.F.L. Paris: Charles-Lavauzelle. ISBN 2-7025-0002-1.
- Jordan, John & Dumas, Robert (2009). French Battleships 1922–1956. Barnsley, UK: Seaforth Punblishing. ISBN 978-1-84832-034-5.
- Jordan, John & Moulin, Jean (2015). French Destroyers: Torpilleurs d'Escadre & Contre-Torpilleurs 1922–1956. Barnsley, UK: Seaforth Publishing. ISBN 978-1-84832-198-4.
- Roberts, John (1980). "France". In Chesneau, Roger (ed.). Conway's All the World's Fighting Ships 1922–1946. New York: Mayflower Books. pp. 255–279. ISBN 0-8317-0303-2.
- Rohwer, Jürgen (2005). Chronology of the War at Sea 1939–1945: The Naval History of World War Two (Third Revised ed.). Annapolis, Maryland: Naval Institute Press. ISBN 1-59114-119-2.
- Waters, Sydney D. (1956). The Royal New Zealand Navy. The Official History of New Zealand in the Second World War, 1939–1945. Wellington, New Zealand: Historical Publications Branch. OCLC 173284131.
- Whitley, M. J. (1988). Destroyers of World War Two: An International Encyclopedia. Annapolis, Maryland: Naval Institute Press. ISBN 0-87021-326-1.
