= French destroyer L'Indomptable =

French Le Fantasque-class large destroyer

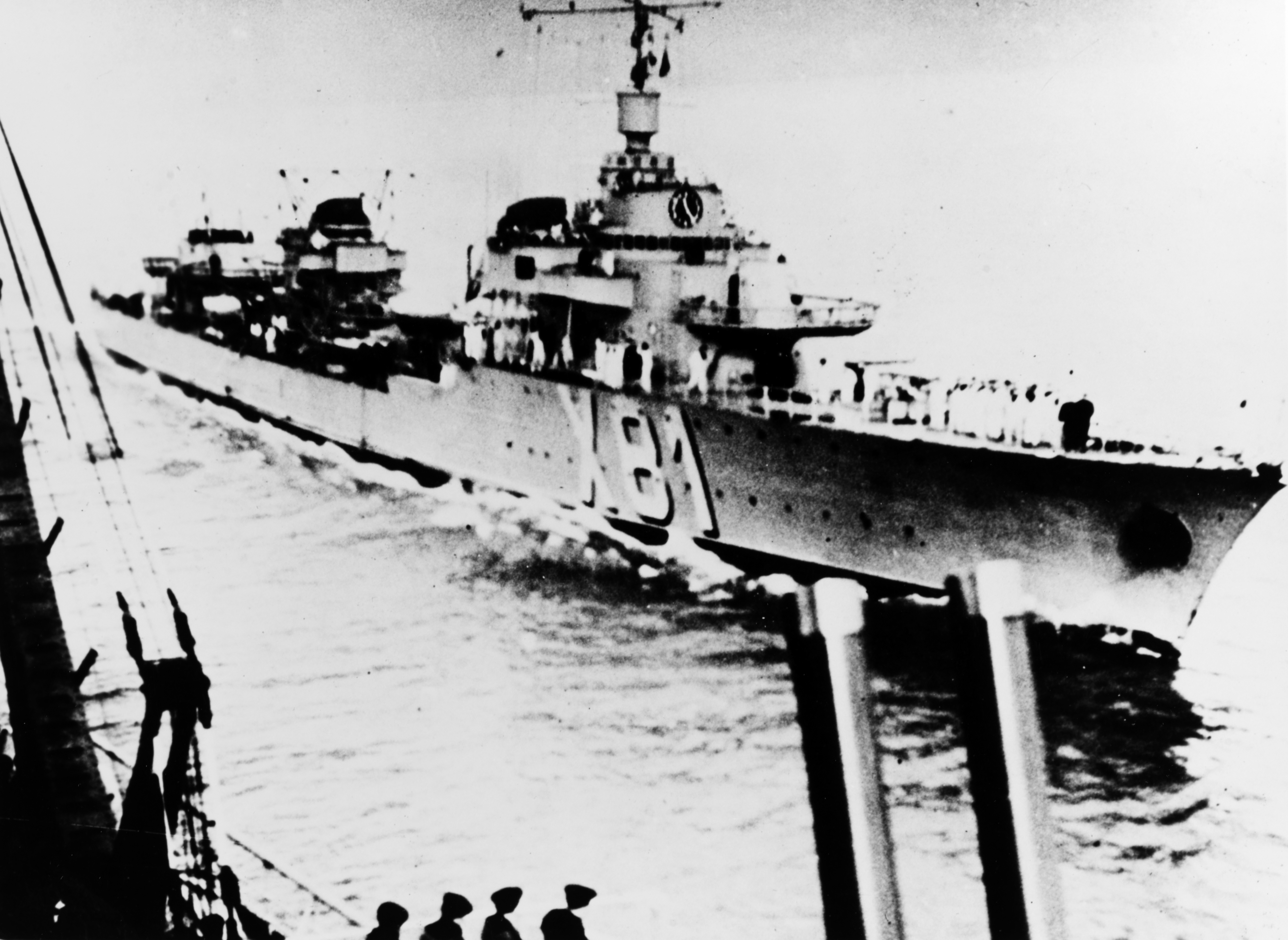
- L'Indomptable at sea circa 1939

History

France
- Name: L'Indomptable
- Ordered: 18 August 1931
- Builder: Forges et Chantiers de la Méditerranée, La Seyne-sur-Mer
- Laid down: 25 January 1932
- Launched: 7 December 1933
- Completed: 10 February 1936
- Commissioned: 15 November 1935
- In service: 15 April 1936
- Fate: Scuttled, 27 November 1942

General characteristics (as built)
- Class & type: Le Fantasque-class destroyer
- Displacement: 2,569 t (2,528 long tons) (standard); 3,417 t (3,363 long tons) (deep load)
- Length: 132.4 m (434 ft 5 in)
- Beam: 12 m (39 ft 4 in)
- Draft: 4.5 m (14 ft 9 in)
- Installed power: 4 water-tube boilers; 74,000 PS (54,000 kW; 73,000 shp)
- Propulsion: 2 shafts; 2 geared steam turbines
- Speed: 37 knots (69 km/h; 43 mph) (designed)
- Range: 2,900 nmi (5,400 km; 3,300 mi) at 15 knots (28 km/h; 17 mph)
- Complement: 11 officers, 254 sailors (wartime)
- Armament: 5 × single 138.6 mm (5.5 in) guns; 2 × single 37 mm (1.5 in) AA guns; 2 × twin 13.2 mm (0.52 in) AA machine guns; 3 × triple 550 mm (21.7 in) torpedo tubes; 2 × chutes for 28 depth charges; 40 × mines

L'Indomptable ("The indomitable one") was one of six Le Fantasque-class large destroyers (contre-torpilleur, "Torpedo-boat destroyer") built for the Marine Nationale (French Navy) during the 1930s. The ship entered service in 1935 and participated in the Second World War. When war was declared in September 1939, all of the Le Fantasques were assigned to the Force de Raid (Raiding Force) which was tasked to hunt down German commerce raiders and blockade runners. L'Indomptable made one sortie into the Skaggerak in April 1940 and was then transferred to French Algeria in late April 1940 in case Italy decided to enter the war. She screened French cruisers several times as they unsuccessfully hunted for Italian ships after Italy declared war in June.

The ship was assigned to the Vichy French High Sea Forces (Forces de haute mer) when it was formed after the French surrender in June. L'Indomptable was scuttled in Toulon when the Germans occupied Vichy France in November 1942. Heavily damaged during Allied air raids, the ship was not salvaged during the war; her bow was raised in mid-1945 and used to replace the bow of one of her sister ships. Her wreck was broken up in 1950.

== Design and description ==
The Le Fantasque-class ships were designed to counter the fast Italian Condottieri-class light cruisers and one member of the class, Le Terrible, set a world record for a ship with a conventional hull that was in excess of 45 knots (83 km/h; 52 mph). They had an overall length of 132.4 meters (434 ft 5 in), a beam of 12 meters (39 ft 4 in), and a draft of 4.5 meters (14 ft 9 in). The ships displaced 2,569 metric tons (2,528 long tons) at standard and 3,417 metric tons (3,363 long tons) at deep load. They were powered by two Parsons geared steam turbines, each driving one propeller shaft, using steam provided by four water-tube boilers. The turbines were designed to produce 74,000 metric horsepower (54,000 kW; 73,000 shp), which was intended to give the ships a maximum speed of 37 knots (69 km/h; 43 mph). During L'Indomptable's sea trials on 26 July 1935, her turbines provided 96,112 metric horsepower (70,690 kW; 94,797 shp) and she reached 42.3 knots (78.3 km/h; 48.7 mph) for a single hour. She carried enough fuel oil to give her a range of 2,900 nautical miles (5,400 km; 3,300 mi) at 15 knots (28 km/h; 17 mph). The crew of the Le Fantasque class consisted of 11 officers and 221 crewmen in peacetime, with the number of the latter increasing to 254 in wartime.

The main armament of the Le Fantasques consisted of five Canon de 138.6 mm (5.5 in) Modèle 1929 guns in single mounts, protected by gun shields, one superfiring pair fore and aft of the superstructure and the fifth gun abaft the aft funnel. Their anti-aircraft armament consisted of two Canon de 37 mm (1.5 in) Modèle 1925 guns in single mounts positioned amidships and four Hotchkiss Mitrailleuse de 13.2 mm (0.52 in) CA Modèle 1929 in two twin-gun mounts aft of the 37 mm mounts. The ships carried three above-water triple sets of 550-millimeter (21.7 in) torpedo tubes; the aft mount could traverse to both sides, but the forward mounts were positioned one on each broadside. A pair of depth charge chutes were built into their stern; these housed a total of sixteen 200-kilogram (440 lb) depth charges with another dozen available in the torpedo magazine. They could also be fitted with rails capable of handling 40 naval mines.

=== Modifications ===
In April 1939 the bridge wings were enlarged to accommodate the Hotchkiss machine guns. After the war began, depth-charge stowage increased to 48 and a pair of rails were installed on the stern for 35-kilogram (77 lb) depth charges. Each rail could accommodate 3 depth charges and 15 more were stored in the magazine. In early 1940 twin-gun 37 mm mounts replaced the single-gun mounts and in October–November a pair of Browning 13.2-millimeter anti-aircraft machine guns were installed on the quarterdeck. In 1941–1942 the quarterdeck guns were transferred to positions forward of the bridge and the Hotchkiss machine guns were repositioned on new platforms on the center superstructure. L'Indomptable had the aft superstructure remodeled in 1941 to create a platform atop the aft ammunition hoists and platforms on each side for 37 mm guns. The twin-gun mounts was repositioned on the upper platform and one of the lower platforms while the other one was occupied by a single mount as there was a shortage of twin-gun mounts. In 1942 the ship was provided with an Alpha-2 sonar system in cases, pending the modification of the hull to accommodate the required flexible underwater dome scheduled for the following year.

== Construction ==
Ordered on 18 August 1931 as part of the 1930 Naval Program, L'Indomptable was laid down by Forges et Chantiers de la Méditerranée at their shipyard in La Seyne-sur-Mer, France, on 25 January 1932. She was launched on 7 December 1933, commissioned on 15 November 1935, completed on 10 February 1936 and entered service on 15 April. Completion was delayed when her turbines stripped some of their blades and required lengthy repairs.

== Service history ==
=== Pre-World War II ===
When the Le Fantasques entered service they were assigned to the newly formed 8th and 10th Light Divisions (Division légère) which were later redesignated as scout divisions (Division de contre-torpilleurs); both divisions were assigned to the 2nd Light Squadron (2eme Escadre légère) in Brest. On 12 May 1936, L'Indomptable and the submarine Pasteur collided at the mouth of the Gironde during an exercise of the 2nd Light Squadron. Albert Lebrun, President of France, inaugurated the new building of the Naval Academy (École Navale) in Brest and reviewed the 2nd Light Squadron — including L'Indomptable, L'Audacieux, Le Fantasque, and Le Terrible— on 30 May 1936.

As of 1 October 1936 L'Indomptable, Le Triomphant and Le Malin were assigned to the 8th Light Division while Le Fantasque, Le Terrible and L'Audacieux belonged to the 10th. Between 15 January and 26 February 1937, the 2nd Light Squadron cruised as far south as Conakry, French West Africa. On 27 May, Alphonse Gasnier-Duparc, Minister of the Navy, reviewed the fleet, including all of the Le Fantasque's.

=== World War II ===
Both the 8th and 10th Scout Divisions were assigned to the Force de Raid when war was declared in September 1939; it made only a single sortie as a complete unit on 2–6 September when it responded to an erroneous report that German ships had left port. Afterwards it was dispersed into smaller groups to search for German commerce raiders and blockade runners. During 21–30 October, the Force de Raid, including all of the Le Fantasques, screened Convoy KJ 4 against a possible attack by the heavy cruiser Admiral Graf Spee. On 25 November the 8th Scout Division, which consisted of L'Indomptable, Le Malin, and Le Triomphant, rendezvoused with the battleship Strasbourg and escorted her to Brest. In anticipation of an Italian declaration of war, the Force de Raid, including the 8th Scout Division, assembled in Mers-el-Kébir, French Algeria, on 5–9 April, only to return to Brest when the Germans invaded Norway on the 10th. On the night of 23/24 April 1940, the 8th Scout Division made a high-speed patrol of the Skaggerak (Operation Rake), hoping to attack German merchantmen headed for Norway. They encountered two patrol boats and damaged one of them while also engaging a pair of S-boats to little effect and narrowly missed spotting a convoy of minelayers. Le Malin then began having engine problems and the ships were forced to reduce speed. Near-misses by German bombers damaged one of Le Triomphant's propeller shafts as they withdrew. L'Indomptable and Le Malin returned to Mers-el-Kébir on 9 May, but transferred shortly afterwards to nearby Algiers. She took part in a sortie by the Force de Raid into the Western Mediterranean on 12–13 June, after Italy declared war on the Allies on the 10th. L'Indomptable then began escorting convoys evacuating people from mainland France to French North Africa, and escorted cruisers fruitlessly searching for Italian cruisers on 23–24 June after an erroneous report that they were at sea. After the British attack on Mers-el-Kébir on 3 July, the ship escorted the cruisers that attempted to rendezvous with Strasbourg after she escaped from Mers-el-Kébir and later arrived at Toulon.

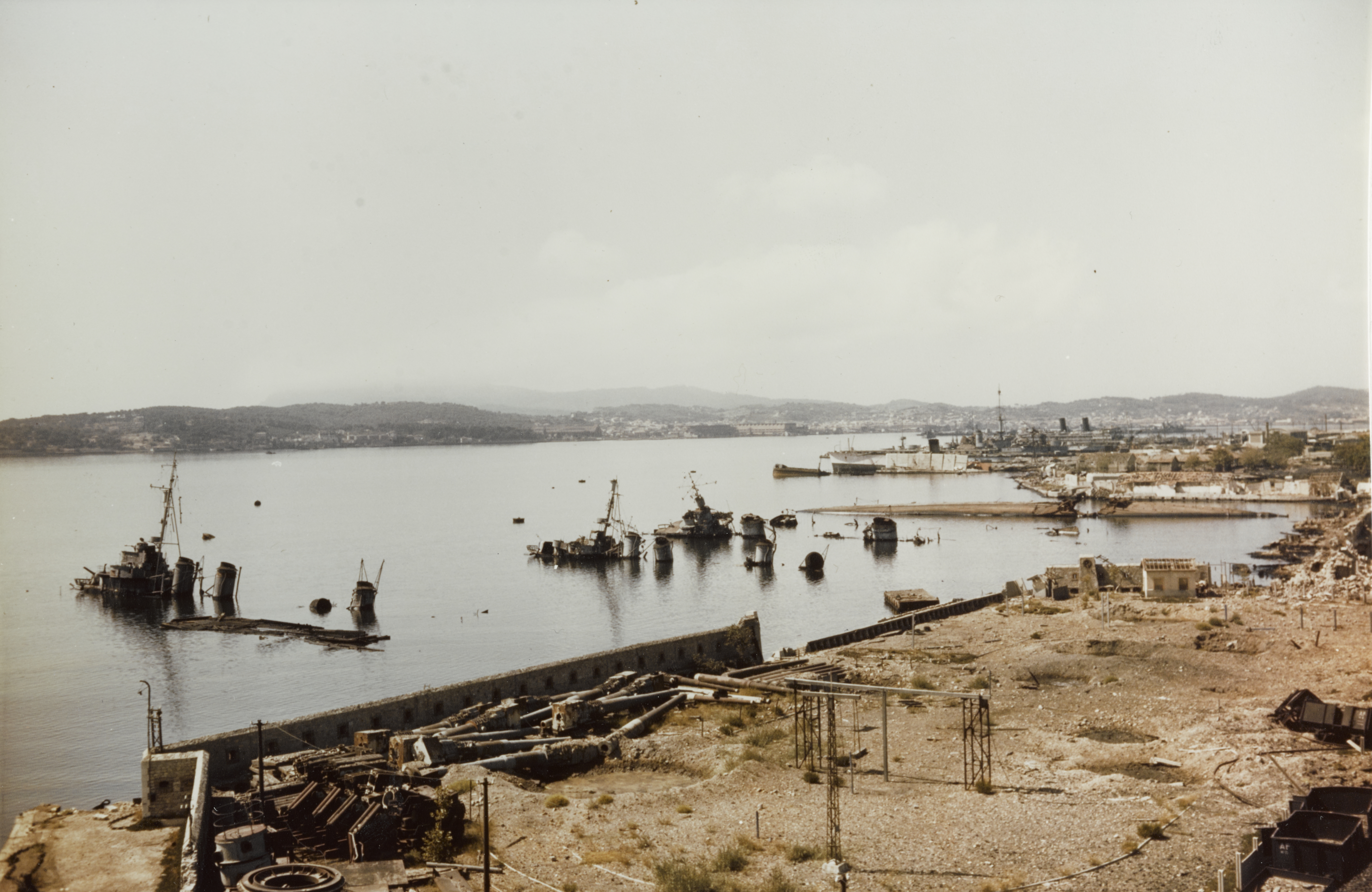
A view of Toulon harbor, late 1944, looking down the length of the Quai Noël. From left to right, Tartu, Cassard and L'Indomptable (all sunk upright), Vautour (nearly fully submerged) and Aigle (capsized and blown in two). In the right center distance is the partially dismantled old battleship Condorcet.

When the Forces de haute mer was formed on 25 September, L'Indomptable was the only ship of her class assigned to it and was one of its escorts when they made a training sortie into the Western Mediterranean on 16–18 October. When the Germans attempted to capture the French ships in Toulon on 27 November 1942, the ship was scuttled by her crew. The Germans considered salvaging her and redesignated her as SG9, but the ship was badly damaged during Allied bombing raids on 4 February, 7 March and 29 April 1944 and she was deemed a constructive total loss. L'Indomptable's bow was salvaged in July 1945 and was used to replace the bow of Le Malin which had been severed in a collision with Le Terrible. L'Indomptable's wreck was scrapped in place in 1950.

== Bibliography ==
- Jordan, John & Moulin, Jean (2015). French Destroyers: Torpilleurs d'Escadre & Contre-Torpilleurs 1922–1956. Barnsley, UK: Seaforth Publishing. ISBN 978-1-84832-198-4.
- Roberts, John (1980). "France". In Chesneau, Roger (ed.). Conway's All the World's Fighting Ships 1922–1946. New York: Mayflower Books. pp. 255–279. ISBN 0-8317-0303-2.
- Rohwer, Jürgen (2005). Chronology of the War at Sea 1939–1945: The Naval History of World War Two (Third Revised ed.). Annapolis, Maryland: Naval Institute Press. ISBN 1-59114-119-2.
