= Force de Raid =

French naval squadron

The Force de Raid (Raiding Force) was a French naval squadron formed at Brest during naval mobilization for World War II. The squadron commanded by Vice Amiral d'Escadre Marcel Gensoul consisted of the most modern French capital ships Dunkerque and Strasbourg, screened by the three newest French cruisers, the eight largest and most modern contre-torpilleurs, and the only French aircraft carrier. The Force effectively ceased to exist as a separate unit after the British attack on Mers-el-Kébir.

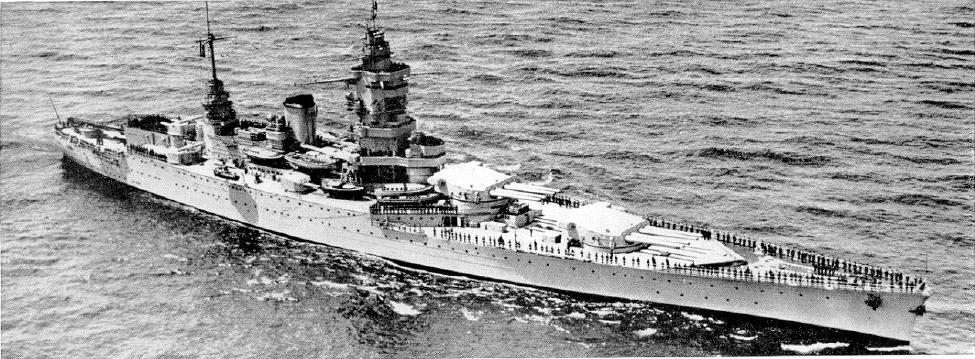
Dunkerque

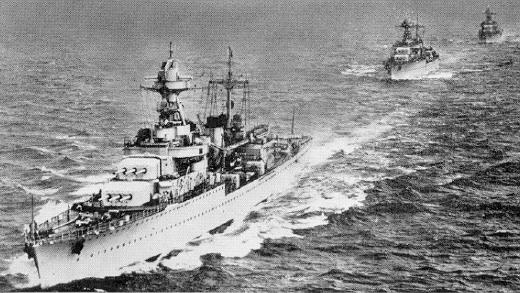
Georges Leygues

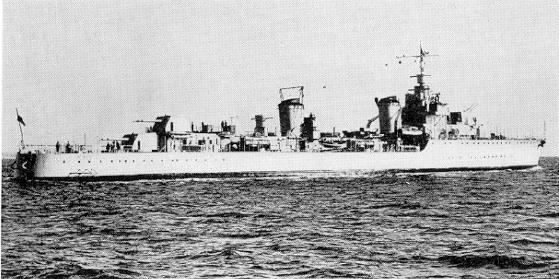
Mogador

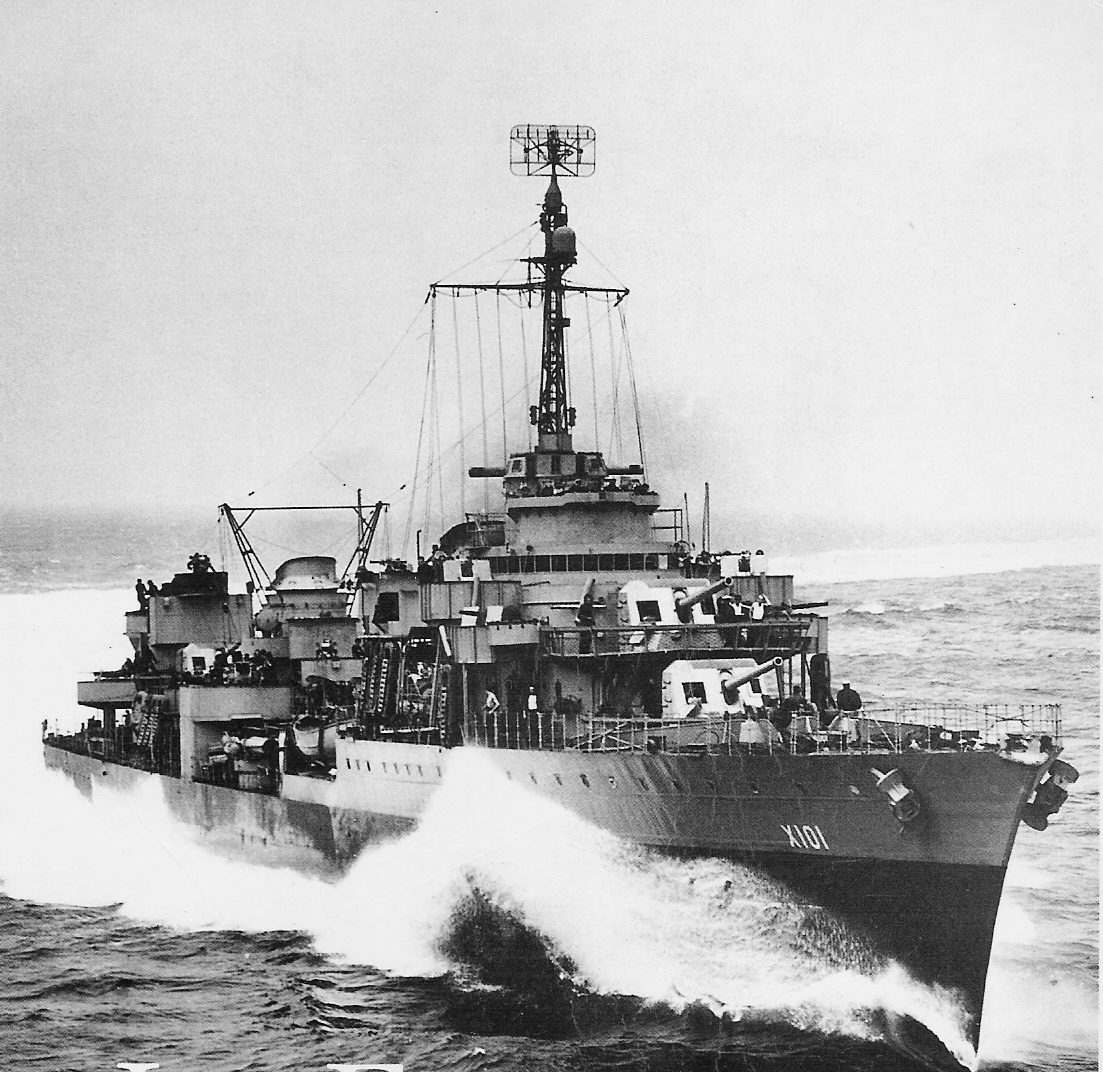
Le Fantasque

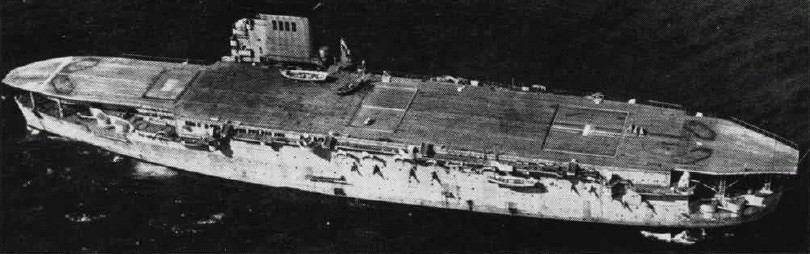
Béarn

== Strategic significance ==
Battleships had been internationally perceived as the strategic arms race focus since the Washington Naval Conference of 1921. Countries unable to match the numbers of battleships maintained by the United States and the United Kingdom had built faster battleships so they might have the option of evading stronger fleets. Italy modernized Conte di Cavour and Giulio Cesare in 1937 with new engines increasing their speed to 28 knots. Germany completed the 31-knot battleships Gneisenau in 1938 and Scharnhorst in January 1939. For the first ten months of World War II, the Dunkerque-class battleships of Force de Raid were among the few Allied battleships available to counter the Scharnhorst-class battleships. The Royal Navy battle cruisers HMS Repulse, Renown, and Hood, although older, were also generally competitive with Scharnhorst, in part due to upgrades between-the-wars, including increased horizontal protection in the first two.

The Italian battleships Vittorio Veneto and Littorio were completed in April and May 1940. Duilio was modernized to a speed of 27 knots in July, and Andrea Doria completed similar modernization in October. The German battleship Bismarck was completed in August. Britain's first modern battleship HMS King George V would not be completed until December 1940, and a British Defense Council subcommittee had concluded as recently as 1936 there was no justification for assuming aircraft could destroy battleships. This conclusion would be disproved by the battle of Taranto in November, but Winston Churchill remained focused on battleships as late as August 1941.

== History ==
The Force de Raid sortied from Brest immediately following declaration of war and temporarily patrolled off Casablanca to prevent a Kriegsmarine raid on Moroccan ports. The Allies organized eight naval hunting groups on 5 October 1939 when the pocket battleship Admiral Graf Spee began sinking merchant ships in the South Atlantic. Dunkerque, Béarn, Montcalm, Georges Leygues, Gloire, L'Audacieux, Le Fantasque, Le Malin, Le Terrible, Le Triomphant, L'Indomptable, Mogador, and Volta of Force de Raid patrolled the North Atlantic from Brest as Force L, while Strasbourg was detached to the West Indies to form Force N with HMS Hermes and Neptune. Bearn proved too slow to accompany the modern ships of Force de Raid and was soon detached for service as an aircraft transport bringing newly manufactured American warplanes to France. The remainder of Force L covered convoy KJ4 from Kingston, Jamaica to the British Isles to prevent attacks by the pocket battleship Deutschland. Strasbourg left Dakar on 21 November and was escorted back to Brest on 27 November by Le Triomphant, L'Indomptable and Le Malin. Strasbourg sailed south again with HMS Neptune as Force Y during the Battle of the River Plate.

Force de Raid shifted its base of operations from Brest to Mers El Kébir on 27 April 1940 in anticipation of Italy joining the Axis. Force de Raid was unsuccessfully attacked by Dandolo on 13 June after a sortie from Mers El Kébir in response to a false report of a Kriegsmarine squadron preparing to enter the Strait of Gibraltar.

Although the Force de Raid was berthed in colonial Africa outside Axis-occupied territory following the Second Armistice at Compiègne, the wartime British Government of Winston Churchill was greatly alarmed by the possibility that these modern capital ships might be acquired by the Axis powers, with or without French consent. When Vice Amiral Gensoul refused British demands to violate armistice conditions, the Royal Navy shelled Mers El Kébir harbor. The surviving Force de Raid battleships were repaired and transferred to Toulon.

== Order of battle ==
- Dunkerque-class battleships
  - Dunkerque
  - Strasbourg
- La Galissonnière-class cruisers
  - Montcalm
  - Marseillaise
  - Georges Leygues
  - Gloire
- Mogador-class contre-torpilleurs
  - Mogador
  - Volta
- Le Fantasque-class contre-torpilleurs
  - Le Fantasque
  - L'Audacieux
  - L'Indomptable
  - Le Malin
  - Le Terrible
  - Le Triomphant
- Aircraft carrier Béarn
