= French World War II destroyers =

At the start of hostilities in World War II, the French Navy had 71 destroyers in operation with 27 more under construction. The destroyers were built in two types, large destroyers and small destroyers.

The large destroyers were the largest and fastest in the world at that time. Starting with the Chacal class in the 1920s, France produced a series of six classes of large destroyers, known in French as contre-torpilleurs, that were designed to sink opposing cruisers by catching them with superior speed and then with their torpedoes. They were intended to drive off opposing destroyers with superior firepower. Many considered the Fantasque class to be the epitome of this super destroyer concept. The last class, the Mogador class, was less successful due to the higher penalties in building cost, running cost, and reliability.

The smaller destroyers built in the 1920s were found to be lacking in speed and seakeeping. The first two classes had top speeds of 28 to 29 knots that were insufficient to keep up with the Dunkerque- and Richelieu-class capital ships that were being built in the late 1920s. The Hardi class of 1932 was designed to have a 37-knot top end.

The emphasis on the large destroyers and the long time of construction led to a deficit of numbers in destroyer strength in the French Navy. To balance the Italian threat, the 600-ton La Melpoméne class was a group of 13 French torpedo boats built in 1933. It was designed along the lines of the Italian torpedo boats of that time, but due to its size and speed of 34.5 knots, the class is considered a light destroyer, or destroyer escort.

== Classes ==
=== Large destroyers (French: contre-torpilleur) ===
- Chacal class - 6 operational in September 1939
- Guépard class - 6 operational in September 1939
- Aigle class - 6 operational in September 1939
- Vauquelin class - 6 operational in September 1939
- Fantasque class - 6 operational in September 1939
- Mogador class - 2 operational in September 1939

=== Destroyers (French: torpilleur) ===
- Bourrasque class - 12 operational in September 1939
- Adroit class - 14 operational in September 1939
- Hardi class - 8 operational in September 1939

==== Light Destroyer/Destroyer Escort/Torpedo Boat (French: torpilleur légers) ====
- La Melpomène class - 13 operational in September 1939

== Gallery ==
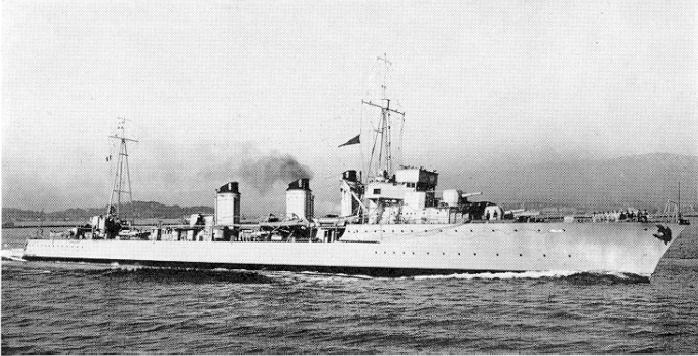
Chacal class

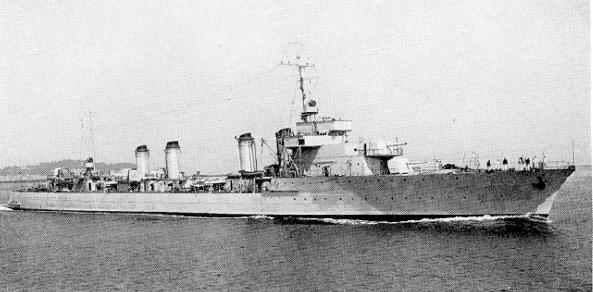
Guépard class

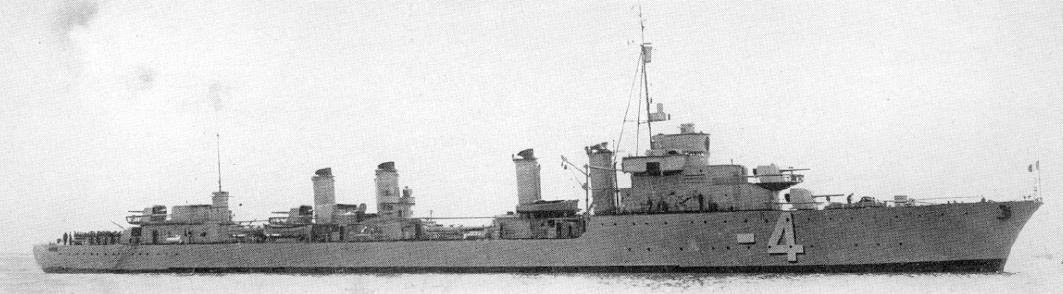
Aigle class

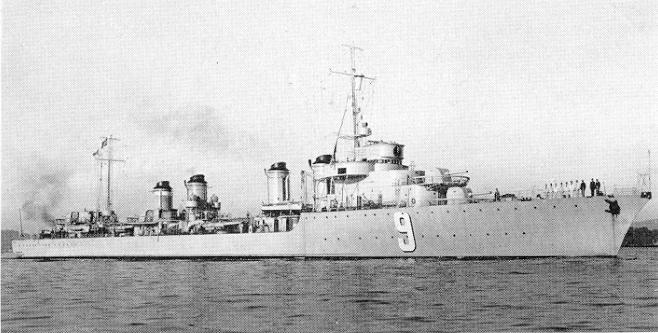
Vauquelin class

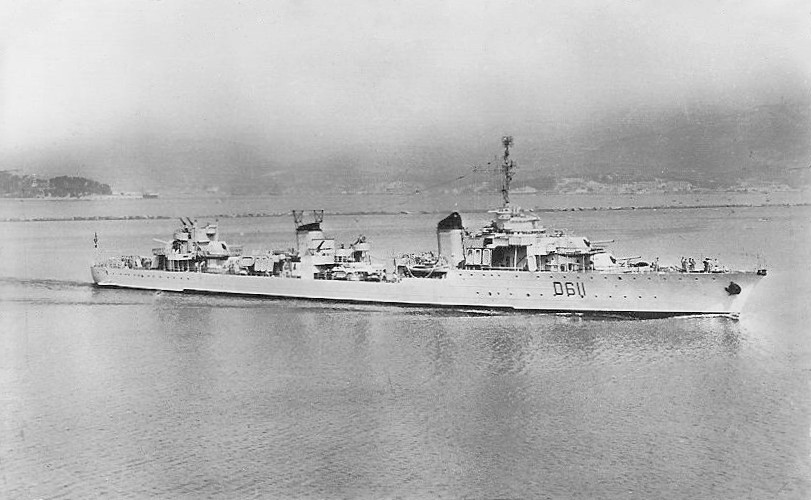
Fantasque class

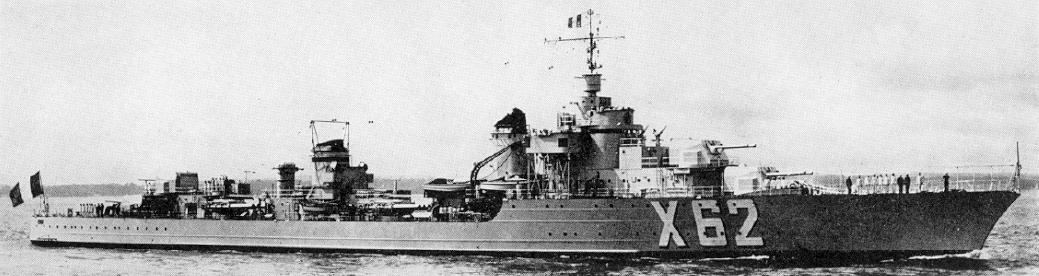
Mogador class

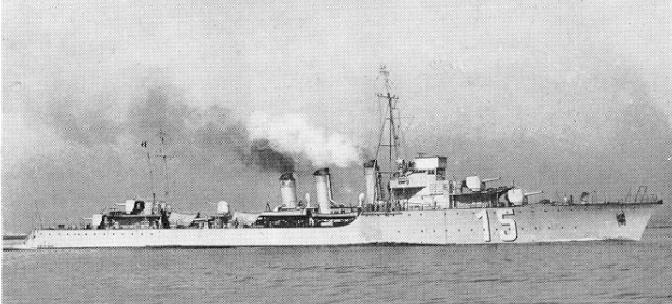
Bourrasque class

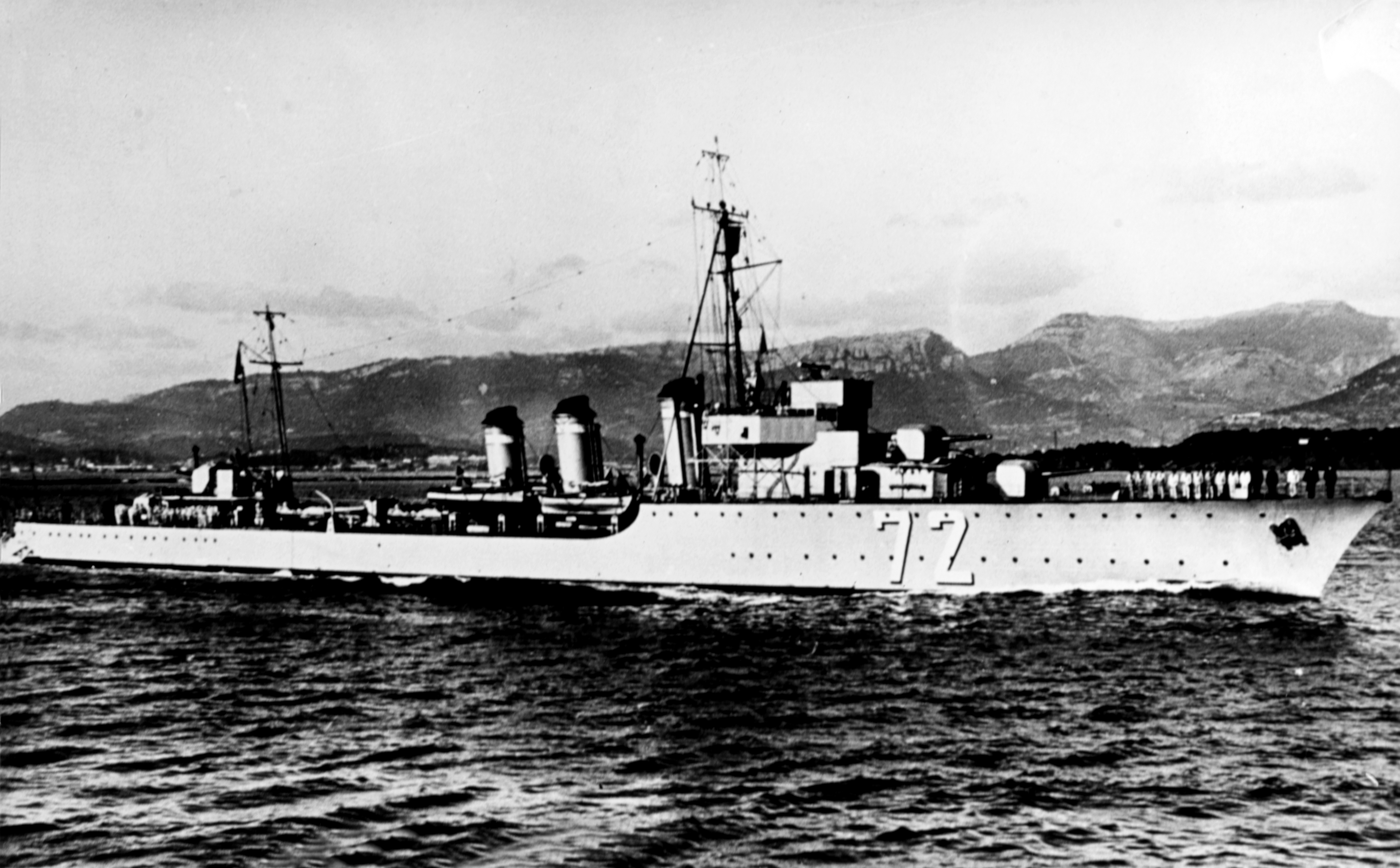
L'Adroit class

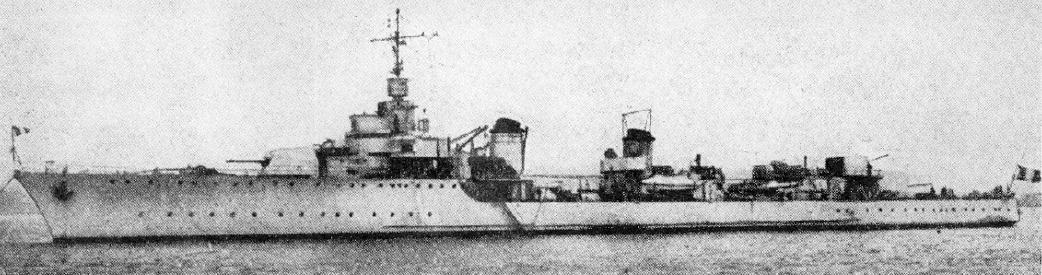
Le Hardi class
