= French destroyer Mogador =

Mogador-class destroyer

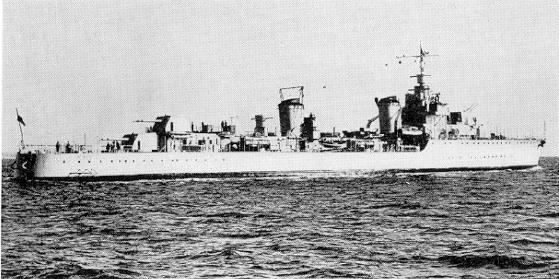
- Mogador

History

France
- Name: Mogador
- Namesake: Mogador, Morocco
- Builder: Arsenal de Lorient
- Laid down: 28 December 1934
- Launched: 9 June 1937
- Commissioned: 8 April 1939
- Fate: Scuttled, 27 November 1942, scrapped 1949

General characteristics
- Class & type: Mogador-class destroyer
- Displacement: 2,997 t (2,950 long tons) (standard)
- Length: 137.5 m (451 ft 1 in)
- Beam: 12.57 m (41 ft 3 in)
- Draft: 4.74 m (15 ft 7 in)
- Installed power: 4 water-tube boilers; 92,000 shp (69,000 kW)
- Propulsion: 2 shafts; 2 geared steam turbines
- Speed: 39 knots (72 km/h; 45 mph)
- Range: 4,345 nmi (8,047 km; 5,000 mi) at 15 knots (28 km/h; 17 mph)
- Complement: 12 officers, 226 men
- Armament: 4 × twin 138.6 mm (5.5 in) guns; 2 × single 37 mm (1.5 in) AA guns; 2 × twin 13.2 mm (0.52 in) 13.2 mm (0.52 in) AA guns; 2 × triple, 2 × twin 550 mm (22 in) torpedo tubes; 32 depth charges and up to 40 naval mines

Mogador was the lead ship of the French Navy's Mogador class of large destroyers (contre-torpilleurs). Named after the Moroccan town, she was built before the outbreak of World War II. The ship was heavily damaged during the British attack on Mers-el-Kébir on 3 July 1940, but was later repaired and sailed to Toulon. She was scuttled in Toulon Harbor when the Germans tried to seize her, along with the rest of the fleet, on 27 November 1942.

== Design and description ==
Mogador and her sister ship Volta were the last contre-torpilleurs built by the French Navy, a not entirely successful attempt to build a ship capable of out-fighting every other ship below her tonnage. "In technological terms Mogador and Volta were ships with the armament of a light cruiser in the hull of destroyer; the contre-torpilleur as a type had been pushed past the limits of its capabilities."

Mogador had an overall length of 137.5 meters (451 ft 1 in), a beam of 12.57 meters (41 ft 3 in), and a maximum draft of 4.74 meters (15 ft 7 in). She displaced 2,997 metric tons (2,950 long tons) at standard load and 4,018 metric tons (3,955 long tons) at deep load. The Rateau-Bretagne geared steam turbines were designed to produce 92,000 shaft horsepower (69,000 kW), which would propel the ship at 39 knots (72 km/h; 45 mph). During sea trials in March 1938, Mogador's turbines provided 118,320 shp (88,230 kW) and she reached 43.45 knots (80.47 km/h; 50.00 mph) for one hour. The ship carried 360 metric tons (354 long tons) of fuel oil at normal load and an additional 350 metric tons (340 long tons) at deep load.

Mogador carried eight 138.6 mm (5.5 in) Canon de 138 mm Modèle 1929 in four twin turrets, two superfiring pairs fore and aft of the superstructure. Her anti-aircraft armament consisted of two 37 mm (1.5 in) Mle 1933 guns in a single mount positioned on the rear deck house forward of the rear turrets. She also mounted four 13.2 mm (0.52 in) Mle 1929 heavy machine guns in two twin mounts located between the forward superstructure and the forward guns. Mogador carried 10 above-water 550-millimeter (22 in) torpedo tubes: a pair of triple mounts between the funnels and a pair of double mounts aft of the rear funnel. A pair of depth charge chutes were built into Mogador's stern; these housed a total of 16 Guirard depth charges. Mine rails were fitted on the rear deck that had a maximum capacity of 40 mines.

=== Modifications ===
Mogador was refitted at Lorient between January and March 1940 and a number of minor changes were made. The necessary improvements identified for the main armament during her sea trials a year prior were finally implemented, the canvas cover for the back of the turrets was replaced by a rolling door, new radios were installed, and shields were fitted to the anti-aircraft machine guns and the searchlights. A SS-6 sonar was fitted in June 1940, but proved to be ineffectual.

The French Navy decided to reinforce her anti-aircraft armament in light of its wartime experience. Her no. 3 gun turret was to be moved to the No. 4 position, its magazine converted for extra fuel storage, and a new twin 37 mm Mle 1933 mount would replace it on top of the rear deck house. Two more Mle 1933 mounts were to fitted on each side of the rear deckhouse and a fourth mount was to replace the 13.2 Hotchkiss machine guns forward of the bridge. One 13.2 mm Browning machine gun was to planned to be mounted on each side of the forward twin 37 mm guns. This plan was later amended to add a degaussing cable, replacement of the SS-6 sonar by a French copy of the British ASDIC and six of the new mitrailleuse de 25 mm contre-aéroplanes Modèle 1940 anti-aircraft guns, plus two more 13.2 mm Brownings mounted on the forward corners of the center deck house.

== Service history ==
Mogador, with her sister Volta, comprised the 6th Large Destroyer Division (6^{e} Division de contre-torpilleurs) and was assigned to the Force de Raid based at Brest when the war began. This group's purpose was to hunt German blockade runners and raiders and to escort convoys that might be in danger from the same. From 21–30 October 1939 the Force de Raid escorted the KJ.4 convoy to protect it against the Deutschland which had sortied into the North Atlantic before the war began. A sortie by Gneisenau and Scharnhorst into the North Atlantic on 21 November prompted Force de Raid to sail from Brest to rendezvous with the British battlecruiser HMS Hood and patrol the area south of Iceland, but the German ships were able to return safely under the cover of heavy weather without being engaged.

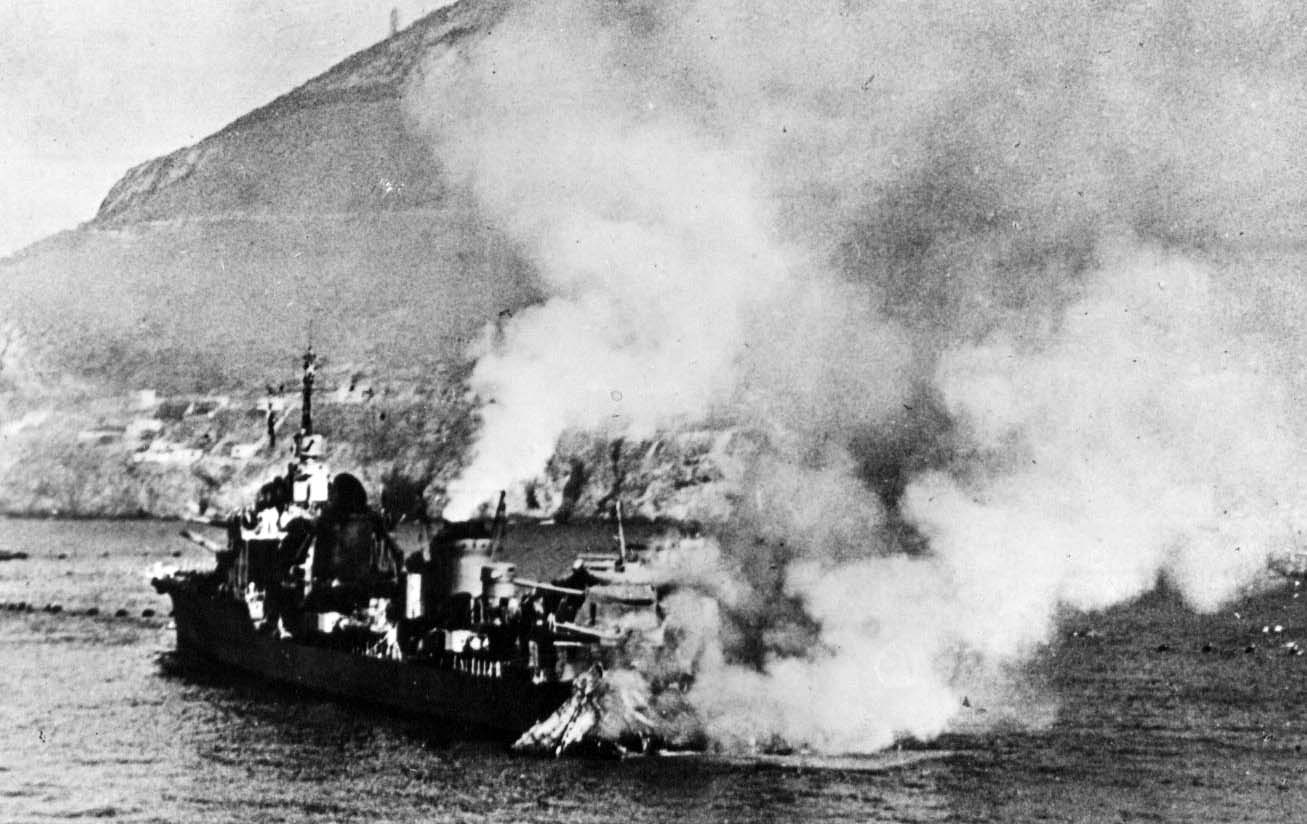
Mogador immediately after the attack on 3 July 1940

Mogador was present during the British attack on Mers-el-Kébir on 3 July 1940 and was severely damaged by a hit from an armour-piercing 15-inch (38 cm) shell in the rear hull that detonated her ready depth charges although it failed to detonate itself. The explosion destroyed her upper rear hull, but, miraculously, the rear magazines failed to explode. 38 men were killed, the port propeller shaft was damaged and a blade from the starboard propeller was shattered. She was towed to Oran for repairs and dry docked on 17 July where the remains of her No. 4 turret were removed and the after bulkheads repaired and reinforced to make her seaworthy. She sailed for Toulon on 1 December where she was docked pending reconstruction.

The rebuilding was slowed by material shortages and she wasn't taken into hand by the shipyard Forges et Chantiers de la Mediterranée at La Seyne-sur-Mer until late February 1942. In October it was estimated that she wouldn't be completed until July 1943. She was scuttled in La Seyne-sur-Mer on 27 November 1942 to prevent her capture by the Germans. The ship was refloated by the Italians on 5 April 1943, but not repaired. Mogador was sunk by Allied bombers in late 1944, but was raised in 1949 and scrapped.
