= French destroyer Volta =

French Navy's Mogador-class destroyer

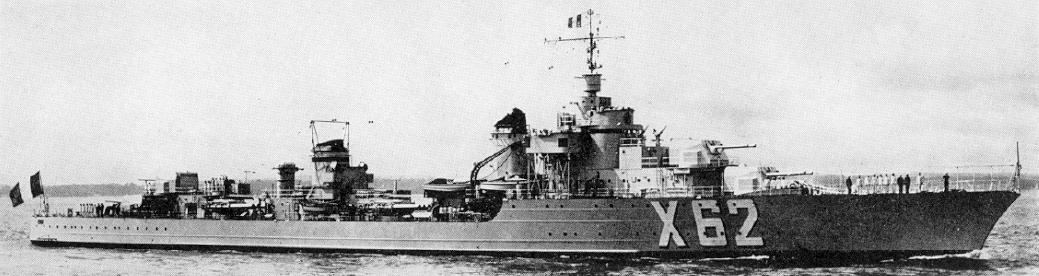
- Volta

History

France
- Name: Volta
- Namesake: Volta River
- Builder: Ateliers et Chantiers de Bretagne Nantes
- Laid down: 24 December 1934
- Launched: 26 November 1936
- Commissioned: 6 March 1939
- Fate: Scuttled, 27 November 1942, raised in 1943 by Italy, scrapped in 1948

General characteristics
- Class & type: Mogador-class destroyer
- Displacement: 2,997 t (2,950 long tons) (standard)
- Length: 137.5 m (451 ft 1 in)
- Beam: 12.57 m (41 ft 3 in)
- Draft: 4.74 m (15 ft 7 in)
- Installed power: 4 water-tube boilers; 92,000 shp (69,000 kW)
- Propulsion: 2 shafts; 2 geared steam turbines
- Speed: 39 knots (72 km/h; 45 mph)
- Range: 4,345 nmi (8,047 km; 5,000 mi) at 15 knots (28 km/h; 17 mph)
- Complement: 12 officers, 226 men
- Armament: 4 × twin 138.6 mm (5.5 in) guns; 2 × single 37 mm (1.5 in) AA guns; 2 × twin 13.2 mm (0.52 in) AA guns; 2 × triple, 2 × twin 550 mm (22 in) torpedo tubes; 32 depth charges and up to 40 naval mines

Volta was a Mogador-class destroyer (contre-torpilleur) of the French Navy. Named for the West African river, she was built before the outbreak of World War II and was the penultimate contre-torpilleur built by the French Navy. Along with her sister ship Mogador, Volta was designed in an effort to build a ship capable of out-fighting every other ship below her tonnage. Arguably the design was less than successful, as it possessed the armament of a light cruiser on the hull of a destroyer. The two ships of the class have been described as having pushed the contre-torpilleur concept beyond "the limits of its capabilities".

During Volta's service, she saw only limited action. Following the outbreak of the war, she took part in convoy escort duties initially before being withdrawn to Brest for refit. On 3 July 1940, when the British attacked the French fleet at Mers-el-Kébir, Volta managed to escape without damage and sought refuge in Toulon. When the Germans tried to seize her along with the rest of the fleet on 27 November 1942, however, she was scuttled in Toulon Harbour by her crew to prevent her from being captured.

== Design and description ==
Volta had an overall length of 137.5 meters (451 ft 1 in), a beam of 12.57 meters (41 ft 3 in), and a maximum draft of 4.74 meters (15 ft 7 in). She displaced 2,997 metric tons (2,950 long tons) at standard load and 4,018 metric tons (3,955 long tons) at deep load. Her Rateau-Bretagne geared steam turbines were designed to produce 92,000 shaft horsepower (68,604 kW), which would propel the ship at 39 knots (72 km/h; 45 mph). However, during sea trials in February 1938, Volta's turbines provided 108,424 shp (80,852 kW) and she reached 41.67 knots (77.17 km/h; 47.95 mph) at a deep displacement of 3,731 metric tons (3,672 long tons). The ship carried 360 metric tons (354 long tons) of fuel oil at normal load and an additional 350 metric tons (340 long tons) at deep load.

Volta carried eight 138.6 mm (5.5 in) Canon de 138 mm Modèle 1929 guns in four twin electrically powered gun turrets, one superfiring pair fore and aft of the superstructure. Her anti-aircraft armament consisted of two 37 mm (1.5 in) Mle 1933 guns in a single mount positioned on the rear deck house forward of the rear turrets. She also mounted four 13.2 mm (0.52 in) Mle 1929 heavy machine guns in two twin mounts located between the forward superstructure and the forward guns. Volta carried 10 above-water 550-millimeter (22 in) tubes: a pair of triple mounts between the funnels and a pair of double mounts aft of the rear funnel. A pair of depth charge chutes were built into Volta's stern; these housed a total of 16 Guirard depth charges. Mine rails were fitted on the rear deck that had a maximum capacity of 40 mines.

The ship's greatest weakness was her "inability to generate sufficient electric current to power the multitude of auxiliary motors on which their advanced machinery and complex gun mountings were dependent. Many of the auxiliary motors themselves were also seriously underpowered, particularly the servomotors for the gun mountings (which were slow to train and elevate) and for the rudder (which contributed to the ship's poor maneuverability."

== Service history ==
Volta, with her sister Mogador, comprised the 6th Large Destroyer Division (French: 6^{e} Division de contre-torpilleurs) and was assigned to the Force de Raid based at Brest when the war began. This group's purpose was to hunt German blockade runners and raiders and to escort convoys that might be in danger from the same. From 21–30 October 1939 the Force de Raide escorted the KJ.4 convoy to protect it against the heavy cruiser Deutschland which had sortied into the North Atlantic before the war began. A sortie by the battleships Gneisenau and Scharnhorst into the North Atlantic on 21 November prompted the Force de Raide to sail from Brest to rendezvous with the British battlecruiser HMS Hood and patrol the area south of Iceland, but the German ships were able to return safely under the cover of heavy weather without being engaged.

Volta was refitted at Brest between January and May 1940 and a number of minor changes were made. The necessary improvements identified for the main armament during her sea trials a year earlier were finally implemented, the canvas cover for the back of the turrets was replaced by a rolling door, new radios were installed, and shields were fitted to the anti-aircraft machine guns and the searchlights. A SS-6 sonar was fitted in June 1940, but proved to be ineffectual.

On 3 July 1940, following the Fall of France, Volta was at Mers-el-Kébir when the British attacked the French fleet in an effort to destroy the French fleet in order to prevent it from being captured by the Germans. Despite the attack, Volta fired 88 shells at a British destroyer—a performance rated by her gunnery officer as her best up to that point—before managing to escape to Toulon in the company of the battleship Strasbourg and a number of other destroyers.

After the Armistice with Germany in June 1940, the French Navy decided to increase the anti-aircraft strength of the Mogador-class destroyers and installed two 13.2 mm Browning machine guns on platforms attached to the sides of the No. 3 gun mount in December 1940 – January 1941. This was a version of the American .50 caliber M2 Browning re-chambered to use the standard French 13.2 mm ammunition and with its rate of fire increased to 1000 rounds per minute. It was fed from 1000-round flexible belts, but had no greater range than the older Hotchkiss machine guns already fitted on Volta. Plans were made at the same time to replace the Hotchkiss machine guns with another twin 37 mm Mle 1933 mount and another pair of Brownings, but a shortage of weapons prevented this plan from being fulfilled. However eight 7.5 mm Darne machine guns were fitted, more for the crew's morale benefit than any real usefulness, and more OPL 1 meter (3.3 ft) rangefinders were fitted at the aft end of the centre deck house to improve coverage of the rear sky arcs and to increase the number of aerial targets that could be engaged.

In the autumn of 1941 the mitrailleuse de 25 mm contre-aéroplanes Modèle 1940, a naval adaptation of an Army anti-aircraft gun, became available. So Volta was modified between August and November 1941 with two single 25 mm guns where the Hotchkiss machine guns had been mounted. Their platform was widened and one additional Browning machine gun was added on each side of the platform. The Hotchkiss guns were moved to the upper deck on either side of the after deck house. A degaussing cable was added during this same refit. Later in the year the SS 6 sonar was scheduled to be replaced by a French copy of the British ASDIC, but it was still sitting on the dockside when Volta was scuttled in Toulon Harbour when the Germans tried to seize the fleet on 27 November 1942 to prevent it from defecting to the Allies. She was raised on 20 May 1943 by the Italians, but no effort was made to repair her. Volta was bombed and sunk on 24 November 1943 and 19 May 1944 by bombers of the Fifteenth Air Force and later refloated and scrapped in 1948.
