= Mogador-class destroyer =

French destroyer class

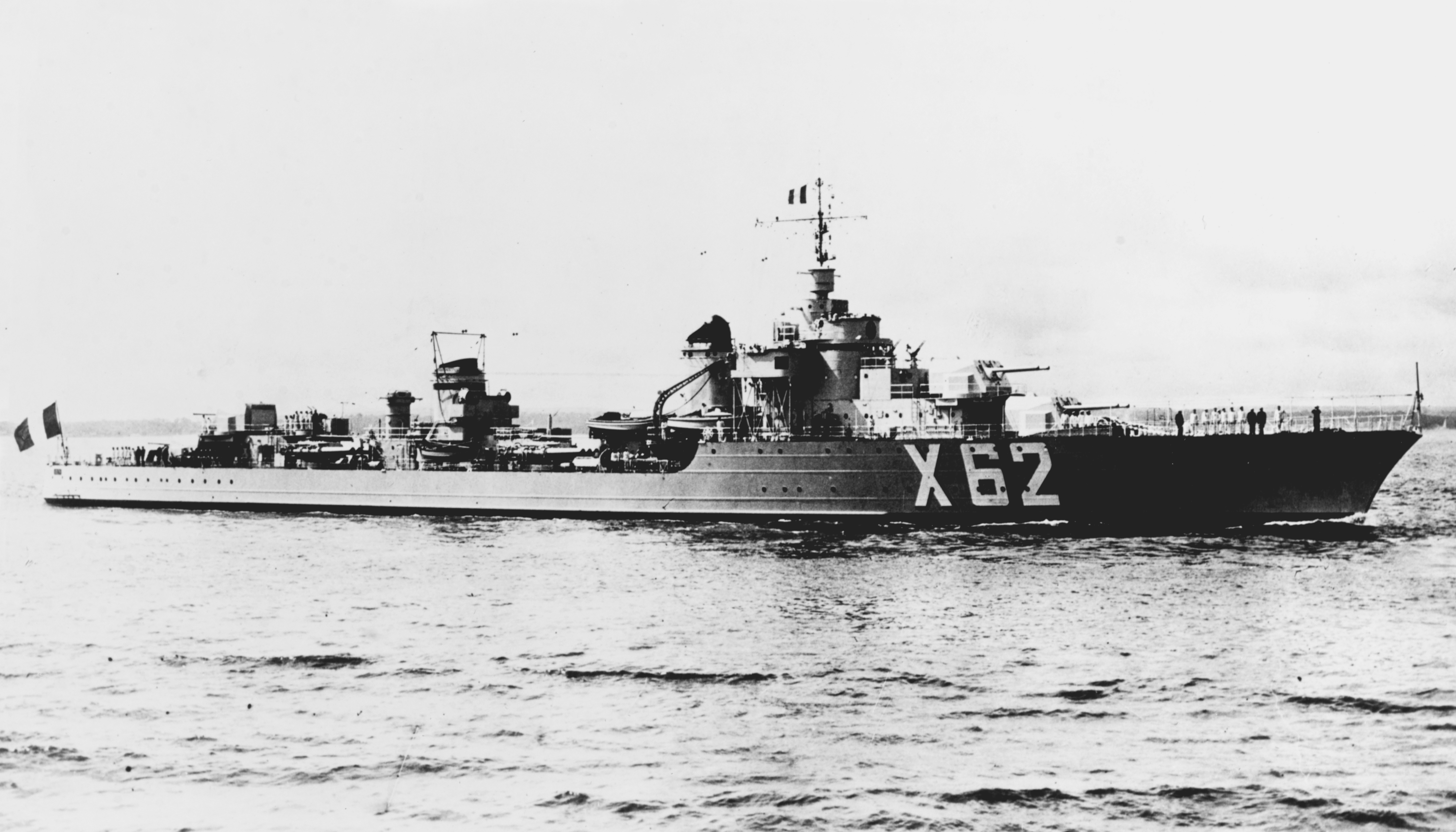
- Volta underway off Portsmouth on 8 August 1939

Class overview
- Name: Mogador-class destroyer
- Builders: Arsenal de Lorient; Ateliers et Chantiers de Bretagne
- Operators: French Navy
- Preceded by: Le Fantasque class
- Succeeded by: T 47 class
- Planned: 6
- Completed: 2
- Lost: 2

General characteristics
- Type: Large destroyer
- Displacement: 2,997 t (2,950 long tons) (standard); 4,018 t (3,955 long tons) (deep load)
- Length: 137.5 m (451 ft 1 in)
- Beam: 12.57 m (41 ft 3 in)
- Draft: 4.74 m (15 ft 7 in)
- Installed power: 4 × Indret boilers; 92,000 shp (69,000 kW)
- Propulsion: 2 × shafts; 2 × geared steam turbines
- Speed: 39 knots (72 km/h; 45 mph)
- Range: 4,345 nmi (8,047 km; 5,000 mi) at 15 knots (28 km/h; 17 mph)
- Complement: 12 officers, 226 men
- Armament: 4 × twin 138.6 mm (5.46 in) guns; 2 × single 37 mm (1.5 in) AA guns; 2 × twin 13.2 mm (0.52 in) AA machine guns; 2 × double + 2 × triple 550 mm (21.7 in) torpedo tubes; 32 depth charges; 40 mines

The Mogador-class large destroyers (contre-torpilleurs) of the French Navy were laid down in 1935 and commissioned in 1939. They were extremely fast, very large destroyers intended to act as scouts for the two fast Dunkerque-class battleships. The design evolved from the extremely fast Le Fantasque class, being 300 tons heavier and carrying eight guns in semi-enclosed twin turrets rather than five guns in single open mounts. With their eight 138.6 mm (5.46 in) guns they approached a light cruiser in firepower.

Both Mogador and her sister Volta were present during the British attack on Mers-el-Kébir on 3 July 1940, but only Volta managed to escape to Toulon. Mogador was struck by a 15-inch (38 cm) shell in the rear hull that detonated her ready depth charges despite not actually detonating itself. This destroyed most of her stern above water, but she remained afloat and was repaired enough to be sent to Toulon on 1 November 1940 for reconstruction. Both ships were scuttled in Toulon Harbour when the Germans tried to seize them on 27 November 1942.

== Design ==
Right-elevation line drawing of Mogador

The Mogador class was authorized in the 1932 Estimates as an improved version of the Le Fantasque class with three new twin mounts carrying the same Canon de 138 mm Modèle 1929 gun as the earlier ships, but construction was suspended for a period while France and Italy negotiated some limits on their fleets and because the shipyards were already at full capacity. During this pause time was taken to modify the design to deal with the severe weather and conditions of the North Atlantic and to incorporate developments in propulsion technology that indicated that a larger hull could be used without any requiring any increase in weight. After a proposal for a catapult was abandoned because of insufficient reserve stability, an extra twin turret was decided upon to boost the ship's firepower. Volta was authorized in the 1934 Estimates together with the second Dunkerque-class battleship.

=== General characteristics ===
Their construction was strengthened to handle the severe weather conditions of the North Atlantic as one of the requirements for their intended role as scouts and escorts for the Dunkerque-class battleships of the Force de Raid. Longitudinal construction was used throughout with frames spaced 1.8 metres (5.9 ft) apart and subdivided by twelve transverse compartments. Stress-bearing parts of the hull used 60 kg/m^{2} grade steel while the remainder of the hull used 50 kg/m^{2} grade steel. To save weight all internal partitions used Duralumin as did the sides of the superstructure. The hull was entirely riveted, but all other joints were welded. Despite these efforts, top-weight was higher than on earlier classes of contre-torpilleurs because of the weight of the twin-gun turrets.

Accommodations were even more cramped and poorly ventilated than earlier ships because the ammunition hoists passed through the crew spaces, a problem for ships intended for long-endurance sorties into the North Atlantic. The lack of room in the hull forced a number of workshops and offices into the superstructure which added more weight high in the ship. There were three deckhouses abaft the break in the forecastle with intervals between them to permit the beam torpedo tubes to rotate, but these were no larger than in earlier ships which meant that space was at a premium.

The ships proved to be excellent sea-boats and were very capable in high seas as they could sustain 34 knots (63 km/h; 39 mph) in Sea State 4. "They were very steady ships, with a gentle roll period of seven seconds; they heeled only 2-3° with a strong cross-wind, and at only 7-8° at full rudder — a marked improvement over earlier contre-torpilleurs. Their comparatively high length to beam ratio, however, gave them a high coefficient of inertia, which made maneuvers in formation difficult."

=== Propulsion ===
Schema of machinery

The Mogador-class ships retained the unit arrangement of their propulsion spaces used in earlier contre-torpilleurs. They used a new high-pressure Indret boiler rated at 3,500 kilopascals (510 psi). While this gave more power for its weight and size, it proved to be fragile and difficult to maintain. Each set of Rateau-Bretagne geared turbines was rated at 46,000 shaft horsepower (34,000 kW) and consisted of four main turbines, a high-pressure, a medium-pressure and two low-pressure with a reversing turbine in each of the main low-pressure turbine cases. There were also two small cruise turbines operating in parallel in each engine room. At low speeds, steam was directed to the cruise turbines, but at higher speeds it was diverted to the high-pressure turbine. At 25 knots (46 km/h; 29 mph) the cruise turbines were decoupled entirely using a Vulcan clutch. This didn't work properly and several ship's captains recommended that the cruise turbines be deleted from future classes entirely. Each of the two shafts was driven by single reduction gearing. The port shaft was driven by the rear engine room and was significantly shorter than the starboard shaft which was driven by the forward engine room. This caused a significant disparity between the turning circle, depending on which direction the ship was turning.

Each shaft drove a three-bladed screw propeller that was 3.94 m (12.9 ft) in diameter. They suffered from severe cavitation at speed. The single semi-balanced rudder was chosen to reduce high speed resistance. It had an area of only 14.95 square metres (160.9 sq ft) and was moved by a weak steam-driven servomotor. On trials, the turning circle was measured at 800–850 metres (870–930 yd) at 25 knots (46 km/h; 29 mph). In service it took 25–30 seconds to turn the rudder to its maximum 32° at speed and the ship's turning circle was approximately double that demonstrated on trials. The ships were so unhandy that the captain of the Volta cautioned in his log that "great care was needed when operating in company with the battleship Strasbourg, because the latter ship was far more maneuverable."

The Mogador-class ships were designed for a speed of 39 knots (72 km/h; 45 mph), but this was comfortably exceeded on trials when Mogador achieved a top speed of 43.45 knots (80.47 km/h; 50.00 mph) from 118,320 shp (88,230 kW) for one hour. This was at "Washington" standard displacement so her earlier performance of 41.67 knots (77.17 km/h; 47.95 mph) with 108,424 shp (80,852 kW) at a load displacement of 3,731 tonnes (3,672 long tons; 4,113 short tons) was even more impressive.

At normal displacement they carried only 120 tonnes (120 long tons; 130 short tons) of oil, but carried 360 tonnes (350 long tons; 400 short tons) of oil at normal load and 710 tonnes (700 long tons; 780 short tons) at deep load. Endurance was estimated during their trials at 4,345 nautical miles (8,047 km; 5,000 mi) at a speed of 15 knots (28 km/h; 17 mph) using the cruise turbines and 2,664 nmi (4,934 km; 3,066 mi) at a speed of 24 knots (44 km/h; 28 mph) with the main turbines. This was never attained during service because the consumption by the auxiliary machinery was underestimated.

Arguably the greatest weakness of these ships lay in their inability to generate sufficient electric current to power the multitude of auxiliary motors on which their advanced machinery and complex gun mountings were dependent. Their DC electrical supply was only 115 V, whereas larger cruisers with power-operated turrets had a 230 V system. Electrical power was generated by two Alsthom turbo-generators rated at only 120 kW with two small diesel generators rated at 44/52 kW for use when the ship was alongside. The latter provided only for the ship's minimum lighting and electricity needs, and fires had to be lit in at least one of the boilers in order to train the turrets or elevate the guns for practice or maintenance. Many of the auxiliary motors themselves were also seriously underpowered, particularly the servomotors for the gun mountings (which were slow to train and elevate) and for the rudder which contributed to the ship's poor maneuverability. In technological terms Mogador and Volta were ships with the armament of a light cruiser in the hull of a destroyer; the contre-torpilleur as a type had been pushed past the limits of its capabilities.

–Jordan, The Contre-Torpilleurs of the Mogador Class, p. 59

== Armament ==
=== Main guns ===
The Mogador-class ships were designed to use four newly designed twin-gun Modèle 1934 "pseudo-turrets" that used the same Canon de 138 mm Modèle 1929 as the preceding Le Fantasque-class destroyers. The guns were housed in separate cradles that could be coupled together and could elevate to a maximum of 30° and depress 10°. The underpowered electric motors gave a maximum training speed of 10° per second and a maximum elevating speed of 14° per second. The motors were initially installed within the mountings, but were moved to the outer sides of the turrets to free up room inside the turrets.

The pusher-type ammunition hoists ran up a fixed shaft in the center of the mount. The shells and their powder charges were transferred to a tipping drum that was rotated to match the bearing angle of the guns and then loaded. This system was adapted from that used for the fixed 130-millimeter (5.1 in) ammunition used in the Hardi-class destroyers. Unfortunately it was not well suited for separate-loading ammunition. Each gun had its own separate shell and powder hoist, for a total of four hoists. The tipping drum had four matching separate trays to move the ammunition to the gun. Each shell was power-rammed, but the propellant charges had to be hand-rammed. Theoretically the guns could be loaded at any angle, but the power rammer was so weak that it could not ram shells at angles above 10°. This problem, coupled with the "poor quality of manufacture of the guns, the unsatisfactory profile of the breech, resulted in a firing cycle of only 3-4 rounds per minute during the early trials with jams and failures frequent", rather than the planned 10 rounds per minute. A further problem was that there only two loaders assigned to the gun crew; they tired quickly during prolonged firing.

Gunnery trials were conducted when Volta was on her sea trials in mid-1939 and were "an unmitigated disaster" for the reasons given above. Some fixes were identified, notably modifications to the breech, installation of split loading trays and reinforcement of the catapult rammers, but they had to wait until the ships' next refit to be implemented. But even these modifications were only stop gaps and an entirely new loading system was deemed necessary, but since this was expected to take 10–12 months to develop the current system would have to be used in the meantime. Both Volta and Mogador were refitted in January 1940 and had their turrets modified, although loading still could not be done at angles higher than 10°. The surrender of France in June 1940 ended any work on a new loading system. Five-round ready racks for each gun were added to the sides of the turrets during the refit to compensate for any problems with the loading systems. The magazines were designed to store 1440 138 mm shells, 180 rounds per gun, plus there was a separate magazine for 85 starshells which supplied turret Nr. 2.

=== Anti-aircraft suite ===
A single 37-millimeter (1.5 in) twin-gun Modèle 1933 anti-aircraft mount was installed on the rearmost deckhouse forward of turret Nr. 3. It used the 50-caliber semi-automatic 37 mm (1.5 in) gun. It had a conventional sliding breech and used six-round cartridge boxes which gave it a maximum rate of fire of only 30-40 rounds per minute. This mount was used in lieu of the intended power-driven Modèle 1935 twin-gun mount which was to use a new 48-caliber, fully automatic 37 mm gun that was expected to be able to fire at a rate of 165 rounds per minute, but the new gun was still in development when the ships were commissioned. 250 rounds were stored near the mount, but the main magazine, which held an additional 1,250 rounds, was adjacent to the forward 138 mm magazines. This required a loader to move forward 50 metres (55 yd) to pick up each 12.8-kilogram (28 lb) cartridge box and carry it back to the waiting gun crew.

Two twin 13.2-millimeter (0.52 in) Hotchkiss machine gun mounts were fitted as anti-strafing weapons. These had a high rate of fire at 450 rpm, but this was hampered by the awkward 30-round magazine feed. Initially they were mounted on each side of the forward superstructure at deck level and fitted with gun shields to protect them against the spray. Trials revealed the limitations of these positions with poor arcs of fire and the gun shields obstructed the aimer's view of the target. Following the completion of the trials the guns were relocated to a new deckhouse between the bridge and turret Nr. 2 and their gun shields removed. 2500 rounds per barrel were stored in the forward magazines.

=== Underwater weapons ===
The Mogador-class ships were designed for anti-surface warfare rather than anti-submarine work and they were given a large torpedo battery in consequence. Two triple Modèle 1928T torpedo launchers were fitted on each beam between the funnels and two twin Modèle 1928D launchers were located on the beam, abaft the second funnel. The placement of each launcher on the beam significantly increased each launcher's arc of fire (25° to 150°) in comparison to the Le Fantasque's centerline mount (60°-100°). However this was not without cost as her torpedo broadside was weaker by one tube than the older class, but the extra launchers positioned close to the ship's side imposed, more importantly, a weight and stability penalty.

All of her mounts used the 550-millimeter (22 in) Modèle 1923DT torpedo with a 308 kg (679 lb) warhead. This 2,068 kg (4,559 lb) torpedo used a four-cylinder, radial Brotherhood alcohol engine to power it at two set speeds. The fast speed was 39 knots (72 km/h; 45 mph) to a range of 9,000 metres (9,800 yd) while the slow speed setting was 35 knots (65 km/h; 40 mph) to a range of 13,000 metres (14,000 yd).

Twin depth charge tunnels were built into the rear hull of the Mogador-class ships. Each tunnel housed eight Guirard depth charges, with another sixteen stowed in the rear magazine. They were launched by remote control in patterns of four using a chain system. Since no sonar equipment was fitted these depth charges were unlikely to actually damage a submarine.

Fixed pairs of mine rails were mounted above the stern and each pair could carry five Bréguet B4 mines. These could be extended using removable section stowed between decks to carry another thirty mines if necessary.

=== Fire control ===
The centralized fire-control system was similar to that of the Le Fantasque-class with 12 × 72 target-designation binoculars on each side of the bridge linked by Granat transmitters to the directors located atop the bridge and abaft the second funnel. Each director had a 5-metre (16 ft 5 in) OPL Modèle 1935 stereoscopic rangefinder and sent the range to the post central artillerie where it was fed into a modernized Modèle 1929 electro-mechanical computer which calculated the firing solution and transmitted it to the turrets. The turrets could also be controlled locally if necessary.

The torpedo-control system was much the same, although entirely separate from the gunnery system. 8 × 30 target-designation binoculars were mounted on each side of the bridge and transmitted the target's bearing to the torpedo director located above the primary gunnery director above the bridge. It used a separate 5-metre OPL Modèle 1935 stereoscopic rangefinder to provide the bearing and range to a Modèle 1933 electro-mechanical computer which calculated the torpedo firing angle. This was sent to the remotely controlled torpedo tubes, and the command to fire could be given by either the torpedo director or either of the secondary positions on the wings of the bridge.

== Construction ==
This class only consisted of Mogador (X61) and Volta (X62). Steel was cut on both contre-torpilleurs beginning in late 1934, Mogador at the Arsenal de Lorient, Lorient and Volta at Ateliers et Chantiers de Bretagne, Nantes, although assembly did not begin until the autumn of the following year. Industrial unrest disrupted their construction and it was not until January 1938 that Mogador was handed over to the French Navy for sea trials. Volta followed three months later. However, neither ship was formally accepted by the French Navy for another year. Mogador was not commissioned (clotûre d'armament) until 8 April 1939 and Volta on 6 March 1939.

Four improved Mogador-class ships were ordered in 1939 to be named Kléber, Desaix, Hoche and Marceau, but their construction was suspended due to the start of World War II. Their design was continually modified in light of wartime experience, but the original plan for dual-purpose 130 mm (5.1 in) guns had to be shelved when it became apparent that they could not be developed in a timely manner, and they reverted to the main armament of the Mogadors. The anti-aircraft armament was reinforced with the substitution of four 100 mm (3.9 in) anti-aircraft guns for the single twin 37 mm mount. But these plans came to nought when France surrendered in June 1940.

== History ==
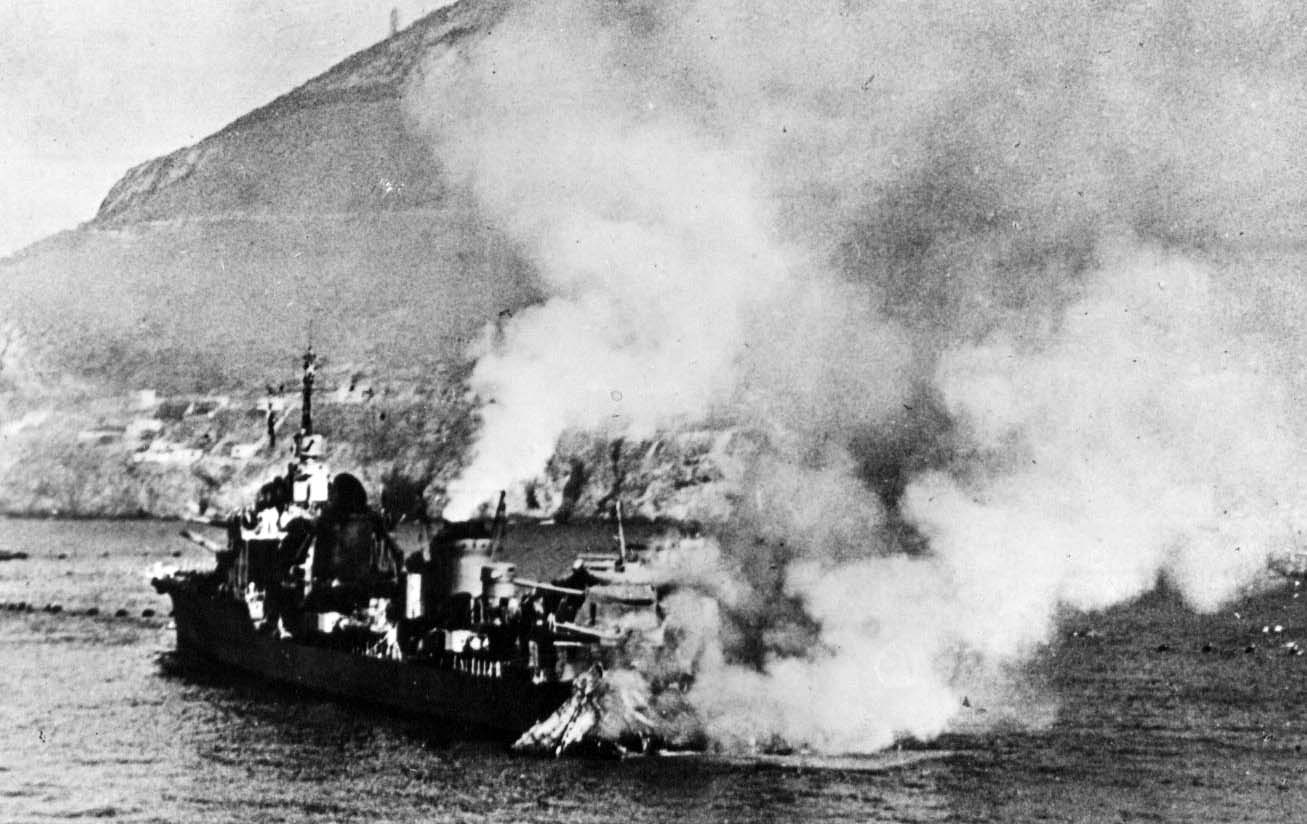
Mogador damaged at Mers-el-Kébir after being hit in the rear hull

Mogador and Volta comprised the 6th Large Destroyer Division (6^{e} Division de contre-torpilleurs) and were assigned to the Force de Raid based at Brest when the war began. This group's purpose was to hunt German blockade runners and raiders and to escort convoys that might be in danger from the same. From 21 to 30 October 1939 the Force de Raid escorted the KJ.4 convoy to protect it against the Deutschland which had sortied into the North Atlantic before the war began. A sortie by the German battleships Gneisenau and Scharnhorst into the North Atlantic on 21 November prompted the Force de Raid to sail from Brest to rendezvous with the British battlecruiser HMS Hood and patrol the area south of Iceland, but the German ships were able to return safely under the cover of heavy weather without being engaged.

Both ships were refitted in early 1940 and a number of minor changes were made. The necessary improvements identified for the main armament during their sea trials a year earlier were finally implemented, the canvas cover for the back of the turrets was replaced by a rolling door, new radios were installed, and shields were fitted to the anti-aircraft machine guns and the searchlights. A SS-6 sonar was fitted in June 1940, but proved to be ineffectual.

During the British attack on Mers-el-Kébir on 3 July 1940, Mogador was severely damaged by a hit from a 15-inch (38 cm) shell in the rear hull that detonated her ready depth charges. Volta was also present, but managed to escape in company with the battleship Strasbourg and other ships. Mogador was repaired enough to reach Toulon several months later, but was still undergoing repairs and modifications in Toulon in November 1942. Both Mogador and Volta were scuttled in Toulon Harbour on 27 November 1942 to prevent their capture by Germany. Both were refloated in 1943 by the Italians, but neither was repaired and both were eventually broken up.
