= Le Fantasque-class destroyer =

Class of large French naval ships

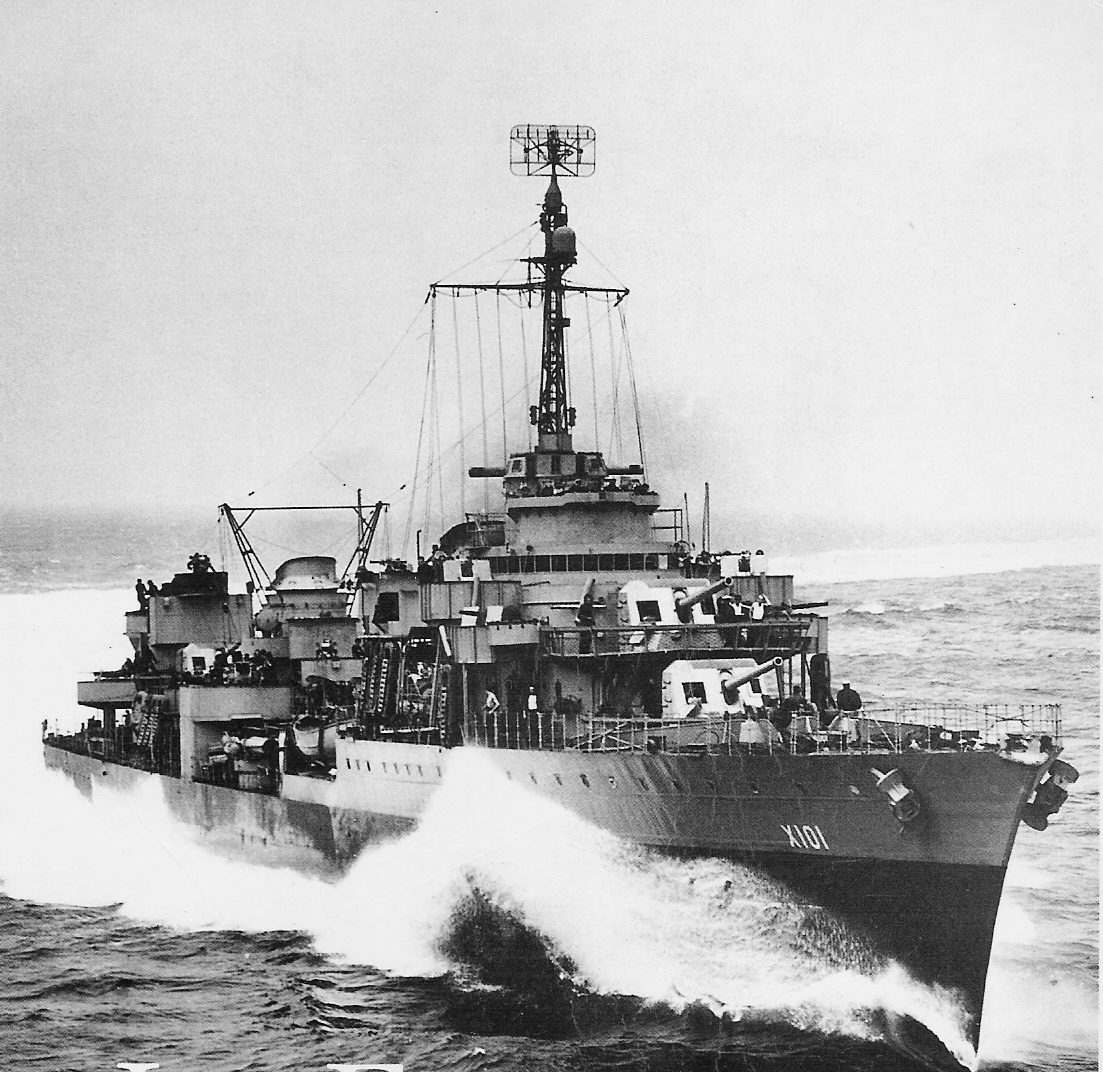
- Le Fantasque, on trials after re-fitting, in Casco Bay, Maine, on 13 June 1943.

Class overview
- Name: Le Fantasque class
- Operators: French Navy; Free French Naval Forces
- Preceded by: Vauquelin class
- Succeeded by: Mogador class
- Completed: 6
- Lost: 2
- Retired: 4

General characteristics (as built)
- Type: Destroyer
- Displacement: 2,569 t (2,528 long tons) (standard); 3,417 t (3,363 long tons) (deep load)
- Length: 132.4 m (434 ft 5 in)
- Beam: 12 m (39 ft 4 in)
- Draft: 4.5 m (14 ft 9 in)
- Installed power: 4 water-tube boilers; 74,000 PS (54,000 kW; 73,000 shp)
- Propulsion: 2 shafts; 2 geared steam turbines
- Speed: 37 knots (69 km/h; 43 mph) (designed)
- Range: 2,900 nmi (5,400 km; 3,300 mi) at 15 knots (28 km/h; 17 mph)
- Complement: 11 officers, 254 sailors (wartime)
- Armament: 5 × single 138.6 mm (5.5 in) guns; 2 × single 37 mm (1.5 in) AA guns; 2 × twin 13.2 mm (0.52 in) AA machine guns; 3 × triple 550 mm (21.7 in) torpedo tubes; 2 × chutes for 28 depth charges; 40 × mines

The Le Fantasque class of six large, very fast destroyers was ordered under the French naval programme of 1930. They served in World War II for Vichy France and the Free French Forces.

== Design and description ==
The Le Fantasque-class ships were designed to counter the fast Italian Condottieri-class light cruisers, and one member of the class, Le Terrible, exceeded 45 knots (83 km/h; 52 mph) during trials to set a world record for a conventionally-hulled ship. They had an overall length of 132.4 meters (434 ft 5 in), a beam of 12 meters (39 ft 4 in), and a draft of 4.5 meters (14 ft 9 in). The ships displaced 2,569 metric tons (2,528 long tons) at standard and 3,417 metric tons (3,363 long tons) at deep load. The crew of the Le Fantasque class consisted of 11 officers and 221 crewmen in peacetime and the number of the latter increasing to 254 in wartime.

The ships were powered by two geared Rateau-Breguet or Parsons steam turbines, each driving one three-bladed 3.8-meter (12 ft 6 in) propeller, using steam provided by four water-tube boilers with superheaters that operated at a pressure of 27 kg/cm^{2} (2,648 kPa; 384 psi) and a temperature of 325 °C (617 °F). The turbines were designed to produce 74,000 metric horsepower (54,000 kW; 73,000 shp) which was intended give the ships a speed of 37 knots (69 km/h; 43 mph). During their sea trials, each of the ships greatly exceeded their designed speed, ranging from 41.4 to 45.1 knots (76.7 to 83.5 km/h; 47.6 to 51.9 mph) from 94,353 to 98,529 PS (69,397 to 72,468 kW; 93,062 to 97,181 shp). They carried a maximum of 640 metric tons (630 long tons) of fuel oil which gave them a range of 2,700 or 2,900 nautical miles (5,000 or 5,400 km; 3,100 or 3,300 mi) at 15 knots (28 km/h; 17 mph); the Parsons-equipped ships were more economical. The ships were fitted with two 80-kilowatt (110 hp) turbo generators in the engine rooms. In addition, a pair of 22-kilowatt (30 hp) diesel generators were located in the aft engine room.

=== Armament and fire control ===
The main armament of the Le Fantasques consisted of five 50-caliber Canon de 138 mm (5.4 in) Modèle 1929 guns in single shielded mounts, one superfiring pair fore and aft of the superstructure and the fifth gun abaft the aft funnel. Their mounts had a range of elevation from −10° to +30°, which gave the guns a range of 20,000 meters (22,000 yd) at maximum elevation. They fired 39.9–40.2-kilogram (88–89 lb) projectiles at a muzzle velocity of 800 m/s (2,600 ft/s) at a rate of 8 to 12 rounds per minute. The Le Fantasques could stow 200 rounds for each gun, plus 75 star shells.

Their anti-aircraft (AA) armament consisted of two 50-caliber semi-automatic 37-millimeter (1.5 in) Modèle 1925 AA guns in single mounts positioned amidships. Their mounts could elevate from −15° to +80° and the guns had a maximum effective range of 5,000 meters (5,500 yd). Firing 0.73-kilogram (1.6 lb) projectiles at a rate of fire of 20 rounds per minute. There were two twin-gun mounts for Hotchkiss Mitrailleuse de 13.2-millimeter (0.52 in) CA Modèle 1929 AA machine guns aft of the 37 mm mounts.

The ships carried three above-water triple sets of 550-millimeter (21.7 in) torpedo tubes; the aft mount could traverse to both sides, but the forward mounts were positioned one on each broadside. Their Mle 1923DT torpedoes had a 415-kilogram (915 lb) TNT warhead and could be set for a speed of 39 knots (72 km/h; 45 mph) with a range of 9,000 meters (9,800 yd) or 35 knots (65 km/h; 40 mph) for 13,000 meters (14,000 yd). A pair of depth charge chutes were built into their stern; these housed a total of sixteen 200-kilogram (440 lb) depth charges with another dozen available in the torpedo magazine. The ships could be fitted with rails to drop forty 530-kilogram (1,170 lb) Breguet B4 mines.

Fire control for the main guns was provided by a Mle 1929 electro-mechanical fire-control computer that used data provided by a 5-meter (16 ft 5 in) OPL/SOM SJ.1 stereoscopic rangefinder atop the bridge. The Le Fantasque class ships were the first contre-torpilleurs to be fitted with a prototype remote-control gunnery system that was intended to automatically lay the guns on the target while compensating for the ship's motions. The electric motors were insufficiently sensitive and often overcompensated, while the circuit breakers for the elevation motors often tripped when trying to use the system while the ships were rolling heavily, taking the system off-line. A pair of 1-meter (3 ft 3 in) OPL Mle J.1930 high-angle stereoscopic rangefinders were mounted on the superstructure amidships to control the anti-aircraft guns.

=== Modifications ===
In late 1936 the Mle 1929 computers were upgraded and the high-angle rangefinders amidships were replaced by 1.5-meter (4 ft 11 in) OPL J4.1935 models during 1937. In December 1938 and April 1939, the Hotchkiss machine guns were transferred to newly built platforms on each side of the bridge and the OPL Mle J.1930 rangefinders formerly positioned amidships were installed on the bridge to control them. Development of the originally intended twin-gun mounts for the automatic 70-caliber Canon de 37 mm Modèle 1935 AA guns was completed three years late and they replaced the single-gun mounts between January and May 1940. Beginning in September the ships still in French hands were equipped with one or two Browning 13.2-millimeter anti-aircraft machine guns mounted on the quarterdeck. In 1941–1942 the quarterdeck guns were transferred to positions forward of the bridge and the Hotchkiss machine guns were repositioned on new platforms on the center superstructure. The ships had the aft superstructure remodeled at the same time to create a platform atop the aft ammunition hoists and platforms on each side for 37 mm guns. The twin-gun mounts was repositioned on the upper platform and one of the lower platforms while the other one was occupied by a single mount as there was a shortage of twin-gun mounts.

After the war began in September 1939, the depth-charge stowage aboard the Le Fantasques increased to 48. In addition the mine rails were replaced by a pair of rails for 35-kilogram (77 lb) depth charges. Each rail could accommodate 3 depth charges and 15 more were stored in the magazine. In 1942 the four undamaged ships still under Vichy French control were given Alpha-2 sonar systems in cases. Based on the British Type 128 Asdic system, they could not be installed until the hull was modified to accommodate the required flexible underwater dome which was scheduled for the following year.

==== In Free French service ====
Le Triomphant had been seized by the British in July 1940 and was turned over to the Free French. Later that year her aft superfiring 138.6 mm gun replaced by a British 4-inch (102 mm) Mk V AA gun and a Type 128 Asdic system was installed. The 35 kg depth charges and their rails were removed and the ship was fitted with four Modèle 1918 depth-charge throwers abreast the aft superstructure for 100-kilogram (220 lb) depth charges. During a subsequent refit in mid-1941, the Hotchkiss machine guns were relocated to positions on the forecastle deck and their former positions were occupied by single mounts for 2-pounder (40 mm (1.6 in)) Mk II AA guns. A quadruple mount for Hotchkiss machine guns taken from the battleship Paris was installed atop the aft superstructure and rails for British Mk VIIH depth charges were installed on the stern. A fixed antenna for a Type 286M search radar was also installed. A late 1942 refit in Australia exchanged the 13.2 mm machine guns for six 20-millimeter (0.8 in) Oerlikon light AA guns and the Type 286M radar was replaced by a Type 290 system with a rotating antenna.

While Le Triomphant was en route to the United States in 1944 for a comprehensive refit, its British Mk V AA gun was replaced by a 138.6 mm gun from L'Audacieux. The Americans installed SA early-warning, SF surface-search and a British Type 285 fire-control radar, removed her aft torpedo tubes to save weight and converted some boiler feedwater tanks to fuel oil to improve her range. Her AA armament had been removed earlier and now consisted of six 40-millimeter (1.6 in) Bofors guns in twin-gun mount and eleven Oerlikon guns in single mounts.

In early 1943 Le Terrible and Le Fantasque were similarly refitted in the United States although their anti-aircraft armament consisted of eight Bofors guns in one quadruple and two twin-gun mounts and eight Oerlikon guns in single mounts. After repairing damage suffered during the Naval Battle of Casablanca in November 1942 Le Malin followed her sisters to the United States and was similarly refitted. In 1944–1945, the supplies of the French 200 kg depth charges began to run out so the depth charge chutes were sealed off and rails for Mk VIIIH depth charges were added to those ships that lacked them. In December 1944, Le Malin had her worn-out Mle 1929 guns replaced by salvaged Mle 1927 guns.

== Ships ==
Construction data
Ship	Builder	Laid down	Launched	Completed	Fate
Le Fantasque	Arsenal de Lorient	16 November 1931	15 March 1934	10 March 1936	Scrapped, 1958
L'Audacieux	Arsenal de Lorient	16 November 1931	15 March 1934	27 November 1935	Sunk, 7 May 1943
Le Malin	Forges et Chantiers de la Méditerranée, La Seyne	16 November 1931	17 August 1933	1 May 1936	Scrapped, 1957
Le Terrible	Chantiers Navals Français, Caen Ateliers et Chantiers de la Loire, Saint-Nazaire	8 December 1931	30 November 1933	1 October 1935	Scrapped, 1963
Le Triomphant	Ateliers et Chantiers de France, Dunkirk	28 August 1931	16 April 1934	25 May 1936	Sold for scrap, 1957
L'Indomptable	Forges et Chantiers de la Méditerranée, La Seyne	25 January 1932	7 December 1933	10 February 1936	Scuttled in Toulon, 27 November 1942
