= Canon de 138 mm Modèle 1929 =

- Mle 1929 guns seen on Le Triomphant, 1940
- Type: Naval gun
- Place of origin: France

Service history
- In service: 1934–1954
- Used by: France
- Wars: World War II

Specifications
- Mass: 4,275 kilograms (9,425 lb) Mle 1929; 4,650 kilograms (10,250 lb) Mle 1934
- Length: 7.28 metres (23.9 ft)
- Barrel length: about 6.927 metres (22.73 ft)
- Shell: 130x900 mm R, separate-loading, cased charge
- Shell weight: 40.6 kilograms (90 lb)
- Caliber: 138.6 millimetres (5.46 in)
- Breech: semi-automatic, horizontal sliding-block
- Elevation: -10° to +30°
- Traverse: approximately 300°
- Rate of fire: depended on mount
- Muzzle velocity: 800 metres per second (2,600 ft/s)
- Maximum firing range: 20,000 metres (22,000 yd)

The Canon de 138 mm Modèle 1929 was a medium-calibre naval gun of the French Navy used during World War II. It was used on the large destroyers (contre-torpilleurs) of the Le Fantasque and Mogador classes.

== Description ==
The 50-caliber Mle 1929 was a lengthened version of the Modèle 1927. It used the semi-automatic action of the older gun as well as its horizontal sliding-block breech. It had an autofretted monobloc barrel as well. It weighed 4,275 kilograms (9,425 lb).

=== Mountings ===
==== Modèle 1929 ====
The Mle 1929 gun was used in single, hand-worked and trained, center-pivot mountings that weighed approximately 11.7 tonnes (11.5 long tons; 12.9 short tons) that were fitted with a 5 millimetres (0.20 in) thick gun shield. The mount could depress -10° and elevate to +30°, which gave it a maximum range of 20,000 metres (22,000 yd). Ammunition was brought up to the handling room by hoist from the magazines. From there the shells were transferred to the "guttering" (gouttières) which encircled the mount and allowed the shells to line up with the gun's breech regardless of the gun's angle of bearing. Powder cartridges were fed into similar center-line chutes. The gun had a nominal firing cycle of 4 or 5 seconds with its automatic spring rammer, but the dredger hoists transporting the shells and cartridge cases slowed the rate of fire down to 7 rounds per minute. This gun was only used on the large destroyers (contre-torpilleurs) of the Le Fantasque class.

==== Modèle 1934 ====
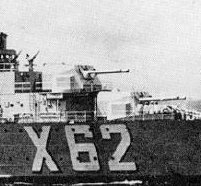
Twin-mounted Mle 1934 guns seen on Mogador, 1940

The Mle 1934 gun was installed in twin-gun, electrically powered Modèle 1934 base-ring "pseudo-turrets" that weighed 34.6 tonnes (34.1 long tons; 38.1 short tons) that were fitted with a 10 millimetres (0.39 in) thick, open-backed gunhouse. These were mounted on the large destroyers (contre-torpilleurs) of the Mogador class. The guns were housed in separate cradles that could be coupled together and could elevate to a maximum of 30° and depress 10°. The underpowered electric motors gave a maximum training speed of 10° per second and a maximum elevating speed of 14° per second. They were initially installed within the mountings, but were moved to the outer sides of the turrets to free up room.

The pusher-type ammunition hoists ran up a fixed shaft in the center of the mount. The shells and their powder charges were transferred to a tipping drum that was rotated to match the bearing angle of the guns and then loaded. This system was adapted from that used for the fixed 130 mm (5.1 in) ammunition used in the Le Hardi-class destroyers. Unfortunately it was not well suited for separate-loading ammunition. Each gun had its own separate shell and powder hoist, for a total of four hoists. The tipping drum had four matching separate trays to move the ammunition to the gun. Each shell was power-rammed, but the propellant charges had to be hand-rammed. Theoretically the guns could be loaded at any angle, but the power rammer was so weak that it could not ram shells at angles above 10°. This problem, coupled with the "poor quality of manufacture of the guns, the unsatisfactory profile of the breech, resulted in a firing cycle of only 3–4 rounds per minute during the early trials with jams and failures frequent", rather than the planned 10 rounds per minute. A further problem was that there were only two loaders assigned to the gun crew; they tired quickly during prolonged firing.

Gunnery trials were conducted when Volta was on her sea trials in mid-1939 and were "an unmitigated disaster" for the reasons given above. Some fixes were identified, notably modifications to the breech, installation of split loading trays and reinforcement of the catapult rammers, but they had to wait until the ships' next refit to be implemented. But even these modifications were only stop gaps and an entirely new loading system was deemed necessary, but since this was expected to take 10–12 months to develop the current system would have to be used. Both Volta and Mogador were refitted in January 1940 and had their turrets modified, although loading still could not be done at angles higher than 10°. The surrender of France in June 1940 ended any work on a new loading system. Five-round ready racks for each gun were added to the sides of the turrets during the refit to compensate for any problems with the loading systems.

=== Ammunition ===
The Mle 29 and Mle 34 primarily used two different shells, each propelled by 12.09 kilograms (26.7 lb) of BM 11 in a separate brass cartridge case. Beginning in January 1940 OPFK shells with dye markers were carried. These were intended to allow each ship to distinguish between its shell-bursts and those of other ships by use of coloured dyes. An illumination shell was also used, but details are unknown.

Shell name	Weight	Filling Weight	Muzzle velocity
OEA Modèle 1932 high-explosive	40.6 kg (90 lb)	4.1 kg (9.0 lb)	840 m/s (2,800 ft/s)
OPF Modèle 1924 semi-armour-piercing	40.6 kg (90 lb)	2.4 kg (5.3 lb)	800 m/s (2,600 ft/s)
