= French battleship Richelieu =

French battleship

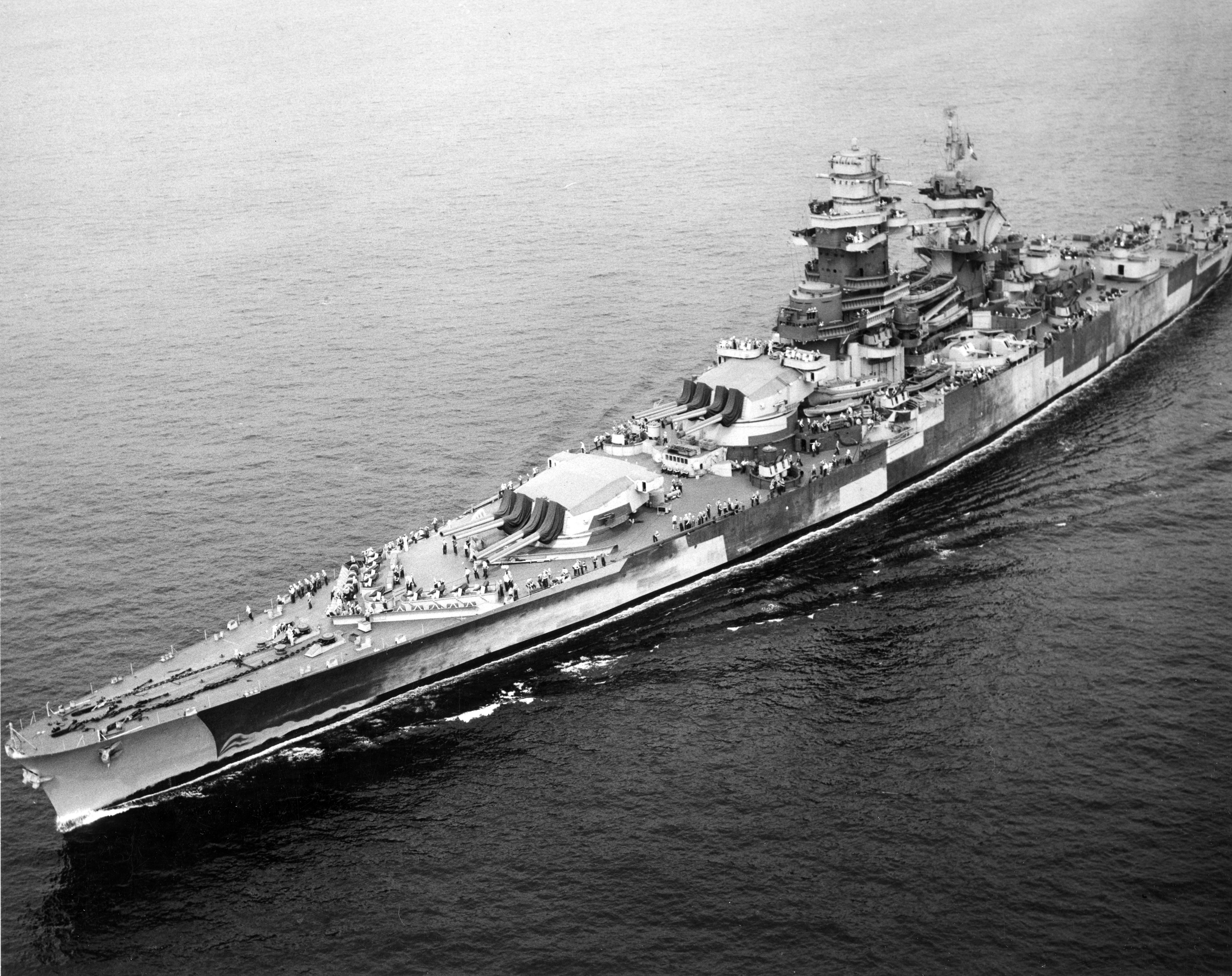
- Richelieu in September 1943 after her refit

History

France
- Name: Richelieu
- Namesake: Cardinal de Richelieu
- Builder: Arsenal de Brest
- Laid down: 22 October 1935
- Launched: 17 January 1939
- Commissioned: 1 April 1940
- Decommissioned: 1967
- Stricken: 1968
- Fate: Broken up, September 1968

General characteristics (original configuration)
- Class & type: Richelieu-class battleship
- Displacement: Standard: 37,250 long tons (37,850 t); Full load: 43,992 long tons (44,698 t)
- Length: 247.85 m (813 ft 2 in)
- Beam: 33.08 m (108 ft 6 in)
- Draft: Full load: 9.9 m (32 ft 6 in)
- Installed power: 6 × Indret Sural boilers; 155,000 shp (116,000 kW)
- Propulsion: 4 × Parsons geared turbines; 4 × screws
- Speed: 32 knots (59 km/h; 37 mph)
- Range: 9,500 nautical miles (17,600 km; 10,900 mi) at 15 kn (28 km/h; 17 mph)
- Complement: 1,569
- Armament: 8 × 380 mm (15-inch)/45 Modèle 1935 guns; 9 × 152 mm (6 in)/50 guns; 12 × 100 mm (3.9-inch) anti-aircraft guns; 8 × 37 mm (1.5 in) AA guns; 20 × 13.2 mm (0.52 in) Hotchkiss machine guns
- Armor: Belt: 330 mm (13 in); Main deck: 170 mm (6.7 in); Turrets: 430 mm (17 in); Conning tower: 340 mm (13 in)
- Aircraft carried: 4 × Loire 130 seaplanes
- Aviation facilities: 2 × catapults

General characteristics (1943 refit)
- Displacement: Standard: 43,957 t (43,263 long tons); Full load: 47,728 t (46,974 long tons)
- Draft: Full load: 10.68 m (35 ft)
- Complement: 1,930
- Sensors & processing systems: SF surface search radar; SA-2 air search radar
- Armament: 8 × 380 mm/45 guns; 9 × 152 mm/50 guns; 12 × 100 mm anti-aircraft guns; 56 × 40 mm (1.6 in) Bofors AA guns; 48 × 20 mm (0.79 in) Oerlikon AA cannons

Richelieu (French pronunciation: [ʁiʃ(ə)ljø]) was a French fast battleship, the lead ship of the Richelieu class. Built as a response to the Italian Littorio class, Richelieu and her sister ship Jean Bart were based on their immediate predecessors of the Dunkerque class: they used the same unconventional arrangement that grouped their main battery forward in two quadruple gun turrets. They were scaled up to accommodate a much more powerful main battery of eight 380 mm (15 in) guns (compared to the 330 mm (13 in) guns of the Dunkerques), with increased armor to protect them from guns of the same caliber.

Richelieu was laid down in 1935 and was launched in 1939, just before the outbreak of World War II in Europe. As war with Germany became increasingly likely, work on the ship was rushed to prepare her for commissioning in April 1940. Completed just days before the Germans won the Battle of France in June, Richelieu fled to Dakar in French West Africa to keep her under French control. There, she came under repeated British attacks that had been intended to either compel the battleship to join the Free French Naval Forces or sink her; these included during Operation Catapult in July 1940 and the Battle of Dakar in September.

Damaged in both attacks, the ship was slowly repaired before eventually being turned over to Free French control after the Allied invasion of North Africa in November 1942. After being sent to the United States for repairs and an extensive modernization, the ship served with the British Home Fleet in early 1944 before being deployed to the Eastern Fleet for operations against the Japanese in the Indian Ocean. These included several bombardment operations and in May 1945 she was present during the Battle of the Malacca Strait, though she was too far away to engage the Japanese force.

Richelieu was part of the force that liberated Singapore after the Japanese surrender in September, and she later operated in French Indochina as part of the initial effort to restore French colonial rule. Recalled to France in December 1945, she was repaired and modernized slightly in 1946. The ship saw relatively limited training in the immediate postwar years and, in 1952, she was removed from active service for use as a gunnery training ship. In 1956, she was placed in reserve and was thereafter used as a stationary training vessel and barracks ship until 1967, when the French Navy decided to discard her. She was sold for scrap in 1968, and broken up in Italy from 1968 to 1969.

== Design ==
When in 1934 Italy announced that it would begin building two Littorio-class battleships armed with 381 mm (15 in) guns, the French Navy immediately began preparations to counter them. The small Dunkerque-class battleships that had been ordered provided the template for the next French battleship design, but it needed to be scaled up to match the new Italian vessels, both in terms of offensive and defensive characteristics. The design staff considered 380 and 406 mm (16 in) guns, but the latter could not be incorporated in a design that remained within the 35,000 long tons (35,560 t) limit imposed by the Washington Naval Treaty and was quickly discarded. The Dunkerques carried their armament in two quadruple gun turrets arrayed in a superfiring pair forward of the superstructure, and the designers experimented with other arrangements, including combinations of triple and twin turrets, but the need to minimize the length of the armor belt (and thus its weight) necessitated the Dunkerque layout.

=== Characteristics ===
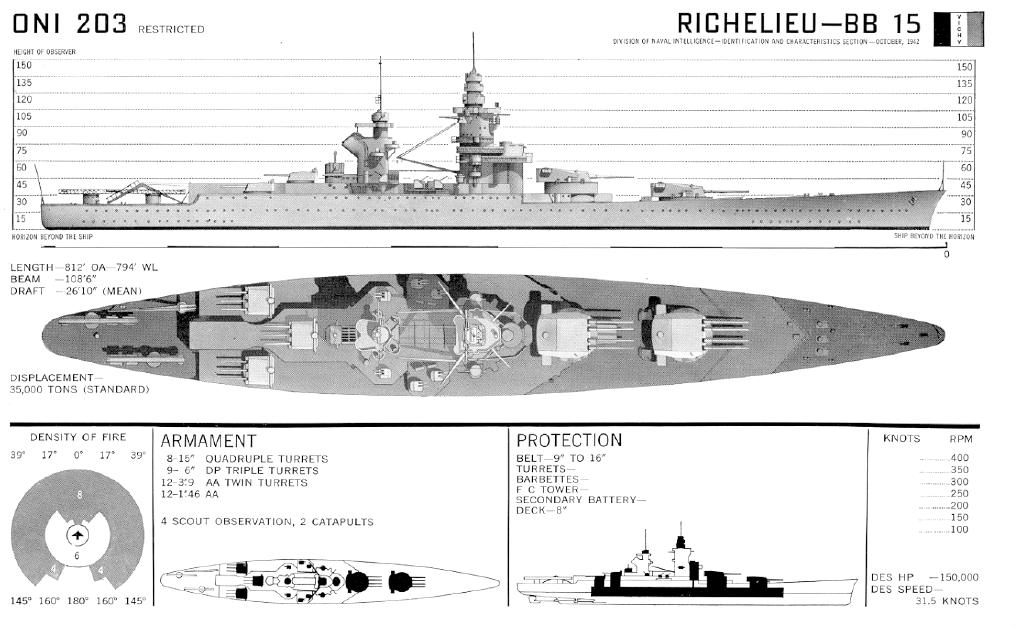
Recognition drawing of Richelieu in her original configuration

Richelieu displaced 37,250 long tons (37,850 t) standard and 43,992 long tons (44,698 t) fully loaded. She had an overall length of 247.85 m (813 ft 2 in), a beam of 33.08 m (108 ft 6 in), and a maximum draft of 9.9 m (32 ft 6 in). The ship had a very long forecastle deck that improved seakeeping forward and only stepped down to main deck level toward the stern. Her crew numbered 1,569 officers and men. The ship carried four Loire 130 seaplanes on the quarterdeck, and the aircraft facilities consisted of a steam catapult and a crane to handle the floatplanes.

She was powered by four Parsons geared steam turbines and six oil-fired Sural water-tube boilers, which were vented through a single large funnel that was combined with the main mast, a structure referred to as a mack. Her propulsion system developed a total of 155,000 shaft horsepower (116,000 kW) and yielded a maximum speed of 32 knots (59 km/h; 37 mph). At a cruising speed of 15 knots (28 km/h; 17 mph), the ship could steam for 9,500 nautical miles (17,600 km; 10,900 mi).

Richelieu was armed with eight 380 mm/45 Modèle (Mle) 1935 guns arranged in two quadruple gun turrets, (Note: /45 refers to the length of the gun in terms of calibers; a /45 gun is 45 times long as it is in bore diameter.) both of which were placed in a superfiring pair forward of the superstructure. Her secondary armament consisted of nine 152 mm (6 in) /55 Mle 1930 guns mounted in three triple turrets, arranged on the rear superstructure. Heavy anti-aircraft (AA) defense consisted of twelve 100 mm (3.9 in) /45 Mle 1930 anti-aircraft guns in six twin turrets; these were clustered amidships, three per side. Close range anti-aircraft defense was provided by a battery of eight 37 mm (1.5 in) guns in twin mounts and twenty 13.2 mm (0.52 in) machine guns in four quadruple and two twin mounts.

The ship's belt armor was 330 mm (13 in) thick amidships, and the main battery turrets were protected by 430 mm (17 in) of armor plate on the faces. The main armored deck was 170 mm (6.7 in) thick, and the conning tower had 340 mm (13 in) thick sides.

== Service ==
=== Construction ===
The contract for Richelieu was awarded to the Arsenal de Brest on 31 August 1935, and the keel for the new ship was laid down on 22 October in the No. 4 dock that had recently built Dunkerque. The slipway was not long enough to accommodate the entire length of the new battleship, and so the hull had to be built in pieces. The main section of the hull, which amounted to 197 m (646 ft), was built on the slipway, while a 43 m (141 ft) length of the bow and an 8 m (26 ft) length of her stern were built elsewhere and attached after the rest of the ship was launched on 17 January 1939. The French decision to lay down Richelieu in 1935 put the country in violation of the Washington Treaty, which was to expire on 31 December 1936, as the combined tonnage of the two Dunkerques and Richelieu exceeded the 70,000 long tons (71,000 t) that had been allotted to France during the moratorium on new battleship construction. France used the Anglo-German Naval Agreement, which Britain had unilaterally signed with Germany in June 1935, to dismiss British objections to the new ship, though they nevertheless slowed construction of Richelieu to ease British concerns. Work was also slowed by strikes in the shipyards for better pay and working conditions.

By the outbreak of World War II in September 1939, the hull had been assembled; the start of the war led the naval command to decide to slow work on other, less complete vessels to focus efforts on Richelieu and her sister ship Jean Bart. The ship began initial testing on 15 October while still fitting-out in an effort to rush the ship into service; the same day, the ship's first commander, Capitaine de vaisseau (CV—Ship-of-the-line captain) Marzin came aboard. Engine testing began on 14 January 1940, and a week later her main battery was completed when the last barrel was installed. Further engine testing was carried out between 31 March and 7 April; during this period, she was commissioned on 1 April. Formal acceptance trials began on 14 April. Repair work was conducted in Brest from 19 to 27 May, and fire control equipment for the main and secondary batteries was installed. Richelieu conducted full-power trials on 13 June, reaching 32.63 knots (60.43 km/h; 37.55 mph) from 179,000 shp (133,000 kW), exceeding her design performance. Test firings of the guns were conducted on 13 and 14 June. Work on the ship was completed on 15 June 1940, days before France surrendered to Germany after the Battle of France.

=== World War II ===
==== Under Vichy control: 1940–1942 ====
With German troops advancing across France by mid-June, the Navy decided to evacuate Richelieu to Dakar in French West Africa; while earlier plans had been to send the fleet to British ports to continue the war, when the possibility of a negotiated armistice arose, the government decided that the fleet would be a useful bargaining chip. As a result, vessels should be preserved under French control, away from German occupation. At 06:45, the ship took on a load of ammunition and fuel, though she received only 198 quarter charges of propellant for her main battery, which amounted to powder sufficient for 49 shots. Material that had not yet been installed was also hastily loaded onto the ship, to be fitted once Richelieu reached the safety of Dakar. She also took aboard gold reserves from the Bank of France and 250 cadets from the École Navale (Naval Academy). There was insufficient time to allow the full complement to assemble and board the ship, and at 04:00 the next morning, Richelieu got underway while German troops approached Brest. Richelieu steamed in company with the destroyers Fougueux and Frondeur while German aircraft made several ineffective attacks against the ships. The battleship's anti-aircraft guns returned fire without success. Initially cruising at a speed of 22 kn (41 km/h; 25 mph), boiler trouble forced the ships to decrease speed to 18 kn (33 km/h; 21 mph). The motors for her rudder also repeatedly broke down on the voyage, though the crew was able to repair them. While cruising off Casablanca, French Morocco at 17:00 on 20 June, the torpedo boats were detached to refuel, their place being taken by the new destroyer Fleuret. The two vessels then proceeded on to Dakar, where they arrived at 17:44 on 23 June.

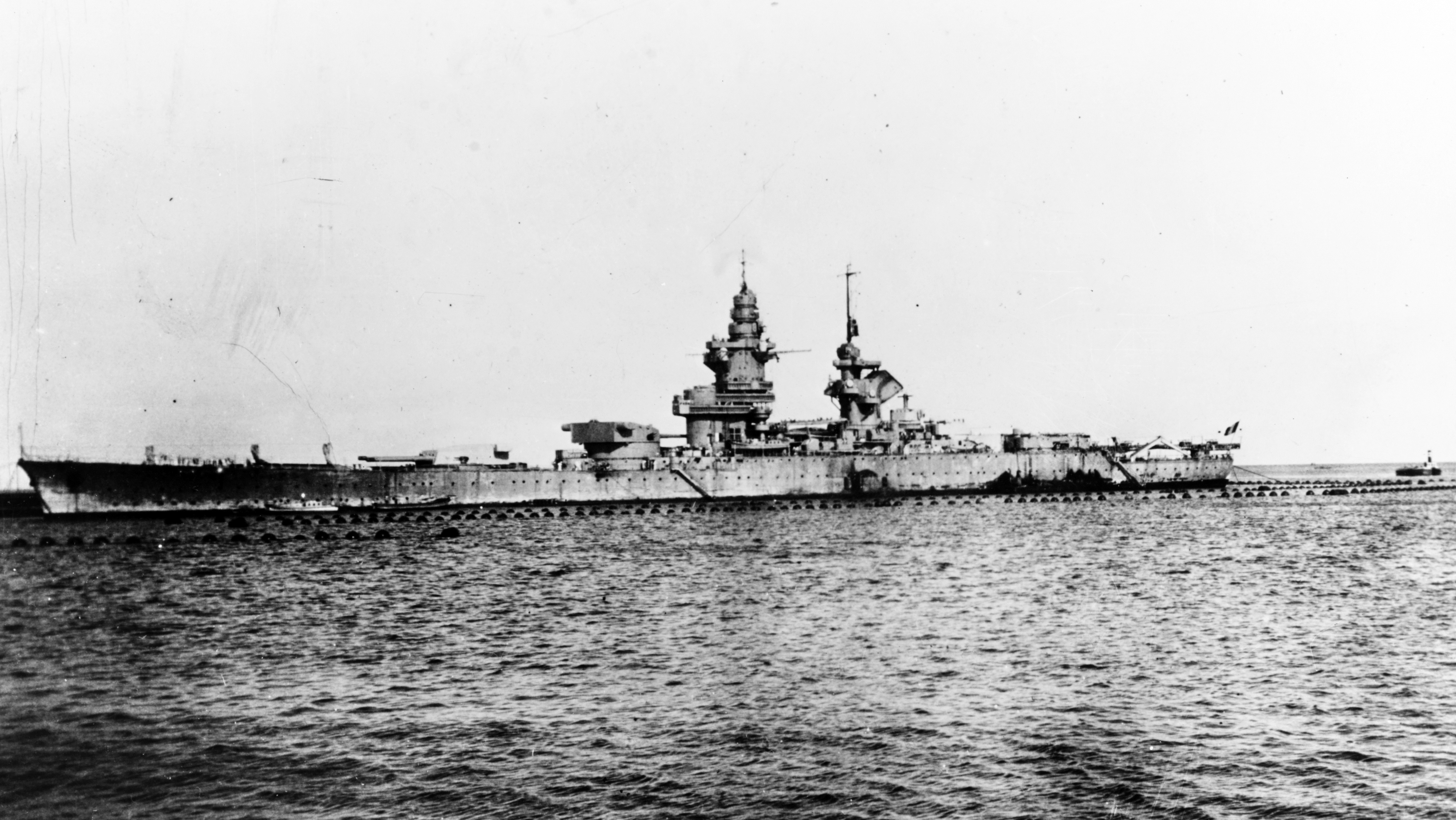
Richelieu in Dakar in 1940

On arriving in Dakar, an uneasy situation confronted Richelieu while armistice negotiations were still underway. The commander of French naval forces in the region, Contre-amiral (CA—Rear Admiral) Plançon and the governor-general of French West Africa, Léon Cayla, were inclined to remain in the war against Germany. Also, significant British naval units were in the area, including the aircraft carrier HMS Hermes moored in Dakar and the British South Atlantic Squadron, which was nearby. At the same time, Richelieu had used half of her fuel to escape Brest, and she could perform little sustained firing of her main or secondary guns. Admiral François Darlan, the Chief of Staff of the French Navy, sent a telegraph on the night of 23–24 June to warn Marzin that the British might attack the vessel to neutralize it in the event of a French surrender, and ordered him to begin preparations to scuttle the ship if the need arose. Meanwhile, on 23 June, the British heavy cruiser Dorsetshire departed Freetown to observe Richelieu's activities in Dakar.

On 25 June, Marzin received word that the French government had signed the Armistice with Germany. Darlan instructed him that the ship was to remain under French control, and if that proved to be impossible, he was to scuttle the ship or attempt to escape to the then-neutral United States. Marzin decided that, given the threat of British warships in the area, the best course of action was to try to escape to Casablanca and join the French fleet there, and so at 14:30 Richelieu got underway in company with Fleuret. Hermes raised anchor as well and began to follow Richelieu with her Fairey Swordfish torpedo bombers on her flight deck, but the coastal artillery trained their guns on the ship, convincing Hermes' commander to return to port. Dorsetshire nevertheless shadowed Richelieu while she was at sea. The next morning, Darlan, who feared that Marzin was trying to defect to the Free French forces, ordered him to return to Dakar. Marzin complied and turned the ships back to port, but while on the way, he received amended orders instructing him to wait some 120 nmi (220 km; 140 mi) north of Cape Verde to escort the 1st Division of Armed Merchant Cruisers to Dakar, as they were carrying another load of gold reserves from the Bank of France. Richelieu failed to make contact at the prescribed rendezvous point, and since she had not embarked any of her floatplanes before fleeing Brest, she could not conduct an aerial search. Marzin instead returned to Dakar on 28 June; the convoy arrived, having been significantly delayed, on 4 July.

After returning to port, work began to prepare the ship for action as quickly as possible. Marzin ordered that a stockpile of 330 mm propellant charges that had been stocked for the battleship Strasbourg before France's surrender be converted into charges that were usable by Richelieu. The secondary guns were readied for action ten days later, but they lacked a director capable of tracking aerial targets, so they could be used against surface ships only. Under the terms of the armistice, Richelieu was to be returned to Toulon, where she would be demobilized, though the Germans later decided against permitting the move, as they feared the British would try to seize the ship during the passage through the Strait of Gibraltar; the British, meanwhile, were under the mistaken impression that the Germans sought to seize the French fleet for their own use. This led to Operation Catapult, a series of attacks on French warships to neutralize vessels that would not defect to the Free French.

===== British attack on 8 July 1940 and repairs =====
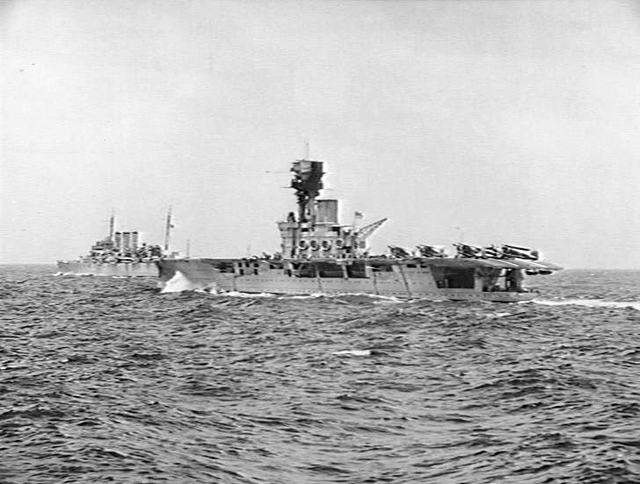
HMS Hermes (center) and Dorsetshire (background) off Dakar during the operation against Richelieu

The component of Catapult that targeted Richelieu consisted of the carrier Hermes, which joined the cruisers HMAS Australia and Dorsetshire off Dakar. On 4 July, the day after the British had attacked Mers-el-Kébir, Plançon ordered the submarines Le Glorieux and Le Héros to attack Dorsetshire while it cruised off the port. He also instructed the coastal batteries to open fire if she closed to within 15 km (9.3 mi), though Dorsetshire remained at a distance. Marzin moved Richelieu to a position near the island of Gorée, pointed south so that the ship's main battery could aim at any vessels that approached Dakar. The British had intended to send Force H to Dakar after the attack on Mers-el-Kébir, but the need to return to destroy Dunkerque forced the British to resort to Hermes; on 7 July, the sloop HMS Milford was sent to contact Plançon and issue the ultimatum to either surrender his ship to British control or be sunk.

Marzin prepared his ship to sortie the next morning; he intended to use the eight rounds loaded in his main guns to attack Hermes. Other forces in Dakar were put on alert and Le Héros again sortied to assist in the attack. While the French preparations were ongoing, the British sent a motorboat from Milford to drop four depth charges under Richelieu's stern to disable her screws, though this attempt failed. At 04:15, a group of Swordfish launched from Hermes as Richelieu was about to get underway. One of their torpedoes struck the ship aft on the starboard side and tore a hole that was 9.3 by 8.5 m (31 by 28 ft) between the propeller shafts. The resulting shock disabled many of the ship's systems. Two of her fire control directors were knocked off their tracks, the starboard propeller shafts were bent, and the blast caused significant flooding. Damage control teams pumped fuel out of the bunkers to counteract the loss of buoyancy aft and the ship was towed into port for repairs. Anti-torpedo nets were set up around the vessel, which had taken on some 2,400 t (2,400 long tons) of water and at low tide rested on the harbor bottom.

Later that afternoon, tankers came alongside and began pumping oil out of the ship's bunkers to reduce her draft, but water continued to leak into the hull through the cable tunnels. Pumps attached to the ship helped to control the flooding, but the hoses repeatedly pulled loose as Richelieu rose and fell with the waves. To further complicate the effort to repair the ship, Dakar lacked a dry dock sufficient to accommodate Richelieu; the battleship could not simply be drained and plated over. Instead, damaged bulkheads had to be patched and pumped out individually; by 28 August, some 1,300 t (1,300 long tons) of water remained aboard the ship. Heavy use of the pumps caused frequent breakdowns, which further slowed work. In his report on the attack and subsequent repairs, Marzin criticized faulty design and construction practices that hindered damage control efforts, including insufficient pumping equipment, poor quality control for the welding of bulkheads, and a failure to ensure that critical components like the turret trunks were watertight.

While work to control and reverse the flooding was ongoing, other repairs were necessary to return the ship to operational status. The fire-control directors needed to be re-seated in their tracks, wiring that had been damaged by flooding or leaking fuel oil had to be replaced, and several of the electrical generators, which had been badly shaken by the blast, needed to be rebuilt. Given the limited ability to repair the damage to the ship, Marzin focused efforts on ensuring that the main and secondary batteries could be effectively used, even if the ship could only be employed as a static floating battery against an expected second attack from British forces. Amiral (Admiral) Jean de Laborde flew to Dakar to conduct an inspection and help to organize the defenses. As part of these preparations, both Plançon and Cayla, who were suspected of being pro-British, were removed from their posts, with Plançon's place taken by CA Platon and then CA Landriau.

Workers in the local shipyard scavenged metal from other ships in the harbor to fabricate an 11.5 m (38 ft) square patch to cover the torpedo hole, which was planned to be installed by 10 September. This would allow the rear magazines for the 152 mm and 37 mm guns to be drained. At the same time, the shipyard began building a steel cofferdam around the ship that was to have been completed by late October, which would allow the rest of the hull to be pumped dry. With the hull pumped out, permanent repairs were to have been completed by January 1941. While this work was being carried out, the crew cleaned and painted the ship and continued to work on readying the armament. A total of 150 complete charges for the main battery were created by remanufacturing the stockpile intended for Strasbourg. Parts of the crew were dispersed for other tasks: 106 were sent to man the armed merchant cruisers in the harbor, whose reservist crews had to be demobilized, and the 64-man crew of the forward gun turret were sent to man the coastal battery at Cap Manuel. After another 132 reservists from Richelieu were demobilized, a total of 1,039 officers and men were left aboard the ship. The 100-, 37-, and 13.2 mm guns were kept manned continuously given the threat of further British air attacks.

===== Battle of Dakar =====
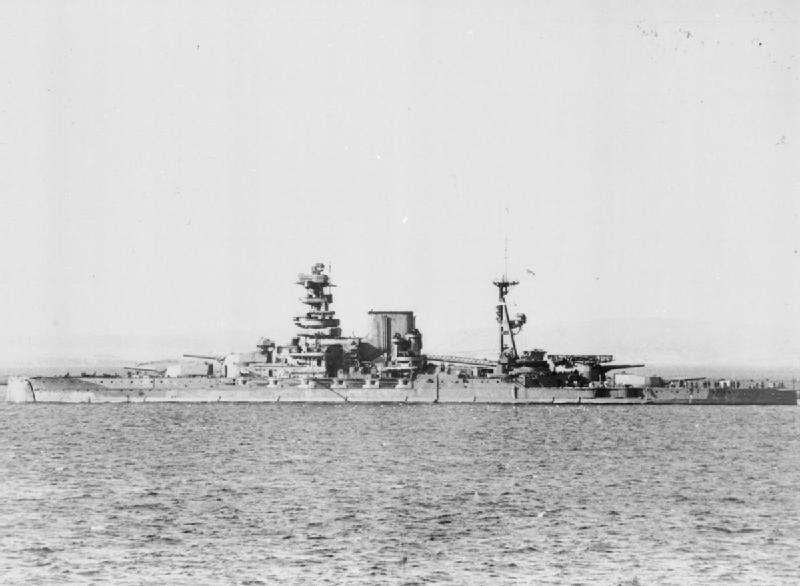
HMS Barham, Richelieu's primary opponent during the battle

While repairs were being carried out in August, the British began preparations for another attack, code-named Operation Menace. British Prime Minister Winston Churchill sought to use a contingent of Free French forces led by Charles de Gaulle to invade the colony and seize the ship for use against Germany. By late August, a convoy had been assembled with five ships carrying weapons and supplies got underway, later rendezvousing with a second convoy of six troop ships carrying some 2,400 Free French soldiers and 4,270 British soldiers. The naval support force consisted of the aircraft carrier Ark Royal and the battleships Barham and Resolution, along with four cruisers and numerous other warships. The plan called for de Gaulle to use his French forces to attempt to secure the colony, only calling on British support if the Vichy forces resisted him. At the same time, several French colonies in Africa defected to Free France, prompting the Vichy government to secure authorization from the German Armistice Commission to send several light cruisers and destroyers to reinforce their holdings in Africa, designated Force Y. Owing to the risk of encountering British vessels on the passage, the destroyers were temporarily left in Casablanca while the three cruisers, carrying supplies and additional men to crew the coastal batteries, raced south at high speed. They reached Dakar on 14 September, and after disembarking the men and supplies, continued on south to French Equatorial Africa (in what is now present-day Gabon).

The British believed that the arrival of Force Y indicated that the French were aware of Operation Menace, but de Gaulle decided to proceed with the attack regardless. While Force Y steamed south, two of the three cruisers were intercepted by British cruisers and forced to fall back to Dakar, arriving there again on 20 September, by which time the destroyers had arrived. On 22 September, the liner SS Banfora was due to arrive with a load of 380 mm shells, and as a result, French search aircraft were arrayed to the north to cover the liner's approach; they were completely surprised by the arrival of the Anglo-Free French force on the morning of 23 September. A small party of Free French troops sent to rally the port to de Gaulle was repulsed with machine-gun fire and Richelieu's 100 mm guns fired warning shots toward the Free French aviso Savorgnan de Brazza shortly after 07:00. On the approach of the sloops Commandant Dominé and Commandant Duboc at 08:10, Richelieu again fired warning shots from her 100 mm guns. The British warships approached the port and came under fire from the coastal batteries, leading the Anglo-Free French commanders, de Gaulle and Vice Admiral John Cunningham to conclude that they would have to directly attack the port if the operation was to succeed.

Barham and Resolution opened fire on Richelieu at 11:05, but poor visibility hampered the British shooting and they checked fire after twenty minutes, having inflicted only splinter damage to the cruiser Montcalm and the destroyer Le Malin. The French coastal batteries hit several of the cruisers and destroyers, but Richelieu was moored facing north, which prevented her from taking part in the initial duel. After the British withdrew, Marzin used tugboats to turn the ship far enough to enable her to bring her main battery to bear. The defenses of Dakar were now alerted. The Free French then attempted to land further east at Rufisque, but were repulsed. The British and Free French withdrew to regroup for another attack the next day. Between 06:25 and 08:00 on 24 September, the British launched three strikes with Swordfish and Blackburn Skua bombers. They scored no hits on Richelieu because of poor visibility, and near-misses caused no damage. In return, Richelieu's gunners claimed three of the six aircraft that were shot down, and damaged another. Ninety minutes later, the British battleships and two heavy cruisers approached and fired their 380 mm main batteries at Richelieu.

Richelieu returned fire at 09:40, but her No. 7 gun was destroyed by a shell that detonated in the barrel and the No. 8 gun was also badly damaged. This was first traced to the use of the remanufactured propellant from Strasbourg, but a later inquiry in 1941 found the explosions were caused by a flaw in the design of the shell base. Guns 5 and 6 remained in action but failed to score any hits. At 09:57, one of Richelieu's secondary guns hit Barham. In return, the British ships inflicted only minor splinter damage before breaking off at 10:07. The French had counted some 160 shells landing near the ship. The French laid smoke screens to obscure Richelieu before the British returned to the action at 12:53, initially targeting a destroyer before bombarding the port for the next 30 minutes. Richelieu was not hit and, from 12:56, she fired guns 5 and 6 at the British cruisers, quickly straddling one of them and convincing them to disengage. She fired four 380 mm shells at Barham at 13:11–13:12 but failed to score a hit, though both British battleships were hit several times by coastal batteries. After disengaging for the day, de Gaulle decided to abandon the operation, but Cunningham convinced him to allow a final attempt the next morning. In the meantime, Marzin decided to transfer the crews from turret 2 to turret 1, which also required moving the shells and propellant between magazines.

As the British approached on the morning of 25 September, Marzin decided to engage Barham with his main battery and Resolution with his 152 mm guns. While the British were approaching their bombardment positions, Richelieu shot down a reconnaissance plane shortly before 07:00. She opened fire at 09:04 with her main battery, firing two shots that fell short, and the coastal guns and Force Y cruisers followed suit shortly thereafter. While the British battleships were turning to unmask their rear guns, the submarine Bévéziers torpedoed and badly damaged Resolution. Barham avoided the torpedoes and opened fire, quickly straddling Richelieu and at 09:15, she scored a hit amidships that penetrated above the side armor, causing no casualties. In return, Richelieu hit Barham in the bow, causing minor damage. At 09:25, the British disengaged to cover Resolution's withdrawal. After the British left, the gun crew attempted to clear the shells that had been loaded in guns 5 and 6 and the shell in No. 5 also exploded, leaving No. 6 the only operable gun in the turret. In total, French warships in the harbor lost 100 dead and 182 wounded, with another 84 killed and 197 wounded among the civilian population.

From 29 September, the battlecruiser HMS Renown and escorting destroyers were detached from Force H to patrol off Dakar, as the British believed Richelieu would be transferred to metropolitan France for repairs. The British ships remained in the area until 1 October when it became clear the ship would not be moved.

===== Repairs and defection to Free France =====
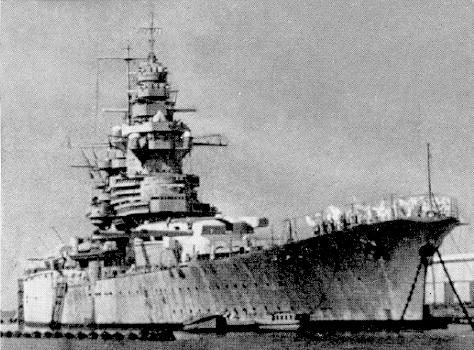
Richelieu at Dakar in 1941

Repair work resumed immediately. The hit from Barham did little serious damage to the ship, but it nevertheless caused extensive deformation of interior bulkheads, the armor deck was forced down where the shell hit it, and the uptakes from the boilers were damaged. Wiring in the area was also cut by fragments and needed to be replaced. On 10 October, the workers attempted to attach the patch that had been manufactured, but it did not work; it did not create a watertight seal, which meant the compartments could not be pumped out. The patch was abandoned in the hopes that the cofferdam, then nearing completion, would work. The cofferdam was modeled to conform to the hull and was built with an interior void that could be used as a ballast tank so it could be floated in position and sunk in place. The cofferdam was ready by late December, which allowed the hull to be pumped dry and then sealed with welded plates and cement; the hull was finally sealed by 28 February 1941. Further repairs were hampered by the German Armistice Commission, which attempted to slow progress to prevent the ship from returning to full operational status. They blocked the shipment of new guns or a new propeller shaft, and severely constrained the transfer of other equipment. During this period, on 27 February, CV Deramond replaced Marzin as the ship's commander.

As repairs were carried out, the ship saw little activity through late 1942 apart from engaging unidentified aircraft on 28 July and 29 September 1941 and 26 February and 12 May 1942. During this period, in April 1941, the ship received the first radar set installed on a French battleship. And in July, her Loire seaplanes finally arrived; tests with the catapults were conducted in October. On 10 April 1942, the ship conducted a test firing with gun No. 6 to demonstrate that the shell design problem had been corrected; all six shells were fired without incident. On 8 November, American and British forces landed in French North Africa (code-named Operation Torch), which prompted the Germans to invade the rest of Vichy France, which in turn led Darlan to defect to the Allies with the rest of the fleet.

The United States Navy sent a group to evaluate the ships under Darlan's control to determine which should be modernized in the United States. The only French battleship still in service, Richelieu was an obvious candidate. The US Navy had not initially been interested in repairing Richelieu; while the Germans and Italians retained a number of powerful battleships, the United States had recently commissioned or would soon complete eight fast battleships, more than sufficient to cover US requirements for the Pacific War and to send to Europe to reinforce the Royal Navy. In addition, repairing and modernizing a ship the size of Richelieu would require significant resources that could be used for other purposes. But pressure from Britain and the Free French convinced the Navy to agree to the project. For France, she was the only surviving modern battleship and thus a major symbol of national prestige, while the British had long sought to acquire the vessel to stiffen the Mediterranean Fleet, which at that time had just two new battleships to oppose their three Italian counterparts.

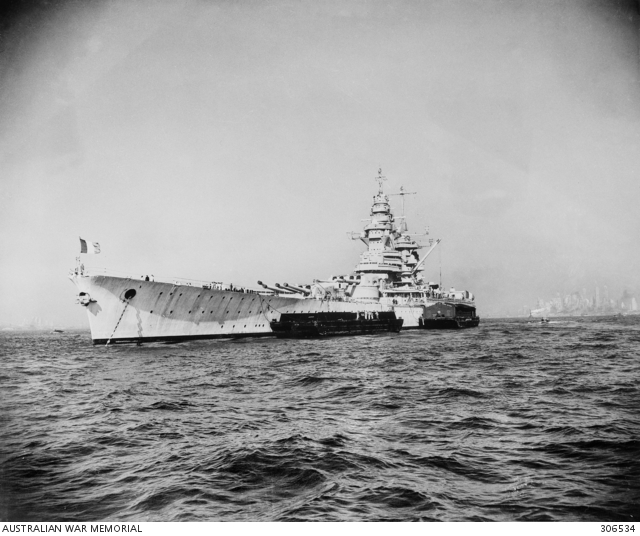
Richelieu in the United States for repairs

She ran sea trials from 25 to 29 January 1943 to evaluate the state of her engines, which had not been used since July 1940. Her aircraft facilities and anti-aircraft armament were removed during the evaluation period, as they would be replaced by US equipment. On 30 January, she departed Dakar with Montcalm, bound for New York City, where both vessels would be modernized. Richelieu steamed at a speed of 14 kn (26 km/h; 16 mph) and her rudder had to be held to seven degrees to account for the hull deformation. The ships arrived on 11 February and on the 18th, Richelieu was taken into Dock No. 5 at the Brooklyn Navy Yard to begin the modernization.

==== Free-French career: 1943–1945 ====
===== Refit in New York City =====
Political tensions between the United States and France played a major role in determining how much Richelieu would be modernized. The US Navy refused to transfer the latest radar equipment on the basis that it was too sensitive to be released. As a result, much of the improvement was limited to the installation of a new anti-aircraft battery of the latest US weapons and auxiliary equipment in addition to a thorough overhaul and permanent repairs to the torpedo damage. Three shifts of workers, totaling some 2,000 men, worked on the ship twenty-four hours a day, seven days a week, for five months to rush the ship back into service. The modifications to the ship increased her displacement by about 3,000 t (3,000 long tons). While the ship was being modernized, CV Lambert replaced Deramont as the ship's commander on 29 April.

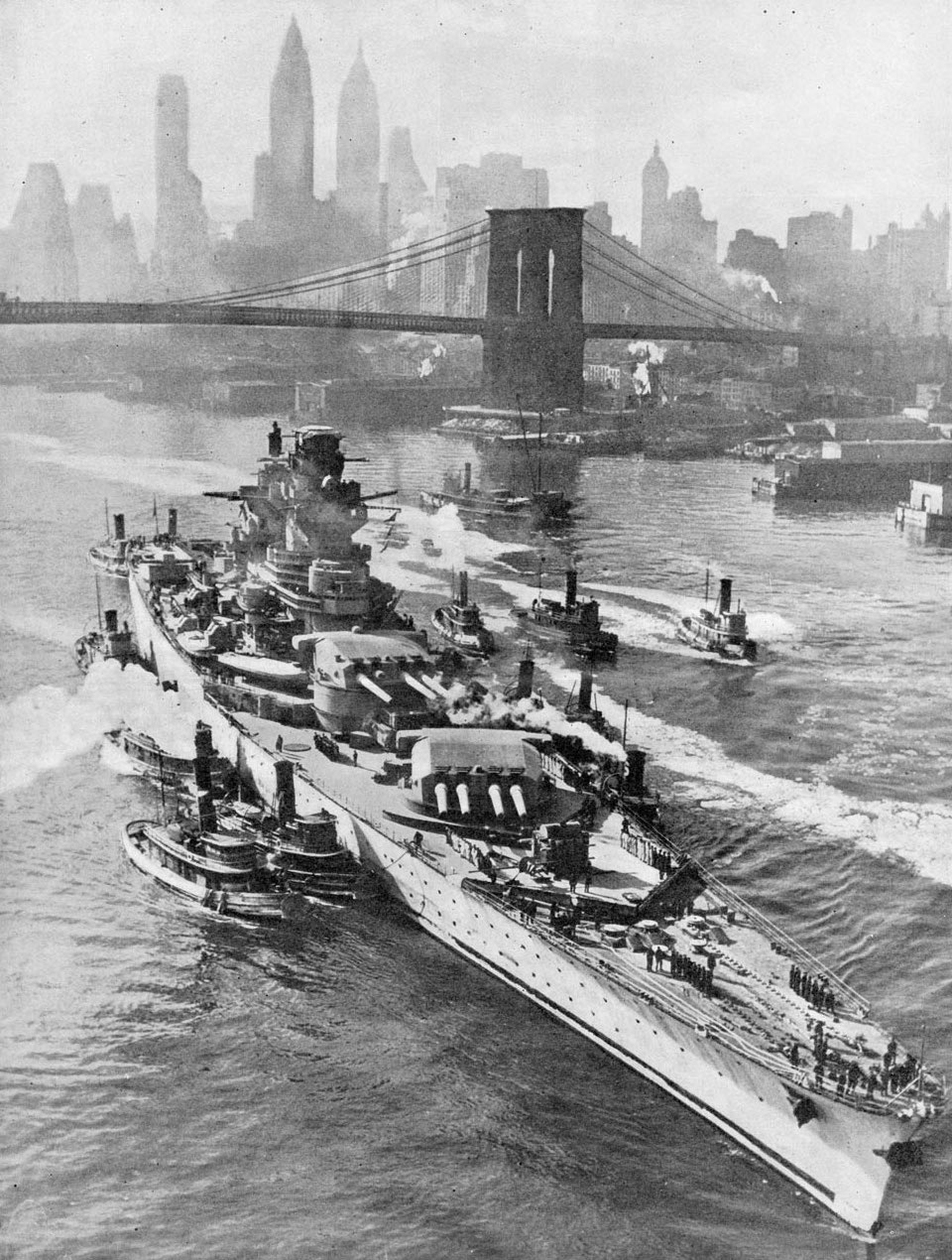
Richelieu arrives in New York with her damaged turret. The uppermost fire control director on the fore tower had to be dismantled for her to pass under the Brooklyn Bridge to the New York Navy Yard

The ship's armament required extensive repairs and modifications to bring Richelieu up to modern standards. First, three of the eight main battery guns had to be replaced, which required removing the turret roof. Since the gun cradles were undamaged, the guns were simply replaced by barrels taken from Jean Bart, which had been recovered at Casablanca during Operation Torch. The shell handling equipment of both the primary and secondary guns was thoroughly overhauled, with wiring being replaced and the shell and propellant lifts being rebuilt—the latter had never been made to function correctly while the ship was in Dakar. Ammunition for the primary and secondary guns was now a problem, as the source, factories in France, was occupied by German forces. Drawings of the plans for the 380 mm shells were prepared in Dakar and forwarded to the United States, where a contract to produce 930 shells was ordered from Crucible Steel. American 6-inch/47 Mk 16 shells were used as a starting point to supply the 152 mm guns, as they were the same caliber and required relatively minor modifications for use in the French weapons.

Her 100 mm guns were retained, but her light anti-aircraft battery now consisted of fifty-six 40 mm (1.6 in) Bofors guns in quadruple mounts, all placed with their own Mk 51 gun director. These were arranged with two abreast the superfiring turret, two on either side of the forward tower, another two per side of the aft tower, and the remaining four on the quarterdeck, where the aircraft catapults had been. These guns were supplemented with fifty 20 mm (0.79 in) Oerlikon cannons, all in individual or twin mounts. Nine were placed on the forecastle aft of the breakwater, four were mounted on the superfiring turret, nine were placed on the former aircraft hangar, with the rest dispersed around the superstructure, including on the towers and the shelter deck.

Richelieu's tower foremast was heavily reconfigured; the upper main battery director, which had never been operational and had been removed to allow the ship to clear the Brooklyn Bridge, was left off. In its place, the radome for the SF surface search radar was installed, along with the mattress antenna for the SA-2 air search radar; these were short-range sets that had been designed for small craft, the SA-2 intended for PT boats. Most of the command spaces in the tower were converted for other uses. The fire control systems for the main battery had to be replaced and those for the secondary guns were repaired with new wiring and telephones. The ship's original Anschütz gyrocompasses were replaced with Sperry models. The ship's propulsion system was thoroughly overhauled: the turbines were thoroughly repaired and the boilers were re-tubed. Much of the wiring throughout the ship was replaced, and a degaussing cable was installed.

To repair the hull, the concrete was broken up and removed, the sections that had been most badly damaged by the torpedo were stripped of all fittings, and deformed bulkheads and plating were cut out. After more than two and a half years without being dry-docked in a tropical port, the hull needed maintenance beyond simply repairing the torpedo damage, though given the conditions to which it had been subjected, it was in fairly good condition. It was sandblasted and those sections of plating that exhibited pitting had new plates welded over the top. The starboard propeller shafts also required repairs: the mounting brackets were straightened, but the inboard shaft was too badly damaged and had to be replaced. Bethlehem Steel fabricated a replacement that was installed in June. The bottom row of portholes were closed off, as the increase in displacement pushed them closer to the waterline.

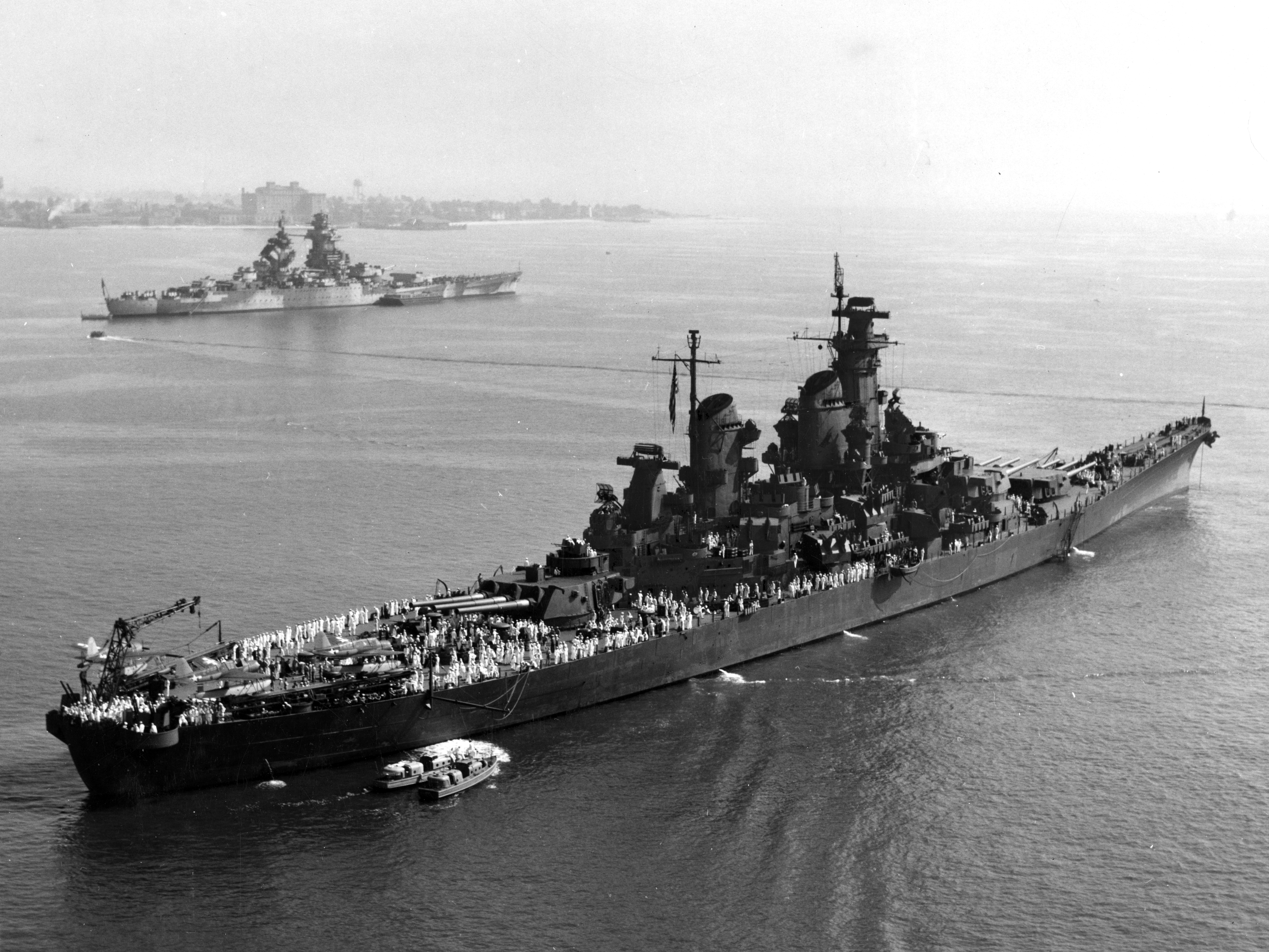
Richelieu (left distance) encounters the American battleship USS New Jersey at anchor in Hampton Roads on 7 September 1943 during New Jersey's training ahead of Pacific deployment.

Beginning in late August and continuing into mid-September, Richelieu began firing trials in the Chesapeake Bay; firing the main battery forward on 29 August revealed the need for a blast screen to protect the forecastle 20 mm guns, as the test accidentally destroyed two of the guns and their ammunition lockers. With her normal displacement now at 43,600 t (42,900 long tons) and her hull slightly bowed (possibly caused by the torpedo hit), Richelieu began machinery trials in late September. On 25 September, the ship reached her new top speed of 31.5 kn (58.3 km/h; 36.2 mph), cruising at that speed for thirty minutes, despite the deformation of her hull and the significant increase in displacement. The following day, she steamed for six hours at 26.5 kn (49.1 km/h; 30.5 mph), for two hours at 28.9 kn (53.5 km/h; 33.3 mph), and finally for fifty minutes at 30.2 kn (55.9 km/h; 34.8 mph).

As completed, the ship's displacement had grown to 43,957 t (43,263 long tons) normally and 47,728 t (46,974 long tons) fully loaded; draft correspondingly increased to 9.22 m (30.2 ft) and 10.68 m (35 ft), respectively. Compared to her original wartime crew of 1,569 officers and men, Richelieu was now to be manned by a total of 1,930, amounting to 86 officers, 287 petty officers, and 1,557 men. The major increase in complement was largely the result of the additional anti-aircraft guns and radar systems. The ship conducted further trials into October, and on the 14th the ship was finally ready to get underway for European waters.

===== In European waters =====
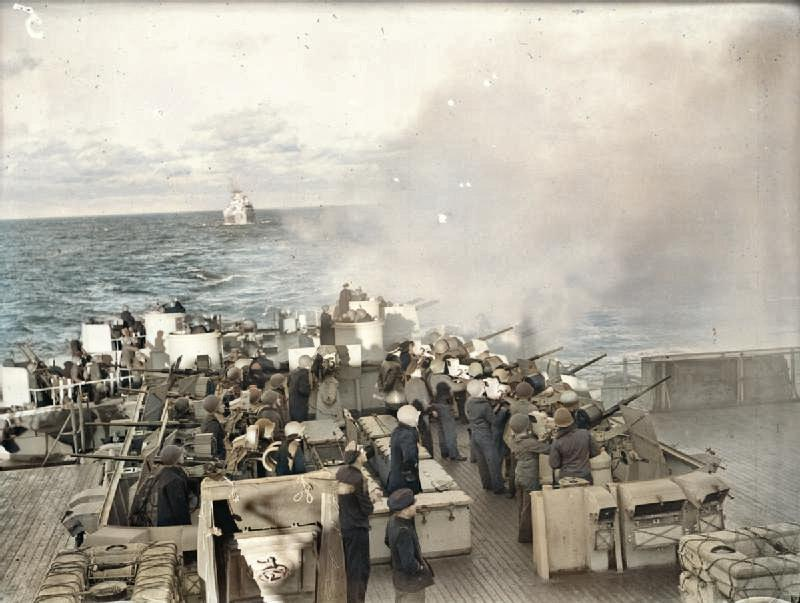
Anti-aircraft gunners aboard Richelieu during target practice with the British fleet

Escorted by the destroyers USS Tarbell and Ellet, Richelieu departed the US on 14 October, nominally bound for Gibraltar. The destroyers departed while underway, allowing Richelieu to keep up a speed of 24 knots (44 km/h; 28 mph) in heavy seas. The ship stopped in the Azores, Portugal, where she met the French destroyers Le Fantasque and Le Terrible and the British destroyer Active, which was limited to a speed of 20 kn (37 km/h; 23 mph); Active quickly left the group, which proceeded not to Gibraltar, but to Mers El Kébir. There, she replenished supplies; it had been intended to deploy the ship with the Mediterranean Fleet, but Italy had surrendered in September, removing the threat posed by the Italian Littorio-class battleships. Richelieu was instead sent north to join the Home Fleet, which included the four surviving King George V-class battleships. When Richelieu departed the Mediterranean, Cunningham, now the commander of the Mediterranean Fleet, recommended to the Admiralty that she be fitted with gunnery radars. The ship was escorted by the destroyers HMS Musketeer and HMS Scourge, and on arrival in Scapa Flow, Admiral Bruce Fraser, the Home Fleet commander, inspected the battleship on 24 November. Work began immediately on installing a Type 284 gunnery radar while the ship began an intensive period of training to acclimate the ship's crew to operating with British units.

The ship saw little activity over the winter of 1943–1944 until February 1944, when she took part in Operation Posthorn. Richelieu, the battleship Anson, and the carrier Furious departed Scapa Flow on 10 February for a raid on German shipping off occupied Norway. The objective was to lure the German heavy cruisers in the area so that the two battleships could destroy them. The carrier aircraft achieved little, sinking a single freighter of 3,000 tons and damaging a repair ship while trading one of the Supermarine Seafire fighters for a German Bf 109 fighter. The fleet returned to port on the 12th, and Richelieu thereafter went to Rosyth for ten days to rest the crew. A repeat sweep was to have taken place at the end of the month, but two of the escorting destroyers collided while leaving Scapa Flow, leading to a postponement that became permanent as a result of bad weather. In March, the Allies determined that five battleships to counter the battleship Tirpitz (which had been damaged in September 1943) was excessive. As a result, Richelieu was detached for other operations. The Allied command initially considered employing her to support the invasion of Normandy, but as she was only supplied with armor-piercing shells, she was instead sent to reinforce the British Eastern Fleet, along with a group of escort aircraft carriers.

The ship accordingly steamed to Greenock to take on fuel and ammunition, before cruising south to the Mediterranean with an escort of three British destroyers. She stopped in Algiers on 26 March to take on additional supplies; there, she was visited by General Henri Giraud and Admiral André Lemonnier. Richelieu thereafter departed for the Suez Canal, steaming at a speed of 25 kn (46 km/h; 29 mph); while underway, she began to experience significant boiler problems. The boiler blowers were not providing sufficient oxygen, so the boilers were not fully burning the fuel. As a result, the boiler tubes quickly became fouled and caused overheating. Richelieu stopped in Aden for repairs to the boiler tubes, but the problem was not corrected.

===== First deployment with the British Eastern Fleet =====
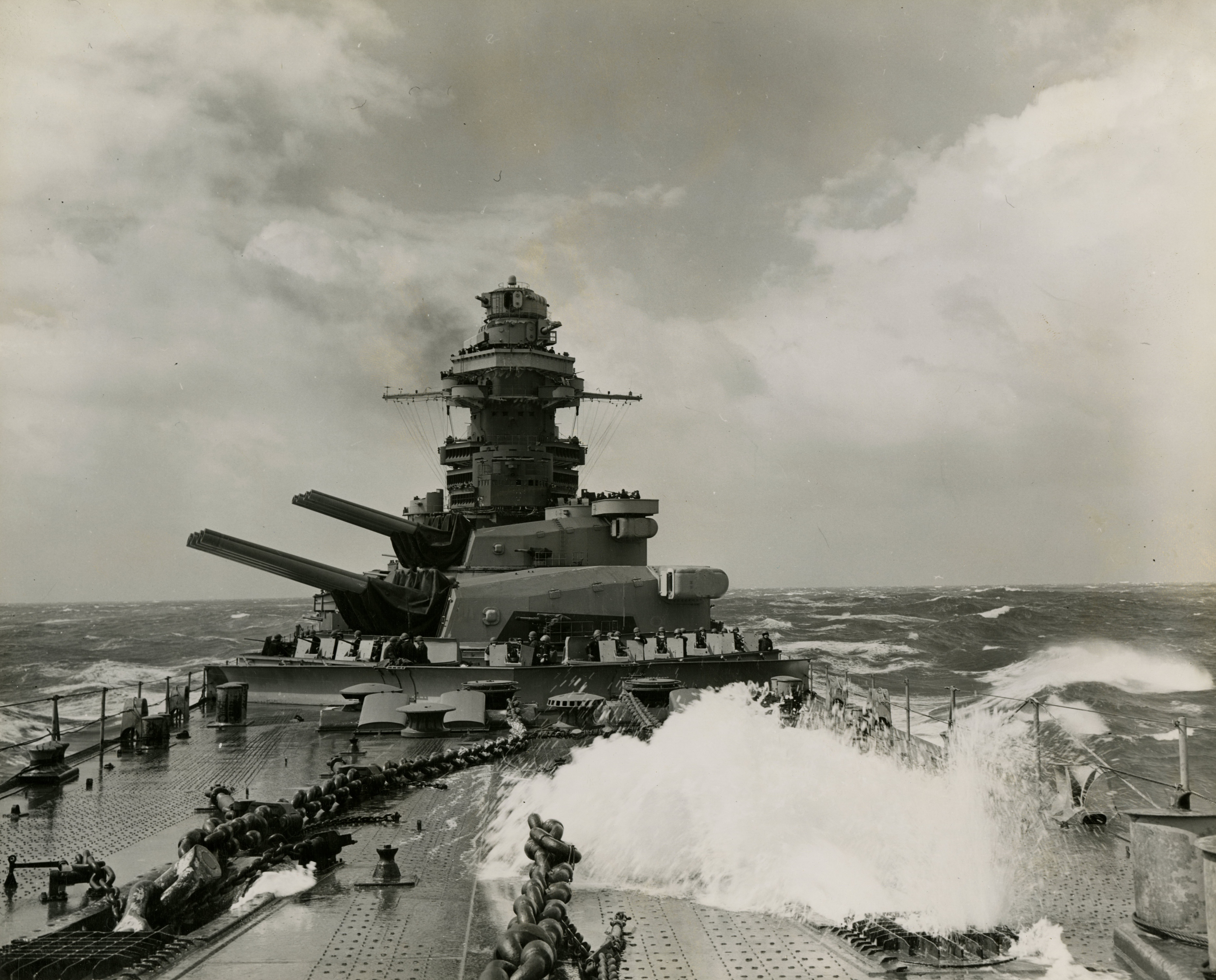
Richelieu in March 1944 en route to the Indian Ocean

On entering the Indian Ocean, Richelieu picked up an escort consisting of the destroyers Rotherham, Racehorse, and Quadrant. The four ships arrived in Trincomalee, Ceylon on 10 April, where they joined an Allied fleet that included the carriers Illustrious and USS Saratoga, the battleships Valiant and Queen Elizabeth, and numerous cruisers and destroyers, commanded by Admiral James Somerville. On 16 April, the Eastern Fleet got underway for Operation Cockpit, a diversionary raid to distract the Japanese while American forces landed at Hollandia in New Guinea. Somerville divided his fleet into two squadrons; Richelieu served in Force 69, the main element, with Queen Elizabeth and Valiant, while Renown operated with the two carriers. The plan for Operation Cockpit called for carrier strikes on the port of Sabang, Netherlands East Indies. The fleet arrived in position early on 19 April, and after the carrier aircraft struck the port, Japanese bombers counter-attacked and Richelieu engaged the aircraft with her 100 mm and 40 mm batteries.

The next major operation conducted by the Eastern Fleet, Operation Transom, was timed to coincide with American operations in the Central Pacific to keep the attention of the Japanese fleet based in Singapore focused away from the American fleet. For this operation, the target was the major base at Surabaya, which also had significant oil refinery facilities. The Eastern Fleet got underway on 7 May and stopped to refuel on 15 May before arriving two days later. The strike proceeded uneventfully for Richelieu and on 18 May the American contingent detached to rejoin the main American fleet in the Pacific while the Eastern Fleet returned to Trincomalee, arriving on 27 May. Two days later, Richelieu, Queen Elizabeth, and six destroyers steamed to Colombo to rest their crews. While there, Richelieu was visited by Admiral Louis Mountbatten, Supreme Allied Commander of the South-East Asia Theatre. On 31 May, CV Merveilleux du Vignaux replaced Lambert as the ship's commander.

Somerville planned another raid for mid-June: Operation Pedal, a carrier attack on the harbor of Port Blair in the Andaman Islands. The purpose of the attack was to again distract the Japanese fleet units in Singapore while American forces embarked on Operation Forager, the invasion of the Marianas Islands. For the Anglo-French operation, Somerville took only the fast ships, including Richelieu, Renown, and Illustrious with their accompanying cruiser and destroyer screens. These ships, designated Force 60, sortied on 19 June and two days later, Illustrious' aircraft struck Japanese targets in the port. The ships arrived back in Trincomalee on 23 June. Operation Crimson followed in July, and given the lack of a response from the Japanese fleet to the earlier raids, Somerville decided to use his battleships and battlecruiser to bombard Sabang and Sumatra. Richelieu and the other ships conducted shooting practice on 7, 14–15, and 17 July in preparation for the raid. The plan called for Richelieu, Valiant, Queen Elizabeth, and Renown, supported by cruisers, to shell the port at longer range while the Dutch cruiser Tromp led a group of destroyers in a close-range attack. Illustrious, joined by the carrier Victorious, which had recently arrived, provided air cover to the fleet.

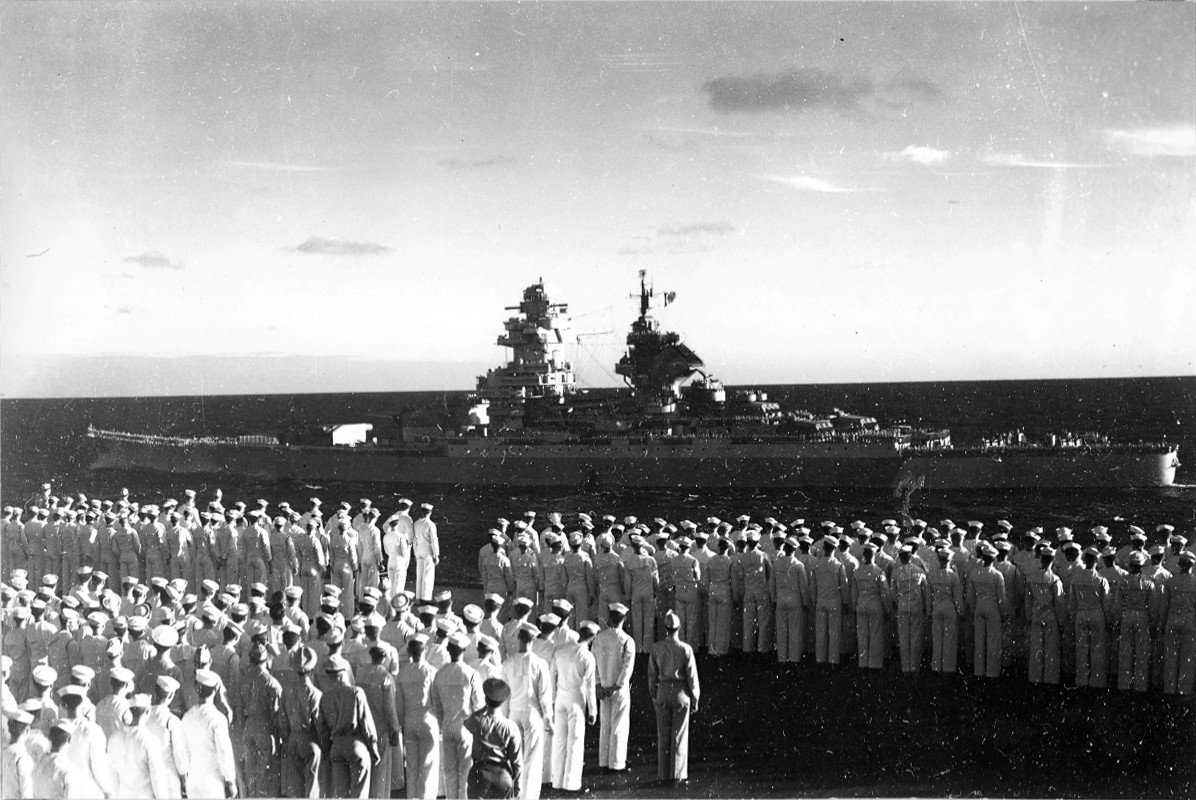
Richelieu on 18 May 1944 after the conclusion of Operation Transom, taken from USS Saratoga

The Eastern Fleet departed on 22 July and reached the target on the morning of 25 July; the carriers launched their combat air patrols and the surface combatants steamed to approach their targets. Richelieu was the last vessel in the line, astern of Renown. Queen Elizabeth, the leading battleship, opened fire at 06:54 at a range of 6,000 m (20,000 ft). The other ships quickly followed suit and F4U Corsair fighters circled overhead to spot for the ships' guns. Richelieu fired four-gun salvos, with two guns per turret, and she scored hits with the second salvo, demolishing several buildings and damaging the power station. Her secondary turrets neutralized a Japanese coastal artillery battery that had been engaging Tromp. At 07:15, the ships ceased firing, and in the brief bombardment, Richelieu had fired 81 main battery APC shells—this amounted to a rate of fire of a salvo every 50 seconds, nearly twice as fast as the British ships. Japanese aircraft attacked the fleet as it withdrew, but they were kept at bay by the carriers' fighters and heavy anti-aircraft fire from the ships. The fleet arrived back in Trincomalee on 27 July.

By this time, Richelieu was beginning to suffer from reduced speed, the result of continued boiler trouble and biofouling of her hull. Admiral Laurence E. Power, who had replaced Somerville as the fleet commander, detached Richelieu for a refit. The British had initially offered the floating dry-dock AFD-23, but Merveilleux du Vignaux believed that the dry-dock would not be able to accommodate a vessel the size of his ship (he proved to be correct when on 8 August, AFD-23 capsized with Valiant aboard). Richelieu left on 6 September, bound for Algiers with three escorting destroyers. Le Terrible and Le Fantasque took over escort duties after Richelieu passed through the Suez Canal, and on 23 September the three ships arrived in Algiers. Richelieu then steamed north to Toulon on 1 October where she was visited again by Lemonnier, but the shipyard there was in ruins, so she moved to Casablanca on 10 October to be refitted. In addition to the hull cleaning and boiler repairs, she had new fire control and search radars installed, including a US SG-1 search radar, British Type-281B air search radar, and Type-285P fire control radars, in addition to other equipment, including an FV1 jammer and high-frequency direction finding gear.

===== Second deployment with the British Eastern Fleet =====
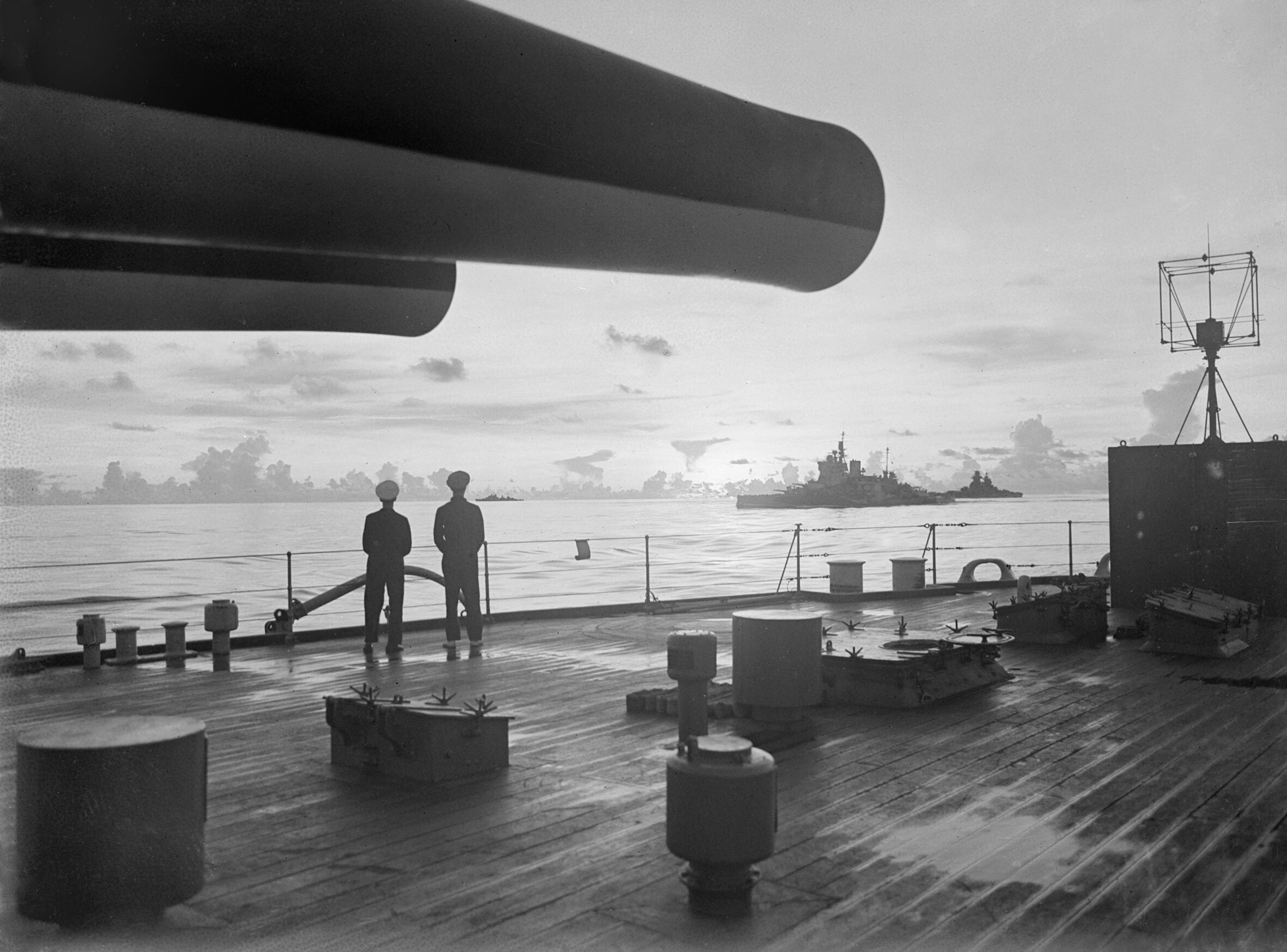
Seen from the deck of HMS Queen Elizabeth are Valiant (center-right) and Richelieu (right background)

On 23 January 1945, Richelieu left Casablanca for Gibraltar, arriving there two days later to have her hull cleaned and repainted. The French sought to deploy an independent task force consisting of Richelieu, the four light cruisers still in service, and four destroyers, with a view toward reestablishing French control in Indochina. But the United States opposed the move and refused to allocate the aircraft carriers and support ships that would have been necessary for another independent fleet, and so Richelieu could only be sent, alone, back to the Eastern Fleet. The ship conducted trials in February that revealed the problem with her boilers had finally been corrected and she thereafter got underway for Trincomalee, arriving on 20 March. By this time, the modern elements of the Eastern Fleet had been detached to form the British Pacific Fleet, with the Eastern Fleet being renamed the East Indies Fleet. This unit, still under Power's command, consisted of Queen Elizabeth and Renown, nine cruisers, ten escort carriers, and twenty destroyers. Japanese naval strength at Singapore had also significantly decreased to just four heavy cruisers and several destroyers.

For the next few weeks, Richelieu was occupied with shooting drills with her primary and secondary batteries and tests for the anti-aircraft radars and command systems. Now assigned to Force 63 of the East Indies Fleet, Richelieu sortied on 8 April to take part in Operation Sunfish, another bombardment of Sabang while aircraft scouted possible landing beaches near the city of Padang on the coast of Sumatra. The ships allocated for the operation consisted of Richelieu, Queen Elizabeth, two heavy cruisers, two escort carriers, and five destroyers. Early on 11 April, the two battleships, one of the cruisers, and three destroyers bombarded the island while the other vessels conducted the reconnaissance operation. Richelieu fired seven salvos with her main battery and used her secondary guns to once again silence the coastal battery on the island. Japanese aircraft launched a poorly-coordinated attack on the battleships but they failed to score any hits. After further carrier operations around Padang, the fleet returned to port on 20 April.

The next major operation followed a week later. Operation Bishop, a strike against Japanese airfields in the Nicobar and Andaman Islands, was to cover British Army landings at Rangoon in Burma. The plan called for the East Indies Fleet to be divided into multiple groups, each with escorting cruisers and destroyers: four of the escort carriers were to directly support the landings, Richelieu and Queen Elizabeth each formed independent surface action groups, and another pair of escort carriers provided air protection for the surface groups. The fleet got underway on 27 April and reached Car Nicobar two days later. Richelieu bombarded the airfields at a range of 23,600 m (77,400 ft), firing a total of 80 main and 45 secondary shells. She incurred minor damage to her bow 20 mm guns from the blast effects of firing the main battery nearly directly forward. The fleet then proceeded to the Andamans, and at 17:30, Richelieu opened fire at Port Blair; poor visibility hampered her shooting, and she ceased fire at 18:07, by now having expended the main battery ammunition that had been allotted for the bombardment. She nevertheless returned on 2 May to shell the harbor with her secondary guns, firing 120 rounds and inflicting significant damage to the harbor facilities. The fleet steamed north to Rangoon to support the landings, but it was discovered that the Japanese had already withdrawn, allowing the fleet to return to Trincomalee on 8 May 1945.

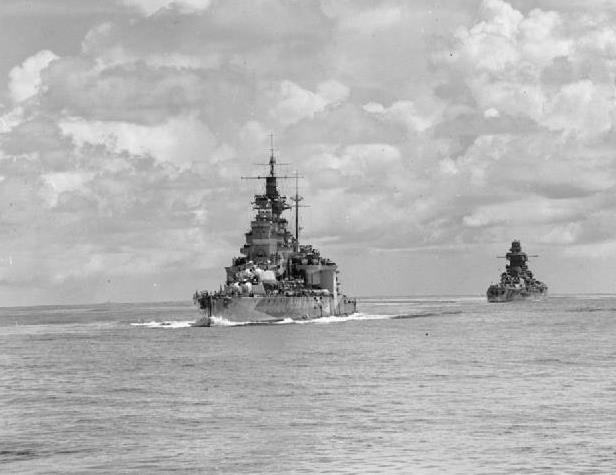
Richelieu astern of Valiant during Operation Bishop

A decrypted Japanese radio signal revealed that the cruiser Haguro and the destroyer Kamikaze were to steam from Singapore to Port Blair to evacuate the garrison there on the night of 12–13 May while another transport vessel would pick up the troops at Car Nicobar. On 9 May, a pair of British submarines spotted Haguro as it passed through the Malacca Strait, so the East Indies Fleet launched Operation Dukedom to intercept the Japanese ships. Richelieu steamed with the heavy cruiser HMS Cumberland as Group 3 of Force 61. Aware that Allied ships were at sea, Haguro and Kamikaze turned back, though they were spotted by aircraft from the escort carriers and then sunk by destroyers of the 26th Destroyer Flotilla before Richelieu and Cumberland could arrive. Japanese aircraft attacked the fleet as it withdrew back to Trincomalee but were, once again, poorly coordinated and they failed to damage the ships. Richelieu arrived in port on 18 May.

On arrival, the ship took on additional ammunition and fuel, and over the coming weeks, she underwent repairs to her boilers and took part in shooting practice. The bombardments carried out earlier in the year had revealed excessive dispersion of the main battery shells, particularly if both guns on one side of the turret were fired at the same time. The crew at that time was unable to determine the cause of the problem, though tests with the remanufactured Strasbourg charges reduced the problem. On 3 June, the destroyer Le Triomphant arrived with spare equipment for Richelieu, which was sent to Durban for another refit. Her hull again needed to be scraped and her boilers required a re-tubing. The ship had to stop in Diego Suarez on the way to disembark non-white crewmen at the request of the racist government of South Africa; though this caused resentment among the crew, the French nevertheless complied. Richelieuarrived on 18 July and work lasted from 31 July to 10 August. Thirteen of the ship's 20 mm guns were replaced with four 40 mm guns, as the lighter weapons had proved to be ineffective against kamikazes. The ship conducted training and trials of South Africa before departing for Diego Suarez, ultimately arriving back in Trincomalee on 18 August, by which time Japan had surrendered.

=== Postwar era ===
Immediately after the surrender of Japan, French and British forces began their attempts to reassert control in their Japanese-occupied colonies. On 7 September, Richelieu got underway in company with the British battleship Nelson to take part in Operation Zipper, the amphibious landing on Sumatra. Two days later, Richelieu detonated a magnetic mine, though she suffered only minor damage; the force of the blast pushed in some hull plates by 10 to 12 cm (3.9 to 4.7 in) and inflicted minor shock damage to the lighting system, but the vessel remained with the fleet. After landing the troops with no opposition, Richelieu moved to Singapore on 11 September to participate in Operation Tiderace, the liberation of the city, the following day. She returned to Trincomalee on 16 September before getting underway again on 27 September, bound for Indochina. She steamed with Le Triomphant as escorts for the transport ships Queen Emma and Princess Beatrix, which carried French soldiers to restore colonial rule in Indochina. French rule was opposed by the Viet Minh, and on arrival Richelieu was used to support the forces ashore in a variety of capacities: she served as a staging area, hospital, artillery support, and troop transport. She also contributed a landing party to the forces fighting to reassert French control.

Richelieu, Le Triomphant, and Le Fantasque took part in Operation Mapor at Nha Trang from 20 to 26 November, providing heavy fire support to soldiers fighting in the area. By this time, a French squadron consisting of the aircraft carrier Béarn and the cruisers Gloire, Suffren, and Émile Bertin had arrived in mid-October, allowing Richelieu to be returned to France. Before leaving, Richelieu sent her four single 40 mm guns and most of her 20 mm guns ashore, along with a considerable stockpile of ammunition for the guns and 152 mm shells. She departed on 29 December and arrived in Toulon on 11 February 1946, thereafter taking part in the transport effort to send French soldiers back from France to North Africa. With that completed, she steamed north to Cherbourg, arriving to be dry-docked on 16 March. Repairs lasted until 20 July, and consisted of replacing the starboard propeller, correcting the hull damage from the mine in September 1945, and thoroughly overhauling her boilers.

With the repairs completed, Richelieu sailed to Britain to carry the crew for the aircraft carrier HMS Colossus, which was to be loaned to the French for five years, serving as Arromanches. Richelieu thereafter began a training cruise that included stops in Casablanca, Mers-el-Kébir, and Dakar. Later that year, she visited Portugal in company with Arromanches. She returned to Brest for modifications to the secondary battery from February to March 1947. The ship thereafter formed the core of a battle group that included three ex-German destroyers, based in Cherbourg. The group, along with a carrier group centered on Arromanches and cruiser group, both based in Toulon, were combined to form the Force d'Intervention, with Richelieu as the flagship of Vice Amiral (Vice Admiral) Robert Jaujard. The unit embarked on a training cruise to Africa in May and June, beginning with the three groups assembling in Casablanca on 8 May. Richelieu arrived back in Cherbourg on 13 June and began a period of maintenance and training of new crew members. Another training cruise to North Africa followed late in 1947, and while there she conducted shooting practice to try to determine the cause of the excessive shell dispersion. The subsequent installation of 60-millisecond delays to the firing circuits of the outer guns in the turrets created enough space between the shells that they did not disrupt each other in flight, significantly improving the issue.

The Force d'Interventionwas reactivated for another cruise in early 1948; the three constituent groups rendezvoused at Toulon and then conducted training exercises off North Africa. While in Mers-el-Kébir, the ship was slightly damaged while being moored in the port. Following the conclusion of the maneuvers, the force was disbanded and Richelieu steamed north to Brest, arriving on 29 May. The ship was in need of a thorough refit, and she was dry-docked in Cherbourg from August to September to survey the work that would be needed to be done. Jaujard left the ship and her crew was reduced to 750 men. Since the French naval budget was in a very limited state owing to the wrecked French economy in the immediate postwar years, Richelieu's refit was postponed to allow the funds to be used to complete Jean Bart instead. Richelieu was accordingly placed in reserve on 1 April 1949. The refit eventually began on 1 January 1950 and lasted until 24 October 1951, and it included a thorough overhaul of her propulsion machinery, replacement of her worn main and secondary battery guns, and repairs to her anti-aircraft battery, along with other modifications.

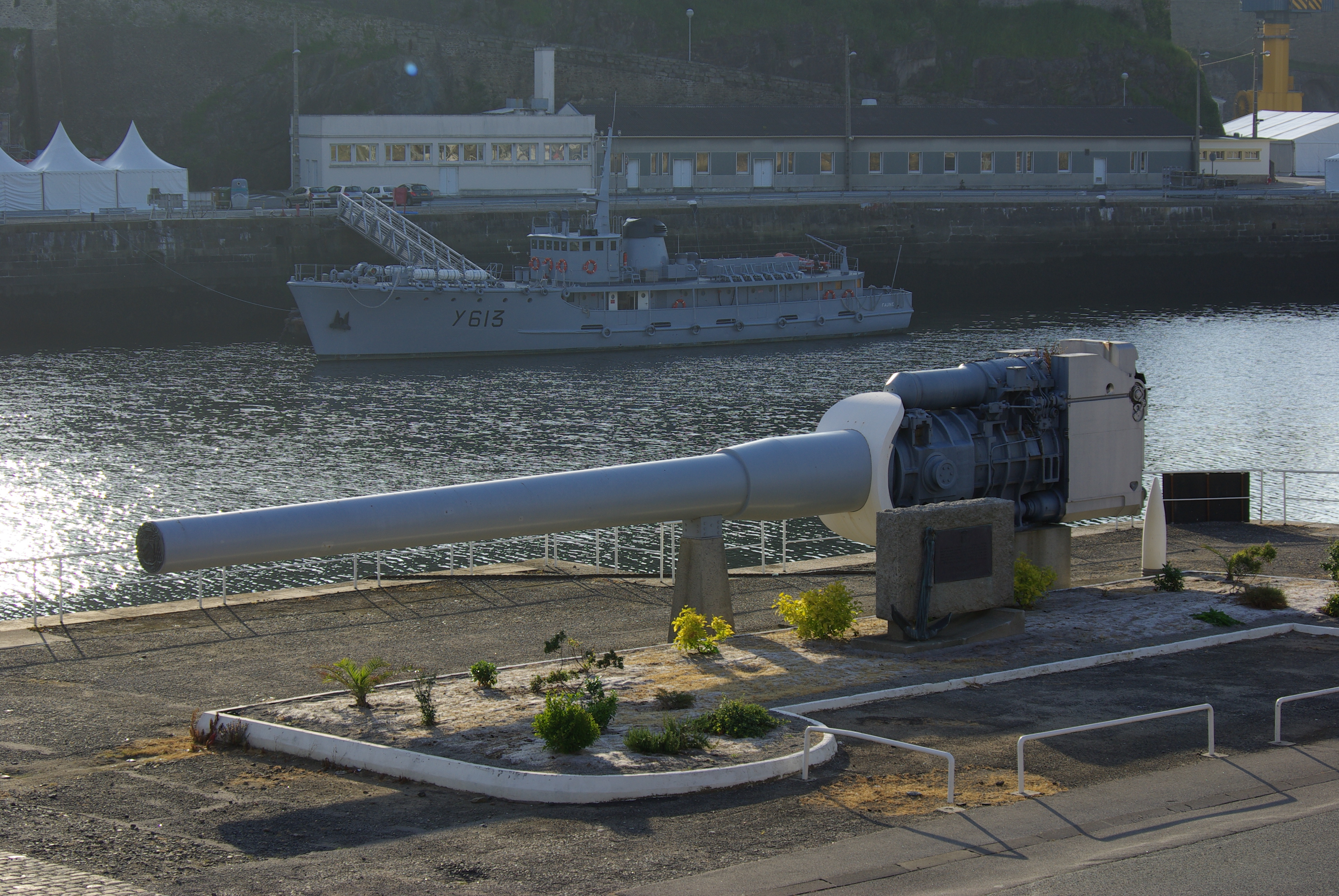
One of the two remaining 380 mm guns of Richelieu, by the Penfeld river in Brest

During the refit, it was decided that the ship's anti-aircraft battery was too dated to allow the ship to operate in the era of jet aircraft; coupled with the need to update the ship's radar and electronics and install more capable command spaces, the costs would have been prohibitively high for the French Navy. Instead of fully modernizing the vessel, the navy decided to employ Richelieu as a training ship in the gunnery school in February 1951. After completing the refit, the ship underwent trials in November that involved firing nine rounds per gun from the main battery; this would be the last time Richelieu fired the 380 mm guns. Beginning in May 1952, the ship was based in Toulon as the flagship of CA Champion, and she spent the next few years conducting shooting practice with the secondary and smaller weapons to train the fleet's gunners. Another refit followed from October 1953 to February 1954. This involved replacing the British gunnery radar with a French-built set.

For the first and last time of either of their careers, Richelieu and Jean Bart cruised together on 30 January 1956. The ship's career as a sea-going gunnery ship ended in February, when she was laid up in Brest. To prepare Richelieu for reserve, dehumidifiers were installed in the secondary turrets to inhibit rust and the 100 mm and 40 mm quad mounts were covered. The single 40 mm guns and all of the 20 mm guns still aboard the vessel were removed. She was thereafter used as a stationary school ship for reserve officers and as a floating barracks until 30 September 1967, when she was struck from the naval register. Renamed Q432, she was condemned on 16 January 1968 and sold to the Genoa-based ship breaker Cantieri Navali Santa Maria in September. Before she departed Brest, the four 380 mm guns of Turret I were removed and two were later preserved, one in Brest and the other in Ruelle. Richelieu was then towed to La Spezia, where she was broken up for scrap over the course of the following year.
