= Robert Jaujard =

French naval officer (1896–1977)

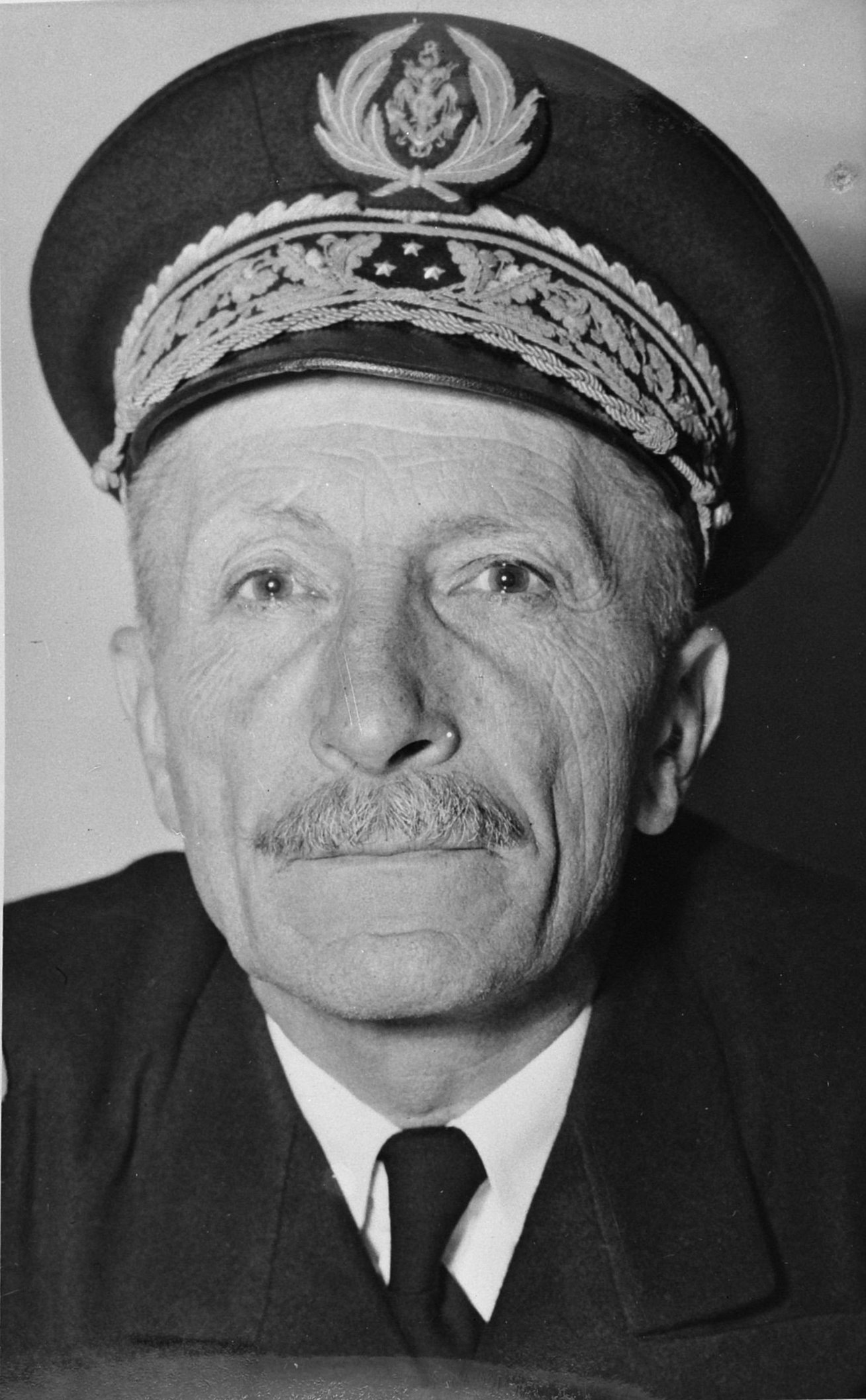
- Jaujard in 1948
- Born: March 6, 1896; Saint-Martin-de-Saint-Maixent, Deux-Sèvres, France
- Died: January 25, 1977 (aged 80) Toulon, Var, France
- Allegiance: France
- Service years: 1914–1961?
- Rank: Squadron vice-admiral
- Commands: Var (oil tanker; 1926); Foch (cruiser; 1931); Fortuné (torpedo boat; 1933–1934); Vauquelin (destroyer; 1937); Georges-Leygues (cruiser; 1943); Commander of the Navy at Algiers (1944); 4th Cruiser Division (1944); Flank Force Commander (1944); Richelieu group (1947)
- Conflicts: World War I World War II
- Awards: Grand Officer of the Legion of Honour, by decree on 17 March 1949 Commander of the Legion of Honour, by decree on 15 January 1945 Officer of the Legion of Honour, by decree on 11 June 1937 Chevalier of the Legion of Honour, by decree on 27 March 1925 Croix de guerre 1939–1945 Chevalier of the Ordre du Mérite Maritime (25 May 1932) Order of the British Empire (Honorary Commander; 26 December 1946) Grand Officer of the Order of Ouissam Alaouite
- Alma mater: École navale

Robert Jaujard (French pronunciation: [ʁɔbɛʁ ʒoʒaʁ]; 6 March 1896 – 25 January 1977) was a French naval officer.

== Life ==
Born into a Protestant family from Sainte-Foy-la-Grande (Gironde), his father was a pastor and would later become a navy chaplain.

He got his start in the navy in September 1914 as a seaman on the Duguay-Trouin. He was promoted boatswain's mate (maître de manœuvre) aboard the armoured cruiser Jeanne-d'Arc in March 1915. He entered the École navale in September of that same year and left as a midshipman (aspirant) in April 1916. He then embarked on the destroyer Aspirant-Herber in the Mediterranean Sea.

Having become ensign first-class in April 1918, Jaujard found himself aboard the Condorcet and the Pothuau that same year, and on the Lorraine the next. Then, in 1920, he served on the armoured cruiser Montcalm, where he was noticed by Admiral Jules-Théophile Docteur.

After becoming a navy lieutenant in January 1921, he belonged to the navy's Far East divisional general staff under François Darlan, who took him along as first mate on an aviso that functioned as a piloting school, named the Chamois (1922–1923). He thereafter embarked on the Ancre (1924) and was then sent to the general staff of the maritime prefect of Rochefort, embarking once again on the battleship Lorraine in December 1925, this time as officer in charge of ship's movements (officier de manœuvre).

In 1926, he commanded the oil tanker Var in the Mediterranean, and then became officer in charge of ship's movements on the Jeanne-d'Arc, and next on the Edgar-Quinet, always under Darlan (1927–1928), before embarking as executive officer on the torpedo boat Boulonnais in 1929.

Having become corvette captain in 1931 and being assigned as deputy commander of the cruiser Foch at Brest, Jaujard commanded the torpedo boat Fortuné of the Mediterranean squadron in 1933–1934, and in 1935 supervised work at the new École navale campus in Brest. He was then named head of internal and security service on the battleship Dunkerque and his work aboard ship was officially deemed satisfactory.

Having become frigate captain in 1937, he commanded the destroyer Vauquelin in the Mediterranean and then became first mate on the cruiser Algérie in 1940. He then got himself noticed at the time of Opération Vado (which involved bombarding the port at Genoa) and was thus cited for his sang-froid (roughly, calmness in the face of danger) and his tactical skill.

After becoming captain ("capitaine de vaisseau") in July 1941, Jaujard was first second-in-command on the general staff of Southern Maritime Forces at Algiers. In January 1943, he was commanding the cruiser Georges Leygues in the Free French forces. The German auxiliary cruiser Portland was sunk on 13 April 1943 in the South Atlantic Ocean as it was trying to run the Allied blockade.

By January 1944, Jaujard was commanding the navy at Algiers.

By March of the same year, he had risen to rear admiral (contre-amiral), and two months later, he was commanding the IV Cruiser Division, and he took part in the Normandy landings on D-Day (6 June 1944), successfully bombarding the German positions at Port-en-Bessin. In August 1944, he likewise took part in Operation Dragoon, the Allied invasion of Provence on the fifteenth of that month. While in command of the so-called Flank Force, a unit that brought together cruisers and fighter aircraft, he supported Allied armies' progress on the Italian coast.

After World War II, in whose wake he reached the rank of vice admiral in April 1946, he held the position of Major General of the Navy (a job title rather than a rank). In 1947, he commanded the Richelieu group and the intervention force. He was "NATO Admiral — Western Europe" in 1948, and then "Admiral — Central Europe" in 1951.

He took the rank and title of squadron vice admiral in September 1952. He was highly esteemed by Dwight D. Eisenhower. In 1954, he was named a titular member of the Armed Forces High Council.

Jaujard was transferred to the "second section" (for French officers no longer on active duty, but still kept at the armed forces minister's disposal should they be needed) in April 1956. He died on 25 January 1977 in Toulon.

== Honours ==
In addition to the awards bestowed upon him by the French Republic and others, as detailed in the information box, a street in Toulon, Rue Amiral Jaujard, has been named in Jaujard's honour.
