= Pierre-Marie Poisson =

French sculptor

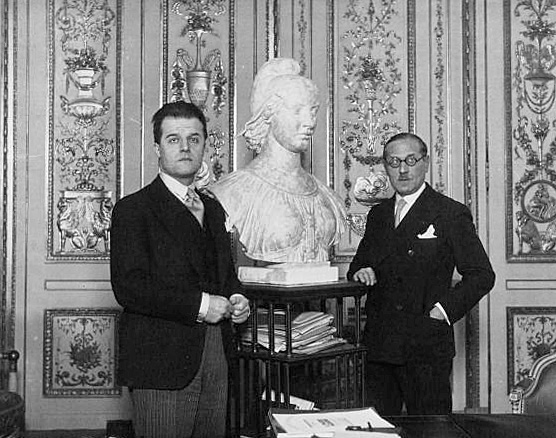
- Pierre-Marie Poisson (left), 1933
- Born: 19 November 1876; Niort, France
- Died: 11 January 1953 (aged 76); Paris, France
- Occupations: Sculptor and Medallist

Pierre-Marie Poisson was born in Niort on 19 November 1876 and died in Paris on 11 January 1953. He was a French sculptor and medallist.

== Biography ==
Pierre-Marie Poisson was born in Niort on 19 November 1876. Early studies at the local school were followed by the Nantes's college "Toutes Aides". From 1893 to 1896 he studied at the Toulouse École des Beaux-Arts before enrollment at the École des Beaux-Arts in Paris where he was attached to Louis-Ernest Barrias's studio. From 1899 he started exhibiting at the Société des Artistes Français. In 1907 he won the Société des Artistes Français' medal of honour which was accompanied by a bursary to allow him to study at the villa Abd-el-Tif in Algeria. He was to stay there for 6 years. In 1923 he became a Chevalier de la Légion d'honneur. He practiced as a medallist and sculptor both of monuments and busts and in 1922 his home town of Niort commissioned him to carry out the sculptural work on their war memorial. This was followed in 1925 by his work on the Le Havre war memorial, a huge composition on which he was to work for three years and which is considered to be his chef-d'oeuvre and to be one of France's finest war memorials.

He was to work on decoration for the ocean liner "Ile-de-France", on a fountain for Paris' Trocadéro and sculptures for the façade of the Saint-Nicolas-du-Chardonnet church. In 1935 he worked on two bas-reliefs for the "Normandie"'s dining room. He worked until 1951 when he completed his final commission for the "Fontaine de la guérison". He died in Paris on 11 January 1953.

== Main works ==
=== "la Petite Fille de Bou-Saada" ===
This work by Poisson, one of his studies whilst in Algeria, can be seen in Niort's museum.

=== Bust of Jacques de Liniers ===
De Liniers was born in Niort and Poisson was commissioned to execute his bust for a monument there in 1910.

=== Bust of a young boy ===
This bust depicts Claude, the sculptor's son. The work dates to 1928. It was exhibited at the Salon des Tuileries and purchased by the State. A plaster version can be seen in the Musées de Niort.

=== Bust of Madame Poisson or Luce ===
Also dates to 1928 and held by Poitiers' Musée Sainte-Croix. The Musée de Niort also hold a plaster version and the Musée national d'art moderne hold a bronze version cast by Alexis Rudier.

=== Statuette "La Santé Retrouvée" or "Fontaine de la Guerison" ===
Dates to 1951. A model for a bronze statue in Poitiers replacing the figures of the inventors of quinine Pelletier and Caventou. The original by E.Cormier, had been melted down by the Germans during the occupation.

=== Decoration for the 1937 Paris exhibition ===
For the Paris exhibition of 1937, one of the pavilions recreated a French embassy and artists, designers, craftsmen and sculptors were commissioned to work on its decoration. Poisson was commissioned to work on one of the two lamps for the balcony of the embassy's imagined salon.

=== "La Jeunesse" ===
This sculpture in ronde-bosse was created by Poisson for the 1937 exposition universelle and can be seen around the fountain in the garden of the Trocadéro together with Léon Drivier's sculpture "la Joie de Vivre".

=== "la Baigneuse" ===
Also known as "Baigneuse à la Draperie". Bronze versions of this 1938 composition held by various parties and the plaster model lodged with the Musée d'art moderne in Paris. Poitiers' Musée Sainte-Croix hold the plaster version.

=== Bust of Jean Claude Auriol ===
This plaster bust of the French president's grandson is held by Poitiers' Musées de la ville et de la société des antiquaires de l'Ouest.

=== Scène de Mosquée ===
This plaster bas-relief can be seen in Bourg-en-Bresse's Musée de Brou.

=== Bust of Marianne ===
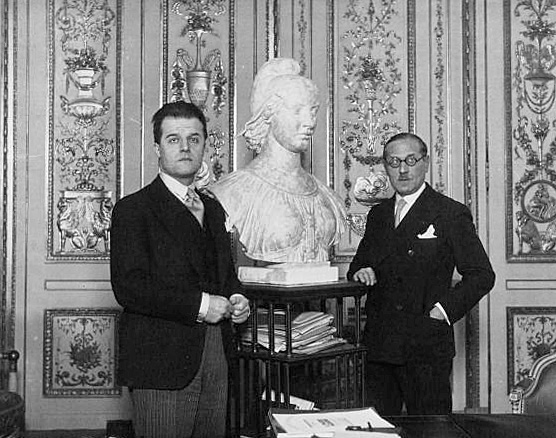
Pierre-Marie Poisson in front of his bust of Marianne

In 1933 Poisson a bust of "Marianne", the symbol of the French Republic and this was made available for sale by the Musée du Louvre. A version can for example be seen in Arpajon in Essonne.

=== Commemorative plaque for the laiterie et fromagerie industrielles du Gâteau ===
This plaque in honour of Eugène Pérault can be seen in the "Maison-Neuve" in Saint-Loup-Lamairé in Deux-Sèvres. It is thought to date to 1921.

=== Medals ===
Poisson was an accomplished medalist.

==== Musee du quai Branly ====
This museum hold several bronze Poisson medals. One, dating to 1930. celebrates agricultural progress in Algeria.

=== Bust of Delphin Sagot ===
At 76 place de l'Eglise in Échiré in Deux-Sèvres is Poisson's bronze bust of Delphin Sagot executed in 1908 and cast by Hohwiller in Paris.

=== "La Seine" ===
This bronze study for Poisson's allegory of the river Seine can be seen in the Musée d’Agesci in Niort. The original three-metre-high (9.8 ft) statue decorated the ocean liner "Ile-de-France"'s dining room.

=== Monument to Antoine Proust ===
At Saint-Maixent-l'Ecole in Deux Sevres one can see this Poisson work of 1909.

=== Le Havre railway station ===
A bronze Poisson bas-relief which originally decorated the station bell-tower can now be seen inside the station.

== Decoration for ocean liners ==
=== The ocean liner "France" ===
Poisson's bas-relief "la Fête chez les Ouled-Nail", executed in 1912, was part of the decoration of "France"'s "salle mauresque".

=== The ocean liner "Ile-de-France" ===
Working with Albert Pommier in 1927 he completed two of the four reliefs for the "grand salon" these symbolizing the four great French rivers, l'Aisne, l'Oise, la Marne et la Seine. The Musée Municipal Bernard d'Agesci in Niort have the plaster models for the "Ile-de-France" work.

=== The ocean liner "Normandie" ===
In 1935, and working with fellow sculptors Drivier and Pommier he worked on reliefs for the "Normandie"'s dining room.

== War memorials ==
=== The Le Havre War Memorial ===
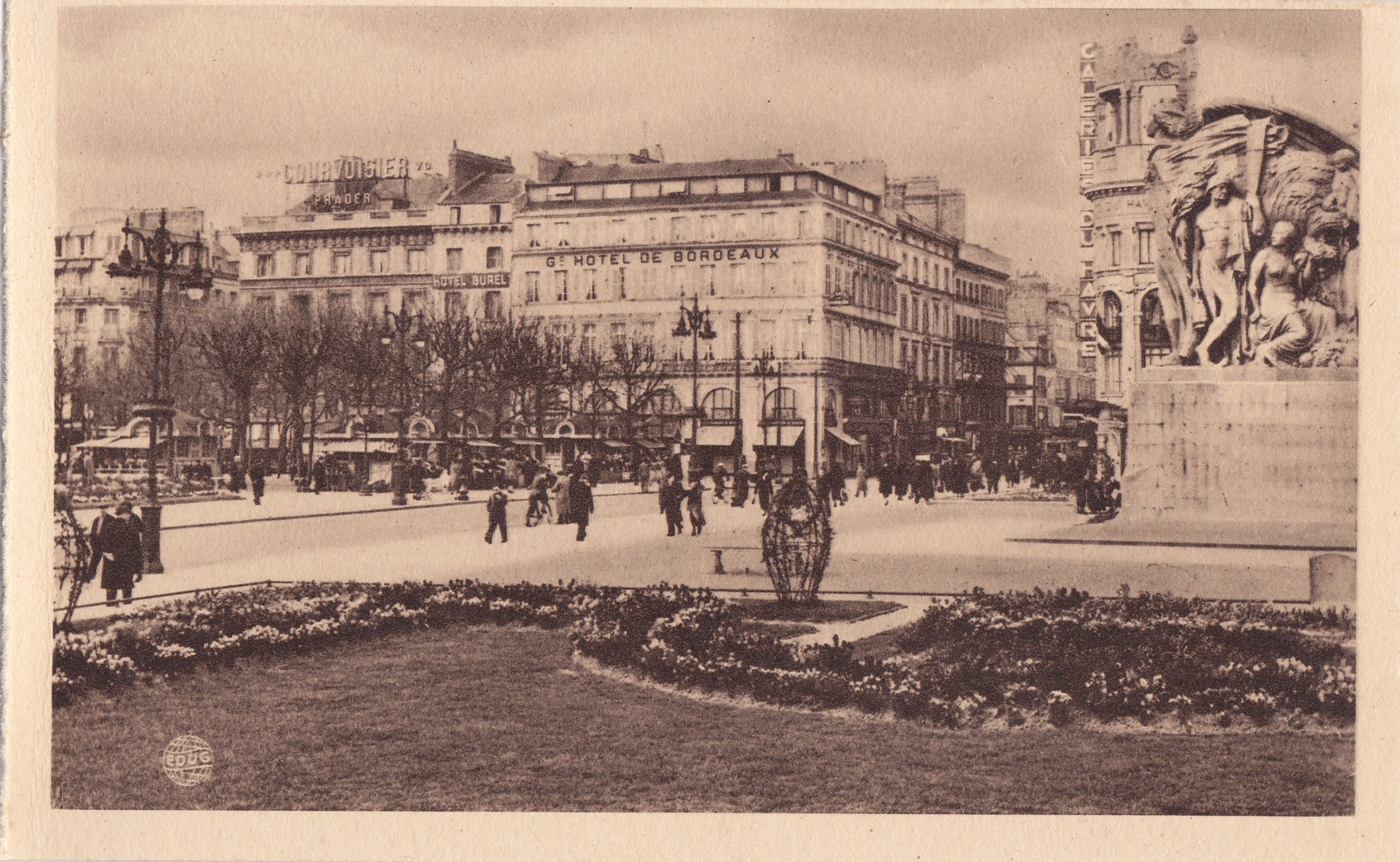
In this photograph we see part of the Le Havre war memorial

It took Poisson three years to complete this monumental work measuring 10 metres in length 5 metres in width and 6 metres high and it was a miracle that it emerged undamaged from the devastating bombing of Le Havre in the 1939-1940 war. This monument, considered by many to be the most outstanding of the many memorials erected after the 1914-1918 war, concentrates on two figures, that of "Victory" and "Grief". The figure of "Victory" stands defiantly against the headwinds almost as the prow of a ship, her enormous wings enveloping and protecting the figures grouped around it and at the rear of Poisson's composition is the figure of "Douleur"; Poisson contrasts the euphoria of victory with a veiled woman depicting the despair, misery and sorrow left by the loss of so many lives. She is accompanied by a widow and a young girl who has lost her future husband.

It was in February 1921 that the Le Havre municipality launched a competition to choose an architect and sculptor for the proposed war memorial and Pierre-Marie Poisson was chosen to carry out the sculptural work involved. The composition has various figures grouped around a central female allegory for "Victory". The figures on the northern side represent martial virtues with neo-classical warriors and a wounded soldier whilst the southern group cover the civilian virtues with a depiction of a fisherman, a woman holding grapes signifying agricultural abundance and a mother who holds up her child, a symbol of motherhood. The memorial stands in the Place de Gaulle. It was inaugurated on 3 August 1924. To the names of those who perished in the 1914-1918 war, almost 6,000 in total, have been added the victims of the 1939-1945 conflict and those lost in France's colonial wars. The memorial is also known as the "Monument de la Victoire".

=== Niort War memorial ===
The Chauvigny stone war memorial was commissioned in 1922 and inauguration took place in July 1923. It is located in Niort's place du Donjon.

The names of 564 men are listed on the memorial, all casualties of the 1914-1918 war and in the memorial's centre is a "Marianne" sculpture by Poisson. She stands with each arm spread along the top of the wall on which the names are inscribed. She wears a long robe, a "phrygien" bonnet, sandals and holds a sword. One critic wrote

"La superposition de différentes techniques (gravure de la liste des morts, robe en moyen relief, bras et tête de la République en ronde-bosse) fait de ce monument une oeuvre exceptionelle"

The inscription on the memorial reads

"A nos morts et anciens combattants et victimes de guerre des Deux-Sèvres 1952-1962 - Tunisie Maroc Algérie - Aux Harkis Morts pour la France"
