= Sainte-Néomaye =

- Commune
- Location of Sainte-Néomaye
- Location within France Location within Nouvelle-Aquitaine
- Coordinates: 46°22′26″N 0°15′26″W
- Country: France
- Region: Nouvelle-Aquitaine
- Department: Deux-Sèvres
- Arrondissement: Niort
- Canton: Saint-Maixent-l'École

Government
  - Mayor (2020–2026): Roger Largeaud
- Area^{1}: 10.69 km^{2} (4.13 sq mi)
- Elevation: 63 m (207 ft)
- Highest elevation: 142 m (466 ft)
- Lowest elevation: 42 m (138 ft)
- Population (2023): 1,359
  - Density: 127.1/km^{2} (329.3/sq mi)
- Time zone: UTC+01:00 (CET)
  - Summer (DST): UTC+02:00 (CEST)
- INSEE/Postal code: 79283 /79260
- ^{1} French Land Register data, which excludes lakes, ponds, glaciers > 1 km^{2} (0.386 sq mi or 247 acres) and river estuaries.

Sainte-Néomaye is a commune in the Deux-Sèvres department in western France. It has 1,324 inhabitants (2018). They are called Neomadiens.

== Villages ==
Sainte-Neomaye is composed of several villages:

- Sainte-Neomaye (le Bourg)
- La Chesnaye
- Aiript
- Les Fontenelles
- La Corbeliere
- Fontramier

Each village has its own identity, and its own particularities.

== Traditions ==
A legend says that Sainte-Neomaye takes his name from a young a very virtuous woman, Neomaye, who was promised, against her will, to a local ugly lord. Rather than accepting the wedding, and in order to keep her virtue, she asked that her foot be changed in a goose leg, and was fulfilled after she dived it in a source. This source is still said to have some magic power.

Sainte-Neomaye has been famous for its Donkey Fair (La Foire aux Mules) since the 18th century. Nowadays, this social event still takes place on the gorgeous central square of the village, but is less about commerce, and more about entertainment.

At this occasion, a race, "Les Chemins du Roy", takes place around the village, through tiny paths used, a long time ago, by donkey merchants.

== Geography ==
Sainte-Neomaye is located in the south-east of Deux-Sèvres. It is 14 km east of Niort, 60 km south-west of Poitiers. The town is crossed by several rivers. The most important is the Sèvre Niortaise. Sainte-Néomaye is very accessible, only 2 hours 15 minutes from Paris via TGV, and 2 hours from Bordeaux by car. It is also very close from Poitiers and its malls and universities (60 km), and La Rochelle and the Atlantic Ocean.

== Architecture ==
- The roman church was built in the 12th century and has been recently renovated.
- The castle of Sainte-Neomaye is a manor built in the 19th century.
- The castle of Les Fontenelles is a nice example of romantic architecture from the 19th century.
- Sainte-Neomaye's central square is also well known for the beautiful houses erected on its sides. These very typical Poitevin houses used to be hostels. The square is planted with trees and has large grass areas.

== See also ==
- Communes of the Deux-Sèvres department
