= Sainte-Eanne =

- Commune
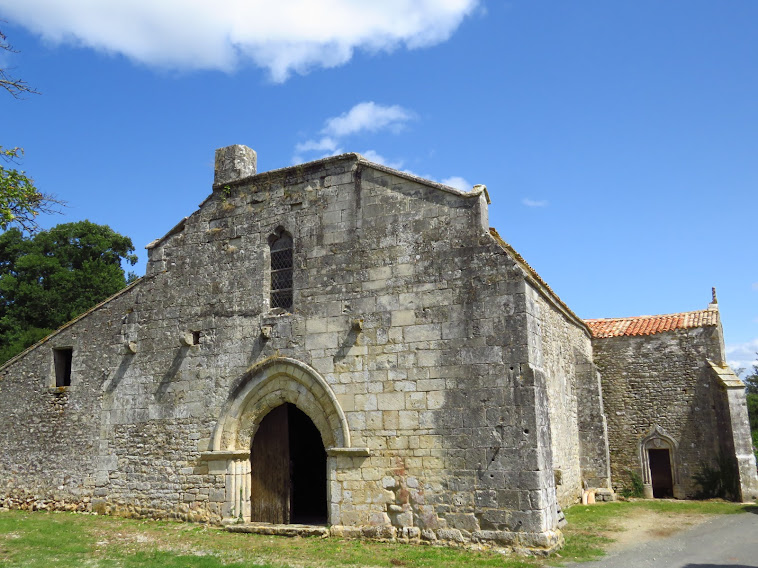
- A church in Sainte-Eanne
- Location of Sainte-Eanne
- Location within France Location within Nouvelle-Aquitaine
- Coordinates: 46°23′59″N 0°08′06″W
- Country: France
- Region: Nouvelle-Aquitaine
- Department: Deux-Sèvres
- Arrondissement: Niort
- Canton: Saint-Maixent-l'École

Government
  - Mayor (2020–2026): Patrice Auzuret
- Area^{1}: 13.83 km^{2} (5.34 sq mi)
- Elevation: 73 m (240 ft)
- Highest elevation: 159 m (522 ft)
- Lowest elevation: 60 m (200 ft)
- Population (2023): 580
  - Density: 42/km^{2} (110/sq mi)
- Demonym: Emmeranais·e
- Time zone: UTC+01:00 (CET)
  - Summer (DST): UTC+02:00 (CEST)
- INSEE/Postal code: 79246 /79800
- ^{1} French Land Register data, which excludes lakes, ponds, glaciers > 1 km^{2} (0.386 sq mi or 247 acres) and river estuaries.

Sainte-Eanne (French pronunciation: [sɛ̃tean]), also spelled Sainte-Éanne, is a commune in the French department of Deux-Sèvres, region of Nouvelle-Aquitaine (before 2015: Poitou-Charentes), western France.

== See also ==
- Communes of the Deux-Sèvres department
