= Augé, Deux-Sèvres =

Augé
- Commune
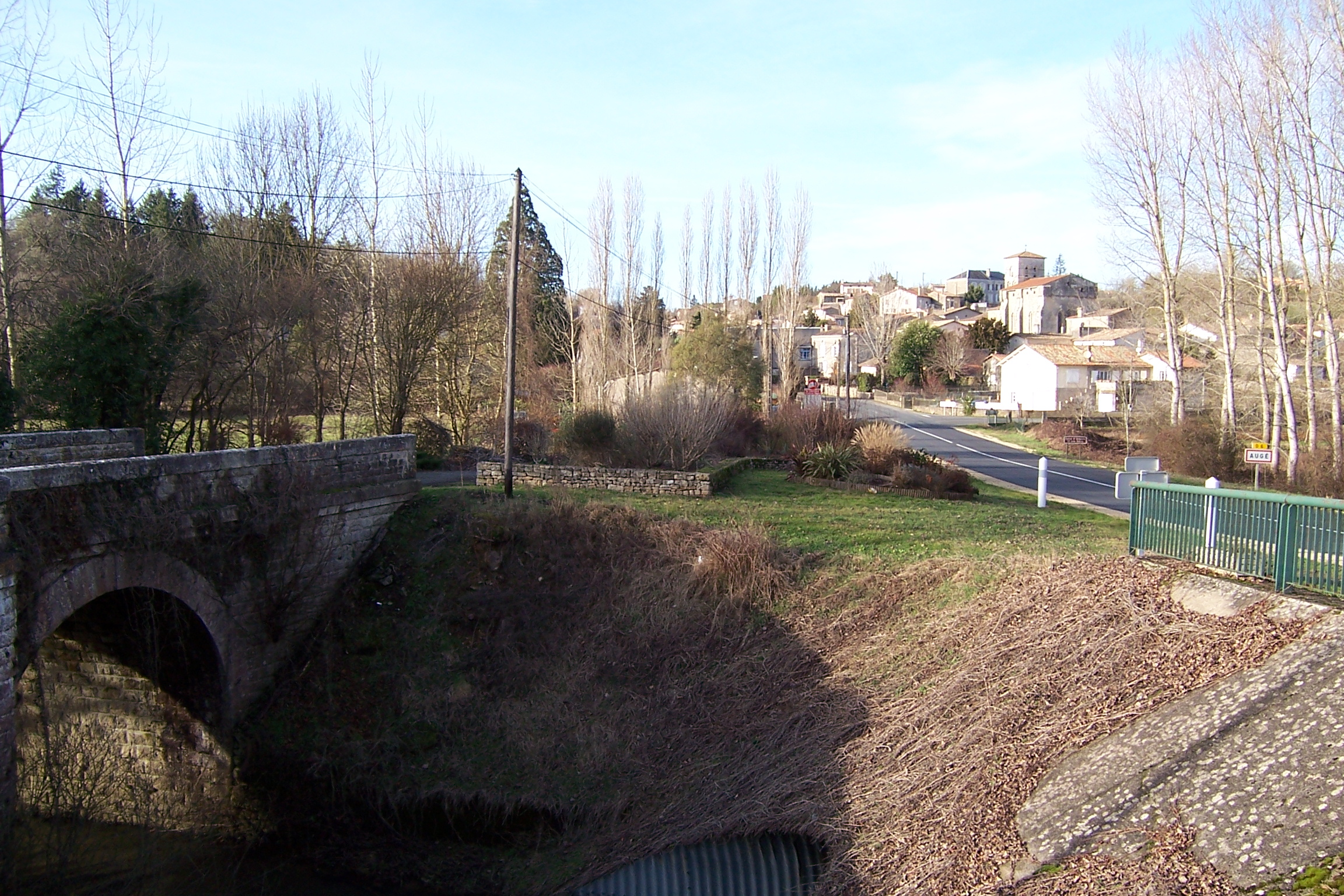
- The road into Augé

- Coat of arms
- Location of Augé
- Location within France Location within Nouvelle-Aquitaine
- Coordinates: 46°26′23″N 0°17′10″W
- Country: France
- Region: Nouvelle-Aquitaine
- Department: Deux-Sèvres
- Arrondissement: Niort
- Canton: Saint-Maixent-l'École
- Intercommunality: CC Haut Val Sèvre

Government
  - Mayor (2020–2026): Laurent Baloge
- Area^{1}: 23.33 km^{2} (9.01 sq mi)
- Highest elevation: 189 m (620 ft)
- Lowest elevation: 49 m (161 ft)
- Population (2023): 892
  - Density: 38.2/km^{2} (99.0/sq mi)
- Time zone: UTC+01:00 (CET)
  - Summer (DST): UTC+02:00 (CEST)
- INSEE/Postal code: 79020 /79400
- ^{1} French Land Register data, which excludes lakes, ponds, glaciers > 1 km^{2} (0.386 sq mi or 247 acres) and river estuaries.

Augé (French pronunciation: [oʒe]) is a commune in the Deux-Sèvres department in the Nouvelle-Aquitaine region in western France.

== See also ==
- Communes of the Deux-Sèvres department
