= Nanteuil =

Nanteuil, Deux Sevres
- Commune
- Coat of arms
- Location of Nanteuil, Deux Sevres
- Location within France Location within Nouvelle-Aquitaine
- Coordinates: 46°24′45″N 0°10′19″W
- Country: France
- Region: Nouvelle-Aquitaine
- Department: Deux-Sèvres
- Arrondissement: Niort
- Canton: Saint-Maixent-l'École

Government
  - Mayor (2023–2026): Alain Bordage
- Area^{1}: 20.62 km^{2} (7.96 sq mi)
- Elevation: 66 m (217 ft)
- Highest elevation: 182 m (597 ft)
- Lowest elevation: 55 m (180 ft)
- Population (2023): 1,684
  - Density: 81.67/km^{2} (211.5/sq mi)
- Time zone: UTC+01:00 (CET)
  - Summer (DST): UTC+02:00 (CEST)
- INSEE/Postal code: 79189 /79400
- ^{1} French Land Register data, which excludes lakes, ponds, glaciers > 1 km^{2} (0.386 sq mi or 247 acres) and river estuaries.

Nanteuil (French pronunciation: [nɑ̃tœj]) is a commune of the Deux-Sèvres department in western France.

== See also ==
- Communes of the Deux-Sèvres department
