= Romans, Deux-Sèvres =

Romans
- Commune
- Location of Romans
- Location within France Location within Nouvelle-Aquitaine
- Coordinates: 46°21′30″N 0°13′33″W
- Country: France
- Region: Nouvelle-Aquitaine
- Department: Deux-Sèvres
- Arrondissement: Niort
- Canton: Saint-Maixent-l'École

Government
  - Mayor (2020–2026): Daniel Jollit
- Area^{1}: 11.42 km^{2} (4.41 sq mi)
- Elevation: 111 m (364 ft)
- Highest elevation: 149 m (489 ft)
- Lowest elevation: 55 m (180 ft)
- Population (2023): 690
  - Density: 60/km^{2} (160/sq mi)
- Time zone: UTC+01:00 (CET)
  - Summer (DST): UTC+02:00 (CEST)
- INSEE/Postal code: 79231 /79260
- ^{1} French Land Register data, which excludes lakes, ponds, glaciers > 1 km^{2} (0.386 sq mi or 247 acres) and river estuaries.

Romans (French pronunciation: [ʁɔmɑ̃]) is a commune in the Deux-Sèvres department in western France.

== See also ==
- Communes of the Deux-Sèvres department
