= François, Deux-Sèvres =

François
- Commune
- Location of François
- Location within France Location within Nouvelle-Aquitaine
- Coordinates: 46°23′03″N 0°20′20″W
- Country: France
- Region: Nouvelle-Aquitaine
- Department: Deux-Sèvres
- Arrondissement: Niort
- Canton: Saint-Maixent-l'École
- Intercommunality: Haut Val de Sèvre

Government
  - Mayor (2020–2026): Joël Cosset
- Area^{1}: 9.39 km^{2} (3.63 sq mi)
- Elevation: 36 m (118 ft)
- Highest elevation: 81 m (266 ft)
- Lowest elevation: 34 m (112 ft)
- Population (2023): 999
  - Density: 106/km^{2} (276/sq mi)
- Time zone: UTC+01:00 (CET)
  - Summer (DST): UTC+02:00 (CEST)
- INSEE/Postal code: 79128 /79260
- ^{1} French Land Register data, which excludes lakes, ponds, glaciers > 1 km^{2} (0.386 sq mi or 247 acres) and river estuaries.

François (pronounced [fʁɑ̃.swa]) is a commune in the Deux-Sèvres department in the Nouvelle-Aquitaine region in western France.

== See also ==
- Communes of the Deux-Sèvres department
