= Exireuil =

- Commune
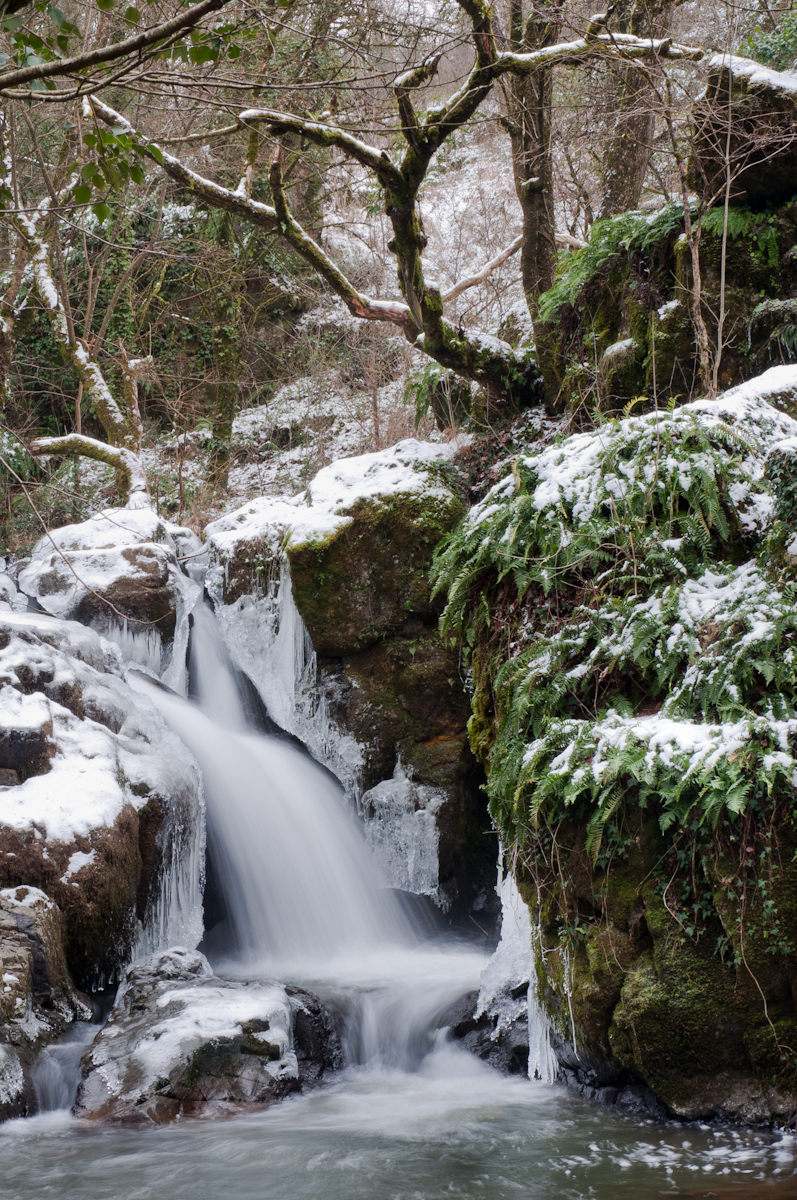
- The Puits d'Enfer waterfall in the snow
- Location of Exireuil
- Location within France Location within Nouvelle-Aquitaine
- Coordinates: 46°26′03″N 0°11′26″W
- Country: France
- Region: Nouvelle-Aquitaine
- Department: Deux-Sèvres
- Arrondissement: Niort
- Canton: Saint-Maixent-l'École

Government
  - Mayor (2020–2026): Jérôme Billerot
- Area^{1}: 21.06 km^{2} (8.13 sq mi)
- Elevation: 145 m (476 ft)
- Highest elevation: 191 m (627 ft)
- Lowest elevation: 59 m (194 ft)
- Population (2023): 1,578
  - Density: 74.93/km^{2} (194.1/sq mi)
- Time zone: UTC+01:00 (CET)
  - Summer (DST): UTC+02:00 (CEST)
- INSEE/Postal code: 79114 /79400
- ^{1} French Land Register data, which excludes lakes, ponds, glaciers > 1 km^{2} (0.386 sq mi or 247 acres) and river estuaries.

Exireuil (French pronunciation: [eɡziʁœj], [ɛɡziʁœj]; Latin: Exirolium) is a commune in the Deux-Sèvres department, region of Nouvelle-Aquitaine, western France.

== See also ==
- Communes of the Deux-Sèvres department
