= Azay-le-Brûlé =

- Commune
- Location of Azay-le-Brûlé
- Location within France Location within Nouvelle-Aquitaine
- Coordinates: 46°24′04″N 0°14′53″W
- Country: France
- Region: Nouvelle-Aquitaine
- Department: Deux-Sèvres
- Arrondissement: Niort
- Canton: Saint-Maixent-l'École
- Intercommunality: CC Haut Val Sèvre

Government
  - Mayor (2020–2026): Jean-François Renoux
- Area^{1}: 22.1 km^{2} (8.5 sq mi)
- Elevation: 78 m (256 ft)
- Highest elevation: 131 m (430 ft)
- Lowest elevation: 41 m (135 ft)
- Population (2023): 1,927
  - Density: 87.2/km^{2} (226/sq mi)
- Time zone: UTC+01:00 (CET)
  - Summer (DST): UTC+02:00 (CEST)
- INSEE/Postal code: 79024 /79400
- ^{1} French Land Register data, which excludes lakes, ponds, glaciers > 1 km^{2} (0.386 sq mi or 247 acres) and river estuaries.

Azay-le-Brûlé (French pronunciation: [azɛ lə bʁyle]) is a commune in the Deux-Sèvres department in the Nouvelle-Aquitaine region in western France.

== See also ==
- Communes of the Deux-Sèvres department
