= Canton of Saint-Maixent-l'École =

Coordinates: 46.41°N 0.21°W

The canton of Saint-Maixent-l'École is an administrative division of the Deux-Sèvres department, western France. It was created at the French canton reorganisation which came into effect in March 2015. Its seat is in Saint-Maixent-l'École.

It consists of the following communes:

1. Augé
2. Azay-le-Brûlé
3. La Crèche
4. Exireuil
5. François
6. Nanteuil
7. Romans
8. Sainte-Eanne
9. Sainte-Néomaye
10. Saint-Maixent-l'École
11. Saint-Martin-de-Saint-Maixent
12. Saivres
13. Souvigné
