= Souvigné, Deux-Sèvres =

Souvigné
- Commune
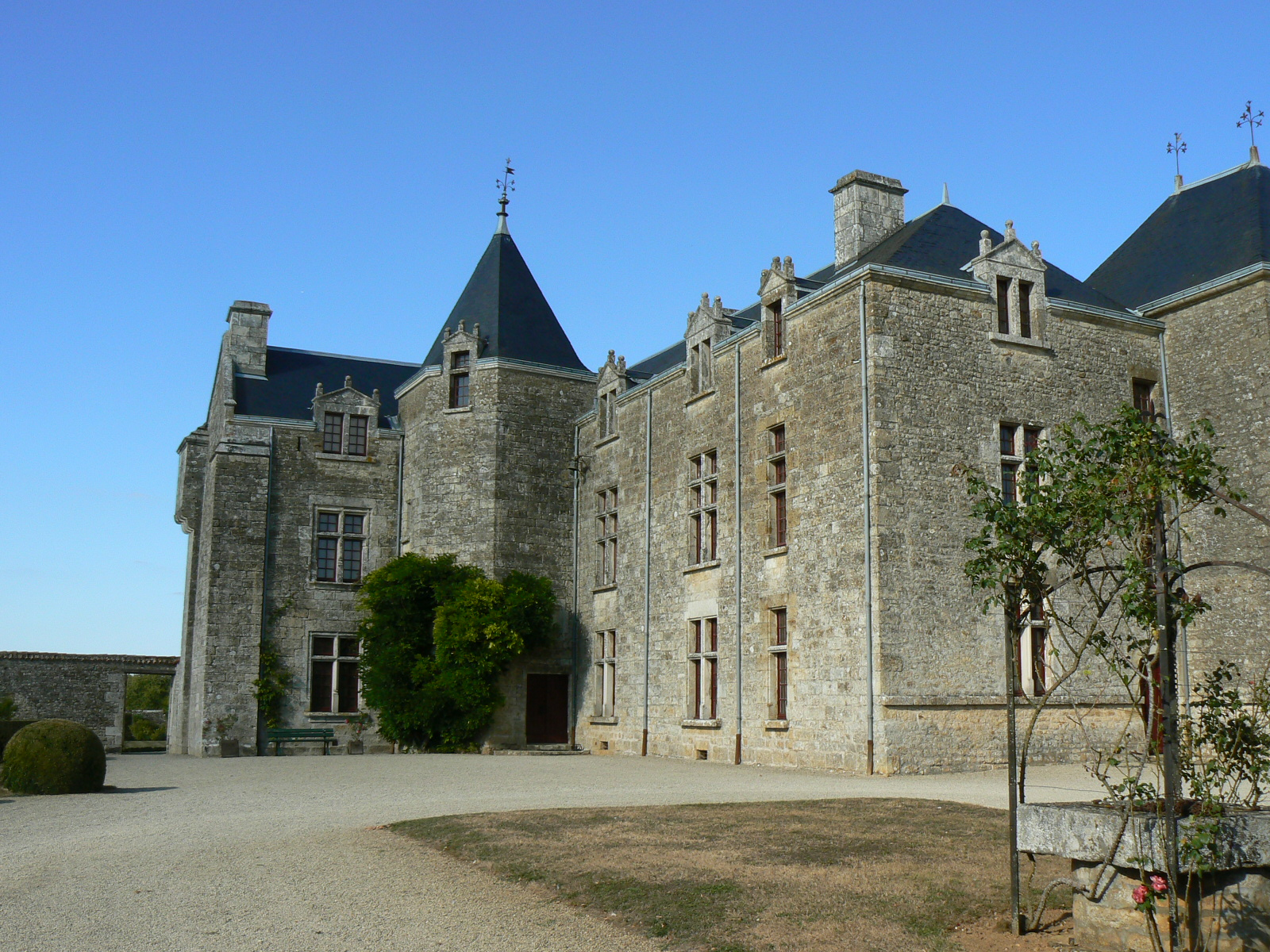
- The Château of Reigné
- Location of Souvigné
- Location within France Location within Nouvelle-Aquitaine
- Coordinates: 46°22′27″N 0°11′10″W
- Country: France
- Region: Nouvelle-Aquitaine
- Department: Deux-Sèvres
- Arrondissement: Niort
- Canton: Saint-Maixent-l'École

Government
  - Mayor (2020–2026): Michel Ricordel
- Area^{1}: 26.41 km^{2} (10.20 sq mi)
- Elevation: 120 m (390 ft)
- Highest elevation: 176 m (577 ft)
- Lowest elevation: 62 m (203 ft)
- Population (2023): 863
  - Density: 32.7/km^{2} (84.6/sq mi)
- Time zone: UTC+01:00 (CET)
  - Summer (DST): UTC+02:00 (CEST)
- INSEE/Postal code: 79319 /79800
- ^{1} French Land Register data, which excludes lakes, ponds, glaciers > 1 km^{2} (0.386 sq mi or 247 acres) and river estuaries.

Souvigné is a commune in the Deux-Sèvres department in western France.

== See also ==
- Communes of the Deux-Sèvres department
