= Saint-Martin-de-Saint-Maixent =

- Commune
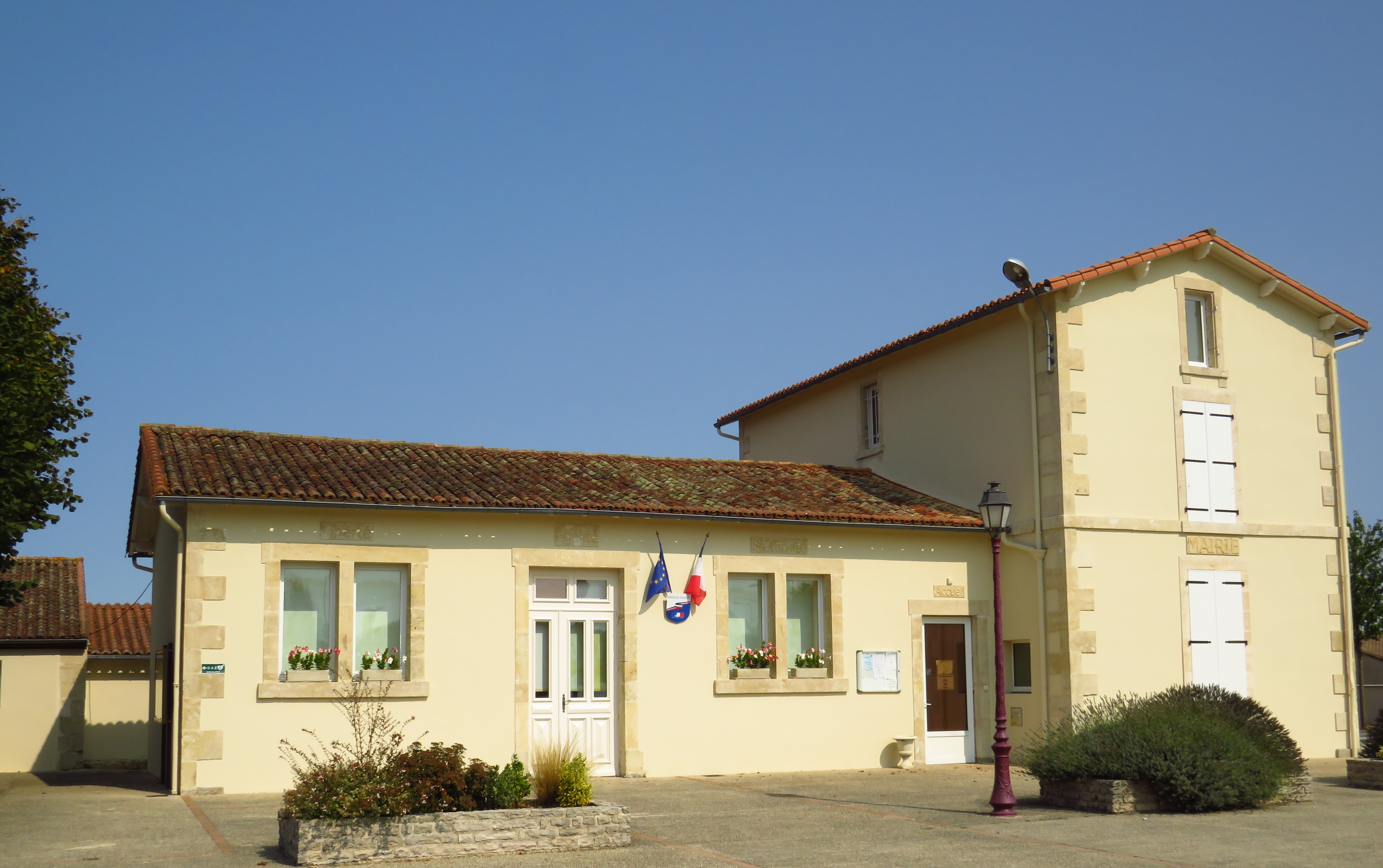
- Town hall
- Location of Saint-Martin-de-Saint-Maixent
- Location within France Location within Nouvelle-Aquitaine
- Coordinates: 46°23′49″N 0°12′02″W
- Country: France
- Region: Nouvelle-Aquitaine
- Department: Deux-Sèvres
- Arrondissement: Niort
- Canton: Saint-Maixent-l'École

Government
  - Mayor (2020–2026): Angélique Camara
- Area^{1}: 12.64 km^{2} (4.88 sq mi)
- Elevation: 128 m (420 ft)
- Highest elevation: 141 m (463 ft)
- Lowest elevation: 47 m (154 ft)
- Population (2023): 1,062
  - Density: 84.02/km^{2} (217.6/sq mi)
- Time zone: UTC+01:00 (CET)
  - Summer (DST): UTC+02:00 (CEST)
- INSEE/Postal code: 79276 /79400
- ^{1} French Land Register data, which excludes lakes, ponds, glaciers > 1 km^{2} (0.386 sq mi or 247 acres) and river estuaries.

Saint-Martin-de-Saint-Maixent (French pronunciation: [sɛ̃ maʁtɛ̃ də sɛ̃ mɛksɑ̃], literally Saint-Martin of Saint-Maixent) is a commune in the Deux-Sèvres department in western France.

== See also ==
- Communes of the Deux-Sèvres department
