= Saint-Maixent-l'École =

- Commune
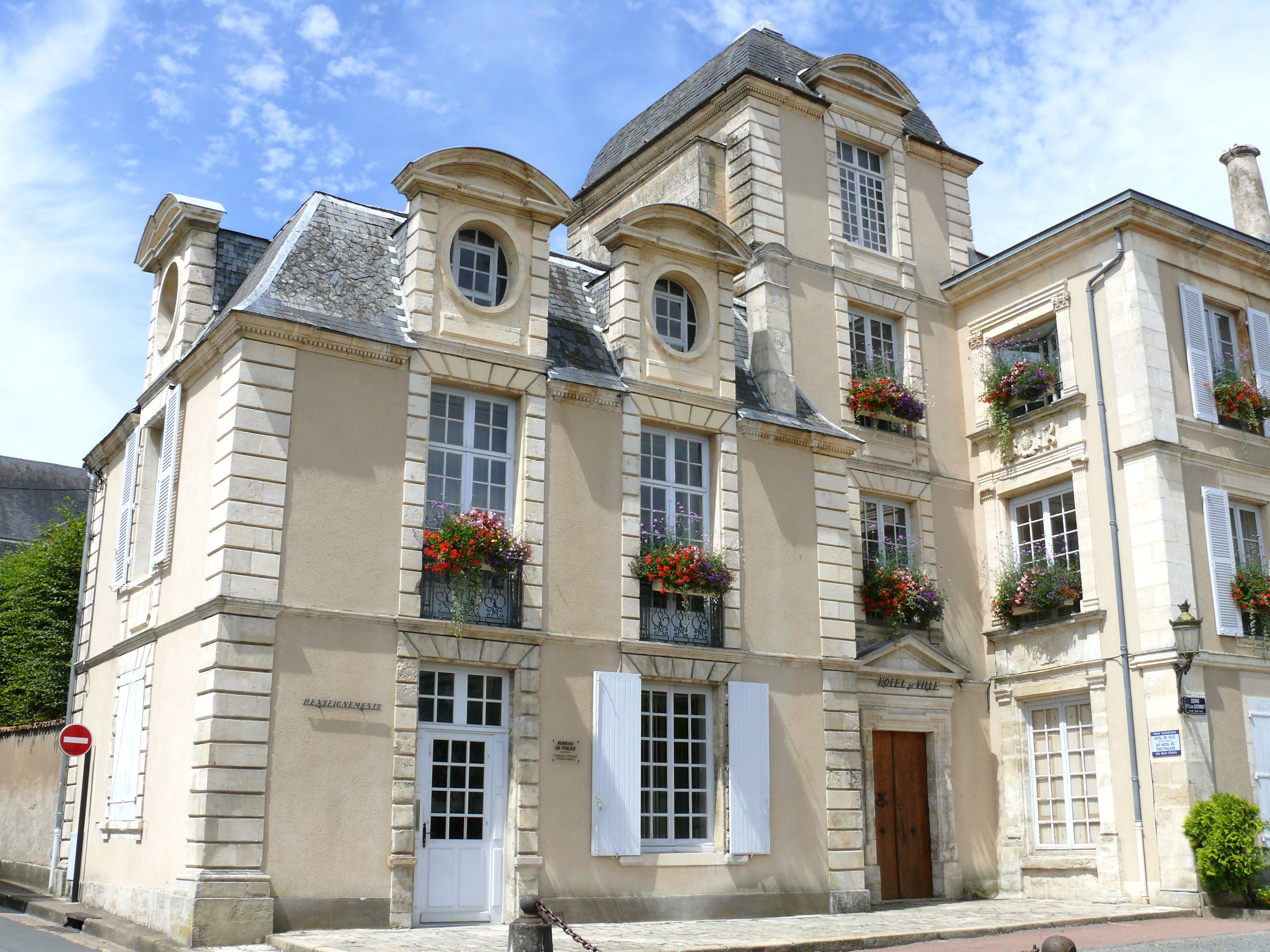
- The town hall in Saint-Maixent-l'École

- Coat of arms
- Location of Saint-Maixent-l'École
- Location within France Location within Nouvelle-Aquitaine
- Coordinates: 46°24′49″N 0°12′25″W
- Country: France
- Region: Nouvelle-Aquitaine
- Department: Deux-Sèvres
- Arrondissement: Niort
- Canton: Saint-Maixent-l'École

Government
  - Mayor (2020–2026): Stéphane Baudry
- Area^{1}: 5.22 km^{2} (2.02 sq mi)
- Elevation: 74 m (243 ft)
- Highest elevation: 115 m (377 ft)
- Lowest elevation: 52 m (171 ft)
- Population (2023): 7,595
  - Density: 1,450/km^{2} (3,770/sq mi)
- Time zone: UTC+01:00 (CET)
  - Summer (DST): UTC+02:00 (CEST)
- INSEE/Postal code: 79270 /79400
- ^{1} French Land Register data, which excludes lakes, ponds, glaciers > 1 km^{2} (0.386 sq mi or 247 acres) and river estuaries.

Saint-Maixent-l'École (French pronunciation: [sɛ̃ mɛksɑ̃ lekɔl]) is a commune in the department of Deux-Sèvres, region of Nouvelle-Aquitaine (before 2015: Poitou-Charentes), western France.

== Geography ==
Saint-Maixent-l'École is located in the Haut Val de Sèvre area of western France, about 15 miles (24 km) from Niort and 40 miles (64 km) from La Rochelle. The town sits in a fertile and sheltered south-facing valley with a branch of the River Sevre running through it.

It enjoys a pleasant micro-climate – often being between 2 °C and 5 °C warmer than the surrounding hilltops – and sits in a predominantly rural landscape. The town is close to the autoroute networks and is well served by its own station, known to SNCF as 'St. Maixent Deux Sèvres'. SNCF-TGV and TER local trains run to Angoulême, Bordeaux, La Rochelle, Lille, Montauban, Niort, Paris, Poitiers and Tours.

== History ==
The town was founded in 459 by the Oratorian monk, Agapit. Agapit originally named the town Saint Saturnin. He would later be joined by Maixent, a fellow monk in 480. Later, during the Wars of Religion, St. Maixent was cast into the role of 'border town' between the Protestant strongholds around to the west and Catholic France to the east.

== Population ==
Historical population
Year	Pop.	±% p.a.
1968	7,706	—
1975	7,973	+0.49%
1982	7,515	−0.84%
1990	6,893	−1.07%
1999	6,602	−0.48%
2007	7,590	+1.76%
2012	6,852	−2.03%
2017	6,982	+0.38%
2023	7,595	+1.41%
Source: INSEE

== Sights ==
Many of the town's buildings date from 15th century through the early 19th century. The town is home to a large abbey which dominates the skyline. The abbey houses the tombs of St. Maixent and St. Leger. The limestone that was used for many of the buildings was excavated from an extensive network of (what have become) vaulted cellars. These often extend down for two stories below ground and may be very large. Oldest secular premises in the town is the ancient Pharmacy on Rue Anatole France which has been undergoing a slow but dedicated restoration of its many hidden features.

Rue Chalon, the pedestrianized main shopping street was extensively rebuilt during the 18th century under the supervision of Count Blossac, Intendant of the Generalitat of Poitou. The entrance to Rue Chalon is signified by a masonry arch (Porte Chalon) and the street beyond has a uniform facade of handsome period buildings with shops, bars and restaurants facing onto the street. The far end of Rue Chalon ends with a prospect of the Abbey. A relic of 'Old France' stands on this corner. Built in the 18th century upon the site of the Abbey Seminary, the 12th-century cellarage below the shop was (probably) originally created by masons seeking out limestone from which the Abbey was constructed.

Rue Churay, just off this street has small public garden which contains the town's war memorial, and is regularly the site of ceremonies of remembrance. Attended by the town band at these affairs also offer an opportunity to see soldiers studying at St. Maixent's famous 'École de l'Armée' in full dress. While unremarkable from the outside, one of the houses opposite the war memorial has a virtually intact lace-maker's house dating from the 12th to 14th centuries in a courtyard at the rear. This unusual survivor from the period when Poitou lace was famous throughout Europe has the large north-light window with stone window-seat typical of its kind.

== Economy ==
The main agricultural products of the region around the town includes corn, sunflowers, flax, tobacco, and wine. Sugar Beet and Charente Melons also feature prominently. The town lies halfway between the Loire Valley and Bordeaux, in close proximity to the Cognac region. There are several specialty goats-milk cheeses produced in the area. The area is home to companies producing agricultural commodities, such as animal feed and vegetable oils.

One of the mainstays of the local economy is the presence of the French Army NCO training school, which runs regular courses for all branches of the Army. There are extensive barracks, some parts dating back to the revolution.

There is a thriving Saturday market on the main street, a Food Hall on the market square, as well as branches of the usual supermarket chains and once a small cinema (L'Hermitage), which closed in 2012. 2014 has seen the opening of a new cultural center, the 'Agapit', which hosts musical and theatrical performances.

== Twin towns ==
The town is twinned with Horsham in the United Kingdom. This fact is marked by the presence of an original red UK telephone kiosk outside the Mairie.

== Notable people ==
- Jacqueline Ficini (1923-1988), researcher and professor of chemistry

== See also ==
- Communes of the Deux-Sèvres department
- Pierre-Marie Poisson
- Aristide DENFERT-ROCHEREAU est né le 11 janvier 1823 à St Maixent l'École. Il a dirigé la défense de la ville de Belfort pendant la guerre franco-allemande de 1870, ce qui lui a valu le surnom de "Lion de Belfort".
