= Alsace-class battleship =

Planned class of French battleships

- Illustration of the No. 3 variant

Class overview
- Name: Alsace class
- Preceded by: Richelieu class
- Succeeded by: None
- Planned: 2
- Completed: 0

General characteristics (No. 1 design)
- Type: Fast battleship
- Displacement: Standard: 40,000 long tons (41,000 t); Normal: 44,800 long tons (45,500 t)
- Length: 252 m (827 ft)
- Beam: 35 m (114 ft 10 in)
- Installed power: 170,000 shp (130,000 kW)
- Speed: 31 knots (57 km/h; 36 mph)
- Armament: 3 × triple 380 mm (15 in) guns; 3 × triple 152 mm (6 in) guns; 8 × twin 100 mm (3.9 in) AA guns; ?? × 37 mm (1.5 in) AA guns; ?? x 25 mm (0.98 in) AA guns
- Armor: Belt: 330 mm (13 in); Upper deck: 170 to 180 mm (6.7 to 7.1 in); Lower deck: 40 mm (1.6 in)

General characteristics (No. 2 design)
- Displacement: Standard: 42,500 long tons (43,200 t); Normal: 47,000 long tons (47,800 t)
- Length: 256 m (840 ft)
- Beam: 35.5 m (116 ft 6 in)
- Installed power: 190,000 shp (140,000 kW)
- Speed: 31 knots
- Armament: 3 × triple 406 mm (16 in) guns; 3 × triple 152 mm guns; 8 × twin 100 mm AA guns; ?? × 37 mm AA guns; ?? x 25 mm AA guns
- Armor: Belt: 330 mm; Upper deck: 170–180 mm; Deck: 40 mm

General characteristics (No. 3 design)
- Displacement: Standard: 45,000 long tons (46,000 t); Normal: 50,700 long tons (51,500 t)
- Length: 265 m (869 ft)
- Beam: 35.5 m
- Installed power: 220,000 shp (160,000 kW)
- Speed: 32 knots (59 km/h; 37 mph)
- Armament: 3 × quadruple 380 mm guns; 3 × triple 152 mm guns; 12 × twin 100 mm AA guns; ?? × 37 mm AA guns; ?? x 25 mm AA guns
- Armor: Belt: 350 mm (13.8 in); Upper deck: 170–180 mm; Deck: 40 mm

The Alsace class was a pair of fast battleships planned by the French Navy in the late 1930s in response to German plans to build two H-class battleships after the Second London Naval Treaty collapsed. The Alsace design was based on variants of the Richelieu class, and three proposals were submitted by the design staff. The proposed armament included nine or twelve 380 mm (15 in) guns or nine 406 mm (16 in) guns, but no choice was definitively made before the program ended in mid-1940. According to one pair of historians, logistical considerations—including the size of the 12-gun variant and the introduction of a new shell caliber for the 406 mm version—led the naval command to settle on the nine 380 mm design. But another pair of authors disagree, believing that the difficulty of designing and manufacturing a three-gun turret would have caused prohibitive delays during wartime, making the third, largest variant the most likely to have been built. The ships would have forced the French government to make significant improvements to its harbor and shipyard facilities, as the smaller Richelieus already stretched the limitations of existing shipyards. With construction of the first member of the class scheduled for 1941, the plan was terminated by the German victory in the Battle of France in May–June 1940.

== Background and development ==
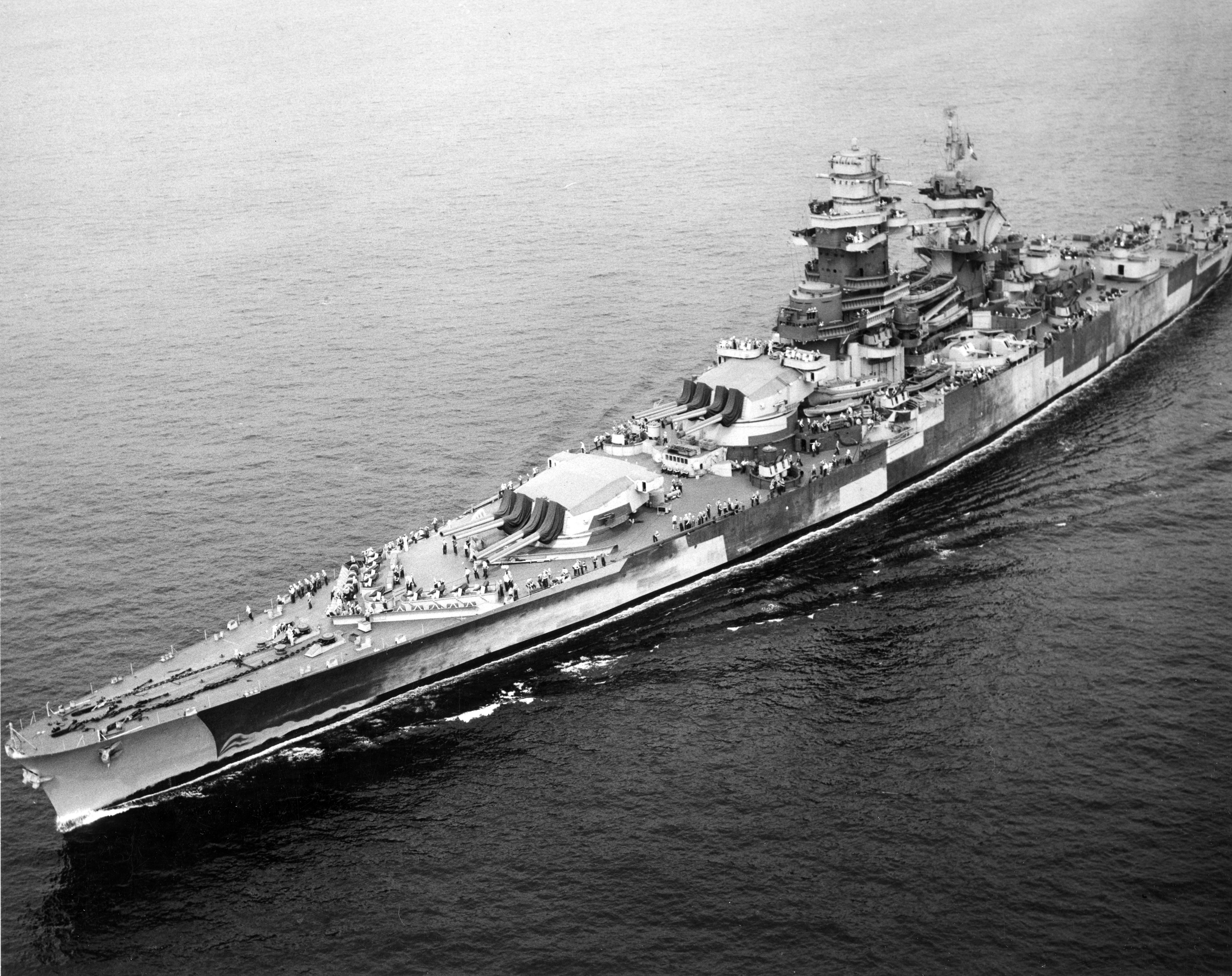
Richelieu, the previous French battleship design

France, the United Kingdom, and the United States signed the Second London Naval Treaty in 1936, though Japan and Italy both refused to do so, which effectively ended the international naval arms control regime begun with the Washington Naval Treaty of 1922. The treaty was to have reduced the caliber of new battleships' main batteries from 406 mm (16 in) to 356 mm (14 in) while retaining the original displacement limit of 35,000 long tons (36,000 t), but the US Navy insisted on an "escalator clause" that allowed a reversion to 406 mm guns if any signatory to the original naval treaties refused to sign the Second London agreement. After Japan withdrew from the conference on 15 January 1937 and refused to return, the United States invoked the clause on 31 March. A year later, the French, American, and British naval commands exchanged notes that resulted in a joint agreement on 30 June 1938 permitting construction of battleships with a displacement of up to 45,000 long tons (46,000 t).

The French naval command initially intended to remain within the original displacement limits, since existing naval infrastructure prohibited vessels larger than the Richelieu class, and even for those 35,000-ton ships, inventive measures had to be taken to build the first two vessels. The work to improve French shipyards and harbor facilities would have significantly increased the cost of building battleships up to the treaty maximum. The command assumed that only Japan and the United States would be interested in building 45,000-ton ships and so announced that it would respect the 35,000-ton limit so long as other European navies did the same. French plans were disrupted in mid-1939 when French military intelligence became aware that the German Kriegsmarine (War Navy) had begun construction of two H-class battleships in accordance with Plan Z; these were 56,000-long-ton (57,000 t) ships, though French intelligence initially believed them to be only 40,000-long-ton (41,000 t) vessels. This development led Vice-Amiral (Vice Admiral) François Darlan, the Chief of Staff of the French Navy, to order design studies for new battleships that exceeded the 35,000-ton limit. Darlan specified that the armament was to be 400 mm (15.7 in), 406 mm, or 420 mm (16.5 in).

== Infrastructure concerns ==
In the late 1930s, there were only three existing slipways capable of building large ships: The No. 4 dock at Brest and the Forme Caquot and No. 1 docks in Saint-Nazaire. The No. 4 dock was only 250 m (820 ft), too short to build any vessel larger than the Richelieus (which themselves had to be built without their bow or stern and completed after launching), and the No. 1 dock in Saint-Nazaire was already occupied with building the aircraft carrier Joffre (and was slated to begin construction of her sister Painlevé after the latter's projected launch in 1941).

To build battleships to compete with the German H-class vessels, the French Navy would need to embark on a major program to improve its infrastructure. The Laninon Docks at the Arsenal de Brest were to be significantly expanded; a new, longer dock (that would be designated Dock No. 10) that was 275 m (902 ft) long and 58 m (190 ft) wide was to be excavated, which would have been large enough to construct the Alsace class. A new 360 m (1,180 ft) long graving dock was to be built, and the existing Dock No. 9 was to be lengthened from 250 m to 300 m (980 ft). Dock No. 10 was slated to be completed by 1942, at which point work on the graving dock would begin, as budgetary limitations and a shortage of skilled workers prevented both facilities from being built at the same time. At a later date, Dock No. 10 was to be lengthened to 360 m as well.

In addition to shipbuilding facilities, the new battleships would necessitate improved repair and harbor facilities at the various major naval bases. Port facilities had already been built or were in the process of construction at Cherbourg, Toulon, Casablanca, Bizerte, and Dakar, though dry-docks in those ports were not sufficient to handle even a Richelieu in a damaged condition (where flooding would increase draft to more than 11 m (36 ft)). It was estimated that these docks would need to be dredged to at least 12 m (39 ft) to accommodate the Alsace design. The navy had to acquire other equipment, including the tugboats necessary to maneuver the ships in port and floating cranes needed to fit out the vessels, but shortages in machinery slowed construction and owing to the outbreak of World War II in September 1939, France was unable to order the vessels from neutral countries.

== Design proposals ==
Design work began in late 1939; three versions were prepared, all of which were developments of the Project C type that was created during the design process for the Clemenceau and Gascogne variants of the Richelieu class. Unlike the standard Richelieu type that mounted all eight of their main battery guns in a pair of four-gun turrets forward, the Project C design adopted an arrangement with two three-gun turrets forward and one triple turret aft. The design staff considered three standard displacements; 40,000 long tons (41,000 t), 42,500 long tons (43,200 t), and 45,000 long tons (46,000 t). The first was the same figure proposed for the British Lion-class battleships and that incorrectly assumed for the German H-class ships, the third was the maximum under the agreement reached with Britain and the United States, and the second was a compromise displacement figured to be the minimum that could accommodate the mandated top speed of at least 30 knots (56 km/h; 35 mph) along with a battery of 406 mm guns.

The first proposal for Alsace, No. 1, was essentially a slightly enlarged version of Project C. The ship had a longer hull, which required a 15,000 shaft horsepower (11,000 kW) increase in horsepower while incurring a loss of one knot in top speed. No. 2 was a scaled up version of No. 1, with the 380 mm guns replaced with 406 mm guns. The even larger hull necessitated a further increase in horsepower by 20,000 shp (15,000 kW) to maintain the same speed. The No. 3 type was enlarged further to accommodate three quadruple 380 mm turrets, though it managed to increase speed by a knot. All of the designs would have carried a light anti-aircraft battery of 37 mm (1.5 in) and 25 mm (0.98 in) guns, but the numbers and arrangements of those guns had not been finalized before the program came to an end.

Characteristics
Design	Length overall	Beam	Standard displacement	Normal displacement	Power	Speed	Belt Armor	Decks		Armament		
Design	Length overall	Beam	Standard displacement	Normal displacement	Power	Speed	Belt Armor	Upper	Lower	Primary	Secondary	Tertiary
No. 1	252 m (826 ft 9 in)	35 m (114 ft 10 in)	40,000 long tons (41,000 t)	44,800 long tons (45,500 t)	170,000 shp (130,000 kW)	31 kn (57 km/h; 36 mph)	330 mm (13 in)	170–180 mm (6.7–7.1 in)	40 mm (1.6 in)	9 × 380 mm (15 in)	9 × 152 mm (6 in)	16 × 100 mm (3.9 in)
No. 2	256 m (839 ft 11 in)	35.5 m (116 ft 6 in)	42,500 long tons (43,200 t)	47,000 long tons (47,800 t)	190,000 shp (140,000 kW)	31 kn (57 km/h; 36 mph)	330 mm (13 in)	170–180 mm (6.7–7.1 in)	40 mm (1.6 in)	9 × 406 mm (16 in)	9 × 152 mm (6 in)	16 × 100 mm (3.9 in)
No. 3	265 m (869 ft 5 in)	35.5 m (116 ft 6 in)	45,000 long tons (46,000 t)	50,700 long tons (51,500 t)	220,000 shp (160,000 kW)	32 kn (59 km/h; 37 mph)	350 mm (13.8 in)	170–180 mm (6.7–7.1 in)	40 mm (1.6 in)	12 × 380 mm	9 × 152 mm (6 in)	24 × 100 mm

Darlan and the rest of the naval command evaluated the design proposals, but the choice was obvious from the start according to the historians John Jordan and Robert Dumas. No. 2, armed with 406 mm guns, would have introduced a fourth caliber to the French battle line (after the 380 mm guns of the Richelieus, the 330 mm (13 in) guns of the Dunkerques, and the 340 mm (13.4 in) guns of the older Bretagnes). Additionally, the 406 mm gun had not yet been produced, so the necessary design work might have delayed completion of the new ships. The No. 3 type was simply too large for existing naval bases to easily accommodate. This left No. 1 as the only realistic option for the next battleship program. Historians William Garzke and Robert Dulin disagree, however, pointing out that the French Navy had never built a three-gun turret before. Building the ships under wartime constraints (and with the need to produce the ship as quickly as possible), repeating the four-gun turrets of the Richelieus made the most sense, and they argue that the No. 3 design was the most likely version to be built.

Garzke and Dulin project that a finalized No. 3 design would have had a full-load displacement of 55,125 long tons (56,010 t), which would have included lengthening the hull to 270 m (890 ft) with the same beam of 35.5 m. At these dimensions, the draft would have been 9.25 m (30.3 ft), and with 197,200 shp (147,100 kW), the ship could have been propelled at a speed of at least 30 knots. They estimate that the projected battery of twenty-four 100 mm guns would have been cut in half, in line with the other variants, and eighteen 37 mm guns would have been carried. They expect the belt would have been increased to a maximum of 360 mm (14.2 in) with an incline of 15.5 degrees from the vertical to improve its resistance to long-range fire. According to their design study, the main deck would have been reduced slightly, to 170 mm over the magazines and 150 mm (5.9 in) over the propulsion machinery spaces.

Two of the new ships were authorized on 1 April 1940. The first vessel was slated to be laid down at the No. 1 slipway at Saint-Nazaire after Joffre was to be launched in 1941, displacing Painlevé, which was not reallocated to another builder before the program ended. The second member of the class was to be laid down in 1942 in the new No. 10 dock in Brest, which was to have been completed by that time. On 15 May 1940, the navy proposed four names for the first two ships for Darlan to select; these were Alsace, Normandie, Flandre, and Bourgogne. According to Garzke and Dulin, the government considered authorizing two more vessels, though no contracts were placed. Initial orders for building material were scheduled for mid-1940, but following the German victory in the Battle of France by June, all French naval construction programs came to an end.
