= SNCAO CAO.600 =

Prototype aircraft in World War two

CAO.600
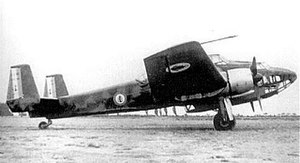

General information
- Type: Torpedo bomber/Reconnaissance aircraft
- National origin: France
- Manufacturer: SNCAO
- Primary user: French Navy
- Number built: 1

History
- First flight: 21 March 1940

The SNCAO CAO.600 was a French prototype twin-engined torpedo-bomber of the Second World War. It was intended to operate from two new aircraft carriers of the French Navy, but only a single example had been completed and flown when the surrender of France in June 1940 ended development of the aircraft.

== Design and development ==
In 1937 the French Service Technique de l'Aeronautique (or Air Ministry) launched its A47 specification to replace the Aéronavale's elderly Levasseur PL.7 torpedo-bombers and Levasseur PL.101 reconnaissance aircraft, both obsolete biplanes, aboard the French Navy's two planned new aircraft carriers, the Joffre and Painlevé. The requirement demanded that the new aircraft, which was to act as a torpedo-bomber, level bomber and reconnaissance aircraft, had to have a maximum speed of over 300 km/h (186 mph), with an endurance of 3.5 hours as a torpedo-bomber and 6 hours on reconnaissance missions. Unusually for a carrier-based aircraft, particularly for 1937, the specification demanded that the new aircraft be twin-engined, carrying a crew of two as a torpedo bomber and three as a level bomber or reconnaissance aircraft.

An order for two prototypes was placed with the Société Nationale des Constructions Aéronautiques de l'Ouest (SNCAO) on 15 June 1939, with a similar order for two of the competing design from SNCAM, the Dewoitine D.750 following on 26 July. The SNCAO design, the SNCAO CAO.600 was an all-metal monoplane with an inverted gull wing and a retractable tailwheel undercarriage. The pilot and bombardier/navigator sat in separate cockpits with individual stepped windscreens, with the navigator in the extreme nose and the pilot above the leading edge of the wing. The radio-operator/gunner sat further aft, with his cockpit behind the wing. Power was provided by two Gnome-Rhône 14M radial engines.

== Operational history ==
The first prototype made its maiden flight on 21 March 1940, being flown from Villacoublay to Istres on 31 March. It had completed 35 flying hours by 25 June when the test programme was stopped by the French surrender to Germany. The second prototype, which differed in having the folding wings required for carrier operations, was abandoned incomplete, while the first prototype was dismantled and stored until it was finally scrapped following the German occupation of Southern France in November 1942.

== Specifications ==
Data from War Planes of the Second World War:Volume Seven Bombers and Reconnaissance Aircraft

General characteristics

- Crew: 2 or 3
- Length: 12.22 m (40 ft 1 in)
- Wingspan: 16.50 m (54 ft 2 in)
- Gross weight: 4,700 kg (10,362 lb)
- Powerplant: 2 × Gnome-Rhône 14M fourteen-cylinder air-cooled radial engine, 510 kW (680 hp) each

Performance

- Maximum speed: 380 km/h (236 mph, 205 kn) at 1,500 m (4,900 ft)
- Cruise speed: 299 km/h (186 mph, 162 kn) at 1,000 m (3,300 ft) (econ cruise)
- Range: 900 km (560 mi, 490 nmi) at 1,000 m with torpedo, 1,602 km (865 nmi, 995 mi) reconnaissance mission

Armament

- Guns: 1× fixed forward firing 7.5mm Darne machine gun and flexibly mounted Darne guns in dorsal and ventral positions
- Bombs: 1× 650 kg (1,430 lb) torpedo or 4 × 150 kg (330 lb) bombs or 2× 225 kg (500 lb) bombs or 1× 450 kg (990 lb) bomb

== See also ==
Aircraft of comparable role, configuration, and era

- Dewoitine D.750
- Latécoère 299
- Nakajima B5N
- TBD Devastator
- Fairey Albacore
