= Dewoitine D.750 =

D.750

General information
- Type: Torpedo bomber
- National origin: France
- Manufacturer: SNCAM
- Status: Prototype
- Number built: 1

History
- First flight: 6 May 1940

The Dewoitine D.750 was a prototype French twin-engined torpedo bomber. It was designed prior to the outbreak of the Second World War to operate from the aircraft carriers of the French Navy, but only a single example was completed, with development ended by France's defeat by Germany in June 1940.

== Design and development ==
In 1937, the French Air Ministry drew up a specification for a twin-engined torpedo bomber to operate from the French Navy's two planned new aircraft carriers, the Joffre and Painlevé. The Société nationale des constructions aéronautiques du Midi (SNCAM) submitted a design (which was developed by the design team formerly of Dewoitine), that became part of SNCAM when it was established in 1937.

SNCAM's design, the Dewoitine D.750 was a low-winged monoplane of all-metal stressed skin construction, powered by two Renault 12R air-cooled V12 engines. It was fitted with a retractable tailwheel undercarriage and a twin tail. The fuselage, of similar layout to the competing SNCAO CAO.600 housed the crew of two or three required by the specification in separate cockpits. The bombardier/navigator sat in the nose, with the pilot sitting behind him, above and to the left of the navigator. The radio operator/gunner sat aft of the wing, operating Darne machine guns in dorsal and ventral positions.

== Operational history ==
Two prototypes of the D.750 were ordered by the French Air Ministry on 26 June 1939, the first example making its maiden flight on 6 May 1940 with SNCAM's chief test pilot Marcel Doret at the controls. A few days later, however, Nazi Germany invaded France and the Low countries, and the first prototype had not completed manufacturers tests before France surrendered on 25 June. This caused development of the D.750 to be abandoned, with the second prototype incomplete.

== Specifications (D.750) ==
Data from War Planes of the Second World War: Volume Eight Bombers and Reconnaissance Aircraft

General characteristics

- Crew: 2 or 3
- Length: 10.39 m (34 ft 1 in)
- Wingspan: 15.90 m (52 ft 2 in)
- Height: 2.89 m (9 ft 6 in)
- Empty weight: 2,917 kg (6,431 lb)
- Gross weight: 4,272 kg (9,418 lb) (reconnaissance mission)
- Max takeoff weight: 4,492 kg (9,903 lb) (torpedo-bomber role)
- Powerplant: 2 × Renault 12R air-cooled inverted V12 engine, 370 kW (500 hp) each (take off power)
- Propellers: 3-bladed Ratier 1716 variable-pitch propeller, 4.43 m (14 ft 6 in) diameter

Performance

- Maximum speed: 357 km/h (222 mph, 193 kn) at 1,500 m (4,920 ft)
- Cruise speed: 240 km/h (149 mph, 129 kn) econ cruise at 1,000 m (3,300 ft)
- Range: 1,400 km (900 mi, 780 nmi)
- Endurance: 6 hr

Armament

- Guns: 3 × 7.5 mm Darne machine guns, one fixed forward firing, one in dorsal position and one in ventral position
- Bombs: 1 × 650 kg (1,430 lb) torpedo or 4 × 150 kg (330 lb) bombs or 2× 225 kg (500 lb) bombs or 1× 450 kg (990 lb) bomb

== See also ==
Aircraft of comparable role, configuration, and era

- SNCAO CAO.600
- Latécoère 298
- Nakajima B5N
- TBD Devastator
- Fairey Albacore
