= SNCAC NC.420 =

1940s French aircraft

NC.420

General information
- Type: Observation flying boat
- National origin: France
- Manufacturer: SNCAC
- Number built: 1

The SNCAC NC-420 was a French observation flying boat built by SNCAC in the 1940s. It was intended to operate from the ships of the French Navy, but although a single prototype was completed, it never flew.

== Development and design ==
The aircraft was developed under a program initiated by the French Navy in March 1937 for a "heavy seaplane" to replace the aging Loire 130 floatplane, which operated from the seaplane carrier Commandant Teste as well as the French Navy's battleships and cruisers. Had it entered service, the fast battleship Gascogne was to have carried three of the new aircraft. The program requested an aircraft that had an endurance of six hours and be suitable for dive bombing or laying smoke screens. The aircraft could be single- or twin-engined and be a flying boat or floatplane. The endurance requirement was later reduced to five hours to save weight, and the smoke screen requirement removed.

Designs to meet the requirement were received from SNCAC (the NC.420), Bréguet (the Bréguet 792) and Gourdou (the G-130 HY). All three types were twin-engined, with Gourdou proposing a floatplane and both SNCAC and Bréguet proposing flying boats. While Bréguet's design was a twin-engined derivative of its Bréguet 790 single-engined coastal patrol aircraft, SNCAC's design was all-new. Orders were placed with SNCAC and Bréguet for two prototypes each of their designs in January 1939.

The NC.420 was a twin-engine aircraft, an uncommon arrangement for ship-borne reconnaissance aircraft where a premium was placed on compactness. It could nevertheless be reduced to a width of 4.75 m (15.6 ft) with the wings folded, which made it comparable in size (and weight) to the Loire 130 it was slated to have replaced. The aircraft had an all-metal hull, while the pilot sat in an enclosed cockpit to the left of the aircraft's centreline to aid handling when on the water. It was powered by two Béarn 6D 6-cylinder air-cooled inline engines rated at 325 horsepower (242 kW) normal and 390 hp (290 kW) for take-off, driving three-bladed variable-pitch propellers.

Work on the prototype was nearing completion in June 1940, but the German victory in the Battle of France caused many French military programs to be suspended, including that for the NC.420. In June 1942 the German Armistice Commission gave permission for the construction of up to fifteen NC.420s to replace Loire 130s that were damaged or destroyed through normal operation, to be built in 1943–1944. Work was slowed, however, by the use of SNCAC's Fourchambault factory to build wings for Siebel Si 204s required by the Luftwaffe. The prototype was moved to Antibes in Southern France for testing in November 1942, but its engines did not arrive until April 1943. The prototype was completed in mid-June 1943, but the escape of the prototype SNCASO SO.90 to Algeria on 16 August 1943 resulted in Italian occupation forces disabling the NC.420's controls so it could not be flown to join Free French Forces in North Africa. The NC.420 survived the war, but was scrapped sometime before the liquidation of SNCAC in 1949.

== Specifications (NC.420) ==
Data from

General characteristics

- Crew: 3
- Length: 11.20 m (36 ft 9 in)
- Wingspan: 15.90 m (52 ft 2 in)
- Width: 4.75 m (15 ft 7 in) (folded)
- Height: 3.81 m (12 ft 6 in)
- Wing area: 34 m^{2} (370 sq ft)
- Empty weight: 2,895 kg (6,382 lb)
- Gross weight: 3,786 kg (8,347 lb) (with fuel for 5 hr flight)
- Fuel capacity: 340 L (75 imp gal; 90 US gal)
- Powerplant: 2 × Béarn 6D.07 6-cylinder inverted air-cooled in-line piston engines, 290 kW (390 hp) each (takeoff power)
- Propellers: 3-bladed Ratier variable-pitch propeller

Performance

- Maximum speed: 300 km/h (190 mph, 160 kn) at 1,800 m (5,900 ft)
- Range: 1,350 km (840 mi, 730 nmi) at 240 km/h (150 mph; 130 kn)
- Service ceiling: 7,120 m (23,360 ft)

Armament

- Guns: 2× machine guns (1× forward-firing and 1× in dorsal mount)
- Bombs: 2× 75 kg (165 lb)
