= Joffre-class aircraft carrier =

Planned class of French aircraft carriers

- Joffre-class fleet carrier

Class overview
- Name: Joffre class
- Builders: Ateliers et Chantiers de Saint-Nazaire Penhoët, Saint-Nazaire
- Operators: French Navy
- Preceded by: Béarn
- Succeeded by: Clemenceau class
- Built: 1938–1940
- Planned: 2
- Canceled: 2

General characteristics
- Type: Aircraft carrier
- Displacement: 18,000 t (17,716 long tons) (standard); 20,000 t (19,684 long tons) (deep load)
- Length: 236 m (774 ft 3 in)
- Beam: 24.6 m (80 ft 9 in) (waterline)
- Draft: 6.6 m (21 ft 8 in)
- Installed power: 8 water-tube boilers; 120,000 shp (89,000 kW)
- Propulsion: 2 shafts; 2 geared steam turbines
- Speed: 33.5 knots (62.0 km/h; 38.6 mph)
- Range: 7,000 nmi (13,000 km; 8,100 mi) at 20 knots (37 km/h; 23 mph)
- Complement: 1,250
- Armament: 4 × twin 130 mm (5.1 in) DP guns; 4 × twin 37 mm (1.5 in) AA guns; 7 × quadruple 13.2 mm (0.5 in) AA machine guns
- Armor: Waterline belt: 105 mm (4.1 in); Deck: 30–70 mm (1.2–2.8 in); Gun turrets: 20 mm (0.8 in); Barbettes: 20 mm (0.8 in)
- Aircraft carried: 40

The Joffre class consisted of a pair of aircraft carriers ordered by the Marine Nationale (French Navy) prior to World War II. The Navy had commissioned an experimental carrier in 1927, but it was slow and obsolete by the mid-1930s. Support for naval aviation in the navy was weak during this time as it had lost control of its aircraft, its training and their development to the new Air Ministry when it formed in 1928 and did not regain full control until 1936. Traditionalists among the naval leadership had begun a battleship building program in the early 1930s to counter German ships that were suitable for commerce raiding and carriers were deemed useful to hunt them down, especially once the Germans began building a carrier of their own in 1936.

One ship was laid down in 1938, but was not launched before all work was cancelled after the Armistice of 22 June 1940. The incomplete hull of Joffre was subsequently scrapped.

== Background ==
The Marine Nationale ordered the conversion of the incomplete Normandie-class battleship Béarn into an aircraft carrier in 1922 to gain experience with carrier aviation. The following year the Naval General Staff requested another carrier similar to Béarn, but this was rejected as too expensive and plans were made for a cheaper aircraft transport that eventually became the seaplane carrier Commandant Teste.

The 1928 formation of the Ministère de l'Air (Air Ministry) cost the Marine Nationale control of naval aviation as the new ministry centralized all aspects of military aviation, including aircraft development, training, bases and coastal aircraft. With the Navy only controlling the aircraft aboard its ships, the development of naval aviation stagnated as it was generally ignored by the ministry and no new carrier aircraft were developed in 1928–1932. The Marine Nationale was able to gradually reduce the ministry's control between 1931 and 1934 until it regained full control in August 1936. By this time the Marine Nationale had embarked on a building program for 29–32-knot (54–59 km/h; 33–37 mph) fast battleships to counter possible German commerce raiders in the North Atlantic that the 21-knot (39 km/h; 24 mph) Béarn was simply too slow to support. The Navy believed that carrier operations within range of hostile land-based aircraft were not viable given the limited size of their air groups and the commerce protection mission was ideal for its carriers. Design studies for a carrier able to operate with the new ships began in 1934, but two ships were not authorized until 1937, possibly in response to the laying down of the carrier Graf Zeppelin by Nazi Germany in 1936.

== Description ==
The Joffre-class carriers were 228 meters (748 ft) long between perpendiculars and 236 meters (774 ft 3 in) long overall. They had a beam of 24.6 meters (80 ft 9 in) at the waterline and 34.5 meters (113 ft 2 in) at the flight deck. The ships displaced 18,000 metric tons (17,716 long tons) at standard load and 20,000 t (19,684 long tons) at full load, which gave them a draft of 6.6 meters (21 ft 8 in). Their crew numbered 70 officers and 1,180 sailors.

The Marine Nationale based the propulsion machinery of the Joffres on that used in the light cruiser De Grasse, albeit with eight Indret water-tube boilers rather than four. The ships were fitted with two Parsons geared steam turbines, each driving one propeller shaft using steam provided by the boilers at a working pressure of 35 kg/cm^{2} (3,432 kPa; 498 psi) and a temperature of 385 °C (725 °F). The turbines were rated at a total of 120,000 shaft horsepower (89,484 kW; 121,664 PS) and were designed to give a speed of 33.5 knots (62.0 km/h; 38.6 mph). The carriers retained the unit system of machinery with each boiler room supplying steam to the engine room aft of it so that one hit could not completely immobilize the ships. The boiler uptakes were trunked into a single funnel integrated into the island on the starboard side of the flight deck. The ships were designed to carry enough fuel oil to give them a range of 7,000 nautical miles (13,000 km; 8,100 mi) at 20 knots (37 km/h; 23 mph).

=== Aviation facilities ===
The ships' 201-meter-long (659 ft 5 in) flight deck was offset to the left from the centerline. This helped to compensate for the weight of the very large island and allowed it to have a continuous width of 27 meters (88 ft 7 in). The deck itself was 16 millimeters (0.63 in) in thickness. The carriers were intended to be fitted with an aircraft-handling crane near the stern, below the flight deck that were strong enough to lift a seaplane aboard. They had a fuel capacity of approximately 270,000 litres (59,000 imp gal; 71,000 US gal) of aviation gasoline.

The Marine Nationale optimized the design of the Joffre class for "double-ended" operations, where aircraft could land and take off over both the bow and stern, so that battle damage to the flight deck would not necessarily end flight operations. Like Béarn, the Joffre's had their arresting gear amidships, abreast the island, although the number of wires was increased to nine. While the amidships position minimized the ships' pitching in high seas, the air turbulence generated by the island was at its worst amidships. Based on trials aboard Béarn in 1935, collapsible landing signals were positioned on the centerline of the flight deck amid the arresting wires, facing in both directions. The flight deck was not provided with any crash barriers, so the American practice of keeping aircraft on the deck during landing operations was not possible.

The two hydraulically powered elevators that transferred aircraft between the flight deck and the upper hangar were positioned at the ends of the flight deck, allowing aircraft landing amidships to taxi forward to the elevators and rapidly clear the flight deck. Both elevators were configured to be used by aircraft with their wings still spread, eliminating the requirement to fold the wings before using the elevators that slowed down Béarn's flight operations. The forward elevator was roughly T-shaped and measured 13 m (42 ft 8 in) long and 17 m (55 ft 9 in) wide; the large elevator well so close to the bow weakened the ships' structure so the designers minimized the size of the well in the hangar deck by only seating the central 6 m (19 ft 8 in) section in the deck while the outer areas of the elevator rested on top of the deck, requiring a small ramp to move on or off the elevator. The rear elevator was outside the hangar and only its forward end reached the flight deck. Although it only measured 12.5 by 6 m (41 ft 0 in by 19 ft 8 in), its position allowed it to strike down aircraft regardless of size.

The carriers were designed with two hangar decks, the upper of which measured 158.5 by 20.8 m (520 ft 0 in by 68 ft 3 in) with a height of 4.8 m (15 ft 9 in). A space 20 m (65 ft 7 in) long below the flight deck and between the upper hangar and the rear elevator allowed aircraft to warm up their engines before moving to the flight deck. A single fire curtain amidships could be used to divide the hangar. It was the only one that could be used for aircraft operations as the lower hangars were dedicated to workshops and aircraft assembly and storage facilities. The rear lower hangar was 79 by 14.9 m (259 ft 2 in by 48 ft 11 in) in size and had a height of 4.4 m (14 ft 5 in). A 13 by 7 m (42 ft 8 in by 23 ft 0 in) elevator at the forward end of this hangar allowed aircraft to be transferred between the hangars. This elevator was offset to starboard to allow for a passageway to the lower hangar annex that measured 42 by 6.6 m (137 ft 10 in by 21 ft 8 in). This annex, presumably dedicated to spare parts, was offset to port to make room for the boiler uptakes and ventilation ducting of the forward engine and fire rooms.

Based on their decade of experience with Béarn and frequent exercises with the British Fleet Air Arm during the 1930s, the Aéronavale (French Naval Aviation) believed that air operations would be continuous, with small numbers of aircraft taking off or landing. This required multi-role aircraft, able to switch between missions as the tactical situation dictated. The Joffre-class carriers were designed with an air group of 40 aircraft, 15 single-engined fighters and 25 twin-engined aircraft capable of long-range reconnaissance, bombing and torpedo attacks. In 1939 the Navy ordered 120 Dewoitine D.790 fighters, a navalized variant of the Dewoitine D.520, although no aircraft was completed before the Armistice cancelled further work. It issued the A47 specification in 1937 for attack aircraft to equip the carriers and ordered two prototypes each of the SNCAO CAO.600 and the Dewoitine D.750 in 1939. The Aéronavale issued the updated A80 specification that same year for a faster aircraft and selected the Bréguet Bre.810, a navalized version of the Bréguet Bre.693, but the prototype was not completed before the Armistice.

=== Armament, fire control and armor ===
The carriers' primary armament consisted of eight 45-caliber Canon de 130 mm (5.1 in) Mle 1932 dual-purpose guns in four twin-gun turrets positioned fore and aft of the island in superfiring pairs. The guns fired a 32.11-kilogram (70.8 lb) armor-piercing shell at a muzzle velocity of 800 m/s (2,600 ft/s). This gave them a range of 20,870 meters (22,820 yd) at an elevation of +45°. Their mounts had a maximum elevation of +75° and the guns had a rate of fire of about 10 rounds per minute.

Light anti-aircraft defense was provided by eight 48-caliber Canon de 37 mm (1.5 in) Mle 1935 guns in four twin-gun ACAD mounts on the island, and twenty-eight Hotchkiss Mitrailleuse de 13.2 mm (0.52 in) Mle 1929 machine guns in seven quadruple mounts. There were two mounts on the forecastle, two on the stern and a pair on the island. The remaining mount was on the port side underneath the flight deck overhang. The 37 mm guns were fully automatic and had a theoretical rate of fire of 165 rounds per minute. They had a range of 8,000 meters (8,700 yd) with their 0.831-kilogram (1.83 lb) shells which were fired at a muzzle velocity of 825 m/s (2,710 ft/s). Their mounts had an elevation range of -10° to +85°. The 13.2 mm machine guns had an effective range of 2,500 m (8,200 ft).

The 130 mm guns were controlled by a pair of superimposed directors on the top of a short tower on the roof of the island. The upper director was equipped with a 5-meter (16 ft 5 in) rangefinder for anti-aircraft defense and the lower with a 6-meter (19 ft 8 in) one for surface engagements. Each of the upper 130 mm turrets was fitted with a rotating 5-meter rangefinder as a backup to the directors. A director equipped with a 2-meter (6 ft 7 in) rangefinder remotely controlled each ACAD mount. The two forward directors were superimposed on the roof of the island while the two after directors were side-by-side aft of the director tower.

The waterline armor belt of the Joffre-class ships covered the middle 120 meters (393 ft 8 in) of the hull, from the forward magazines to the aft aviation gasoline tank. It was 105 millimeters (4.1 in) thick and had a height of about 3.7 meters (12 ft 2 in) from the main deck to 1.45 meters (4 ft 9 in) below the waterline. It formed an armored citadel with 70-millimeter (2.8 in) transverse bulkheads at its ends. The armored deck was 70 mm thick over the magazines and gasoline tanks, but reduced to 30 millimeters (1.2 in) amidships over the machinery compartments. The 6.6-meter-deep (21 ft 8 in) torpedo belt ranged in thickness from 35 to 55 millimeters (1.4 to 2.2 in) abreast the propulsion machinery spaces, but thinned to 26 millimeters (1 in) abreast the magazines. The steering compartment was fitted with 26-millimeter armor plates. The 130 mm directors, turrets, their hoists, and their upper handling rooms were protected by 20 millimeters (0.8 in) of armor, as were the command spaces in the island. For protection against fire, the aviation gasoline tanks were surrounded by either empty compartments with fire-resistant insulation or inert gases on all sides.

== Ships ==
The beginning of World War II less than a year after Joffre was laid down led to a slow down of construction as resources were diverted to higher-priority tasks and the ultimate cessation of work that came in June 1940 when the country capitulated after the German invasion when the ship was approximately 20% complete. Work on Joffre was not continued by the Germans and the hull was scrapped. The second planned vessel of the class, Painlevé, was never laid down because it was supposed to succeed Joffre on Slipway No. 1. A third ship was intended to be authorized in 1940 to replace Béarn, but the order was never placed.

The Marine Nationale demonstrated no sense of urgency in building Joffre as the bulk of the naval leadership felt completing the two Richelieu-class battleships to match the modern German and Italian battleships was more important. This was further demonstrated when the first ship of the Alsace-class battleships was authorized on 1 April 1940 and replaced Painlevé in the queue for Slipway No. 1. This belief was not unreasonable as the Germans had suspended work on Graf Zeppelin and the British had an ample number of carriers that could perform the trade protection mission in the North Atlantic.

Construction data
Name	Namesake	Builder	Laid down	Launched	Fate
Joffre	Marshal Joseph Joffre	Ateliers et Chantiers de Saint-Nazaire Penhoët, Saint-Nazaire	26 November 1938	N/A	Construction abandoned, June 1940, subsequently scrapped
Painlevé	Paul Painlevé	Ateliers et Chantiers de Saint-Nazaire Penhoët, Saint-Nazaire	N/A	N/A	N/A

== Bibliography ==
- Campbell, John (1985). Naval Weapons of World War Two. Annapolis, Maryland: Naval Institute Press. ISBN 0-87021-459-4.
- Chesneau, Roger (1984). Aircraft Carriers of the World, 1914 to the Present: An Illustrated Encyclopedia. Annapolis, Maryland: Naval Institute Press. ISBN 0-87021-902-2.
- Jordan, John (2003). "The Aircraft Transport Commandante Teste". In Preston, Antony (ed.). Warship 2002–2003. London: Conway Maritime Press. pp. 26–36. ISBN 0-85177-926-3.
- Jordan, John (2010). "PA16 Joffre: France's Carrier Project of 1938". In Jordan, John (ed.). Warship 2010. London: Conway. pp. 60–76. ISBN 978-1-84486-110-1.
- Jordan, John & Dumas, Robert (2009). French Battleships 1922–1956. Barnsley, UK: Seaforth Publishing. ISBN 978-1-84832-034-5.
- Jordan, John & Moulin, Jean (2013). French Cruisers 1922–1956. Barnsley, UK: Seaforth Publishing. ISBN 978-1-84832-133-5.
- Roberts, John (1980). "France". In Chesneau, Roger (ed.). Conway's All the World's Fighting Ships 1922–1946. New York: Mayflower Books. pp. 255–279. ISBN 0-8317-0303-2.
- Silverstone, Paul H. (1984). Directory of the World's Capital Ships. New York: Hippocrene Books. ISBN 0-88254-979-0.
