= Richelieu-class battleship =

French class of fast battleships

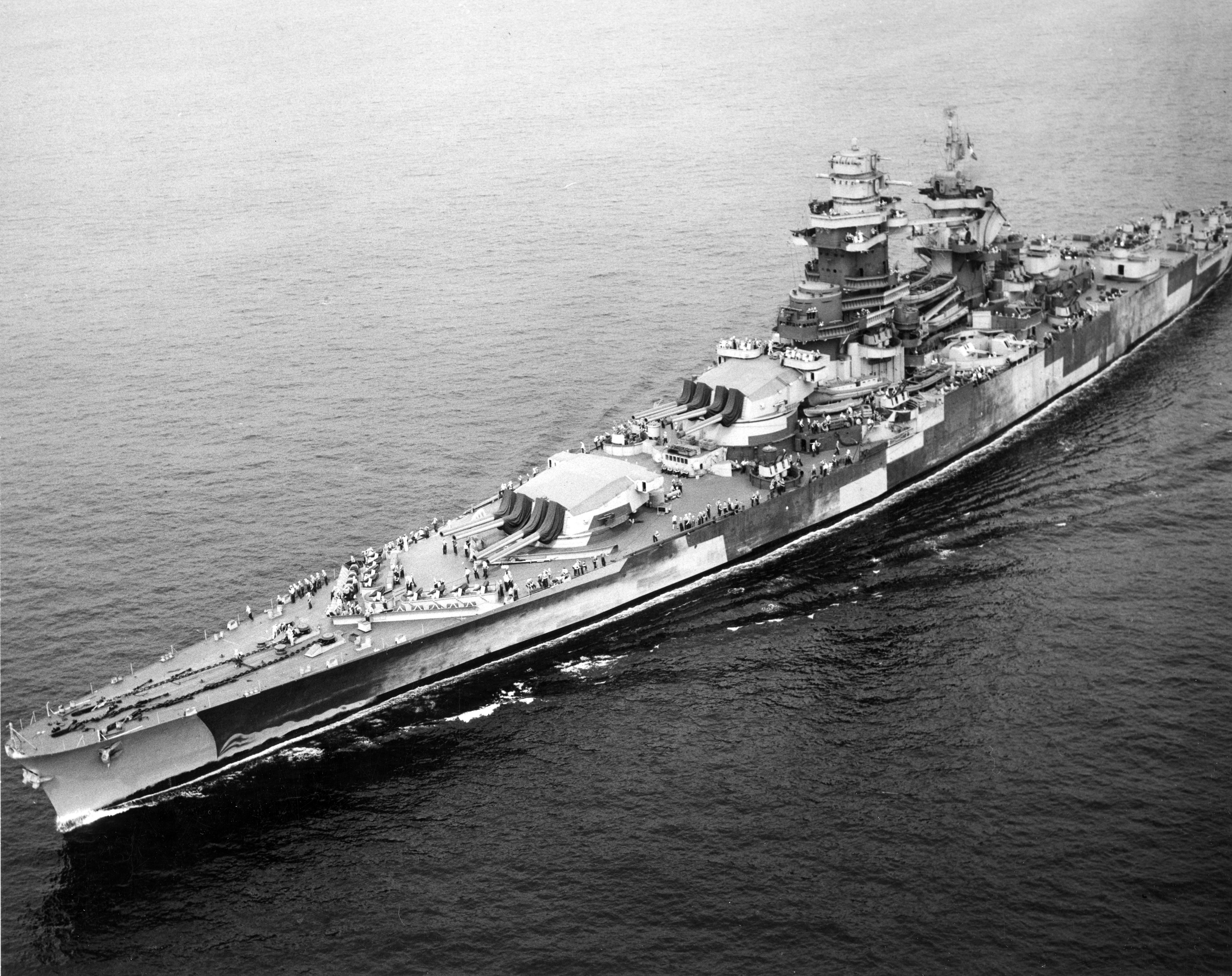
- Richelieu after her refit in the United States, c. September 1943

Class overview
- Name: Richelieu class
- Builders: Arsenal de Brest; Ateliers et Chantiers de Saint-Nazaire Penhoët
- Operators: French Navy; (Free France) Free French Navy
- Preceded by: Dunkerque class
- Succeeded by: Alsace class (planned)
- Subclasses: Gascogne
- Built: 1935–1955
- In service: 1940–1970
- Planned: 4
- Completed: 2
- Cancelled: 2
- Scrapped: 2

General characteristics (Designed configuration)
- Type: Fast battleship
- Displacement: Standard: 37,250 long tons (37,850 t); Full load: 43,992 long tons (44,698 t)
- Length: 247.85 m (813 ft 2 in) o/a
- Beam: 33.08 m (108 ft 6 in)
- Draft: Full load: 9.9 m (32 ft 6 in)
- Installed power: 6 × forced-circulation boilers; 155,000 shp (116,000 kW)
- Propulsion: 4 × Parsons geared turbines; 4 × screws
- Speed: 32 knots (59 km/h; 37 mph)
- Range: 9,500 nautical miles (17,600 km; 10,900 mi) at 15 knots (28 km/h; 17 mph)
- Complement: 1,569
- Armament: 8 × 380 mm (15 in) guns; 9 × 152 mm (6 in) guns; 12 × 100 mm (3.9 in) AA guns; 8 × 37 mm (1.5 in) AA guns; 24 × 13.2 mm (0.52 in) machine guns
- Armor: Belt: 327 mm (12.9 in); Main deck: 170 mm (6.7 in); Turrets: 430 mm (17 in); Conning tower: 340 mm (13 in)
- Aircraft carried: 4 × Loire 130 seaplanes
- Aviation facilities: 2 × catapults

General characteristics (Richelieu 1943 refit)
- Displacement: Standard: 43,957 t (43,263 long tons); Full load: 47,728 t (46,974 long tons)
- Draft: Full load: 10.68 m (35 ft)
- Complement: 1,930
- Sensors & processing systems: SF surface search radar; SA-2 air search radar
- Armament: 8 × 380 mm guns; 9 × 152 mm guns; 12 × 100 mm AA guns; 56 × 40 mm (1.6 in) Bofors AA guns; 48 × 20 mm (0.79 in) Oerlikon AA autocannons

General characteristics (Jean Bart as completed)
- Displacement: Normal: 43,052 t (42,372 long tons); Full load: 49,196 t (48,419 long tons)
- Draft: 10.9 m (36 ft)
- Complement: 2,220
- Sensors & processing systems: 1 × DRBV 11 air/surface search radar; 1 × DRBV 20 air search radar; 1 × DRBV 30 navigation radar; 1 × DRBC 10A fire control (FC) radar; 6 × ACAE FC radar; 5 × DRBC 30B FC radar
- Armament: 8 × 380 mm guns; 9 × 152 mm guns; 12 × 100 mm AA guns; 28 × 57 mm (2.2 in) AA guns

The Richelieu class were fast battleships built for the French Navy between the 1930s and 1950s. Initially two ships were ordered in 1935 in response to Italian orders for the Littorio-class battleships the previous year. The Richelieus were based on the preceding Dunkerque class, but scaled up to accommodate more powerful 380 mm (15 in) guns and armor to protect them from guns of the same caliber. To keep the ships within the displacement limits imposed by the Washington Naval Treaty, they featured the same concentrated arrangement as the Dunkerques for the main battery: two quadruple gun turrets placed forward. They also incorporated new, more compact boilers that allowed for a shorter hull (which required less heavy armor) for the desired top speed. After Germany ordered two Bismarck-class battleships, France responded with another pair of Richelieus, to be built to modified designs. The first, Clemenceau, would have received modified secondary and anti-aircraft batteries, while Gascogne would have had her superfiring main battery turret shifted aft, along with other changes. Clemenceau was never completed, and Gascogne was never laid down. The Richelieus were the last battleships built for the French Navy.

Neither of the two completed members of the class had been completed by the outbreak of World War II. Richelieu was finished shortly before the French defeat in the Battle of France, while Jean Bart was hurriedly prepared to be ready to go to sea during the campaign. Both vessels fled to French colonies in Africa: Richelieu steamed to Dakar and Jean Bart went to Casablanca. Work on Clemenceau and Gascogne stopped after the Germans occupied France. In mid-1940, Richelieu was attacked twice and damaged by British forces attempting to coerce the crew to defect to Free France, while Jean Bart was badly damaged by American forces during Operation Torch in November 1942. After the French African colonies shifted to Free French control, Richelieu was taken to the United States to be repaired and modernized, while Jean Bart was not completed. Richelieu saw active service with the British Home Fleet in early 1944 before being transferred to the Eastern Fleet later that year. There, she took part in numerous operations against Japanese forces in the Indian Ocean. She was present for the Japanese surrender of Singapore at the end of the war.

After the war, Richelieu took part in the initial campaign to restore control of French Indochina before returning to France, where she saw limited activity into the early 1950s. During this period, the French Navy discussed proposals to complete Jean Bart or convert her into an aircraft carrier, ultimately settling on the former. Jean Bart was finally commissioned in 1955, thereafter taking part in the French intervention in the Suez Crisis in November 1956. Her career proved to be a short one, and she was placed in reserve in 1957. Both vessels were used as training and barracks ships into the 1960s; Richelieu was sold to ship breakers in 1968 and Jean Bart followed her in 1970.

== Design ==
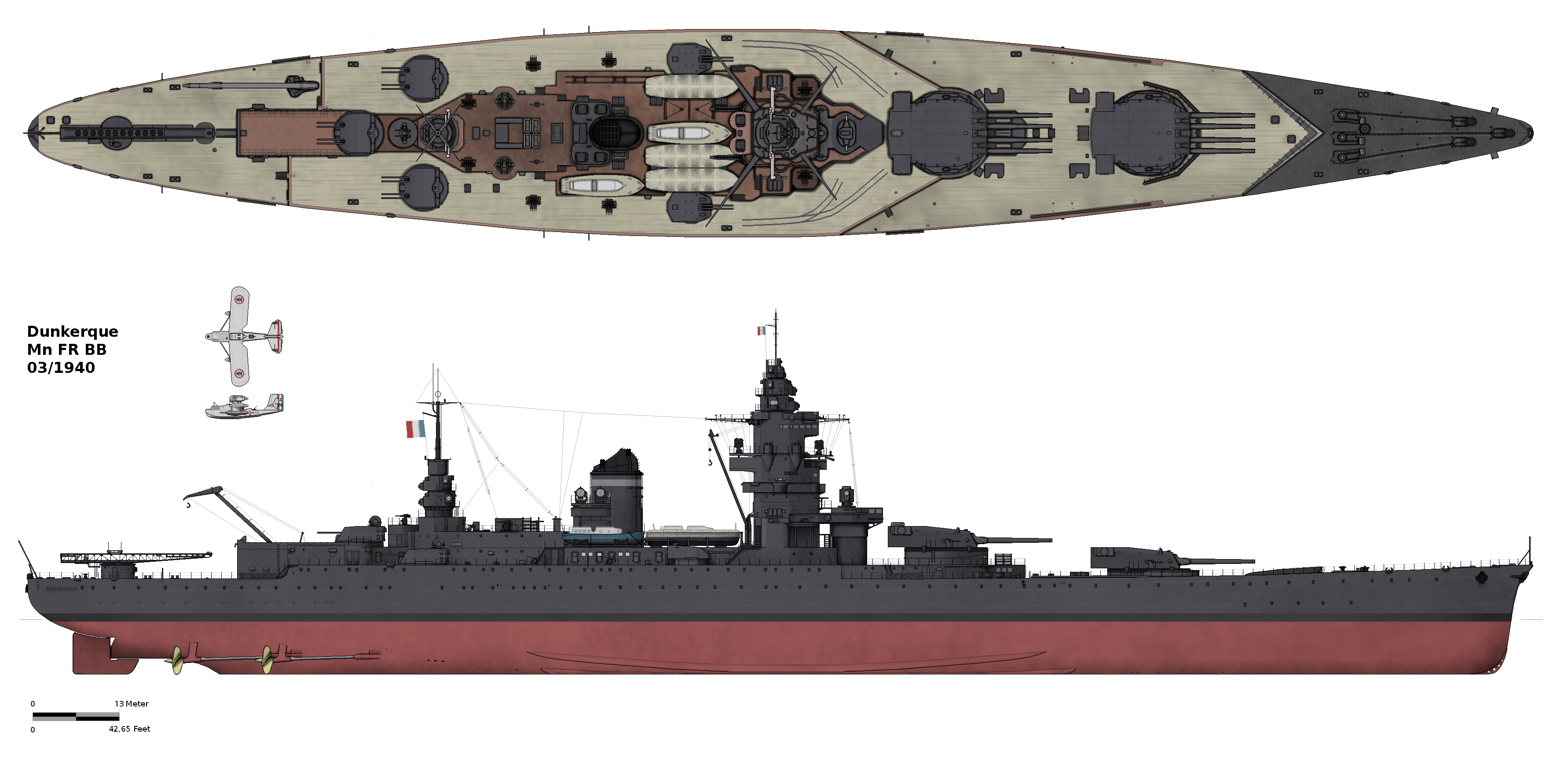
The earlier battleship Dunkerque, which provided the basis for the Richelieu design

In the early 1930s, the French Navy began construction of the two small Dunkerque-class battleships in response to the German Deutschland-class cruisers. The Italian Regia Marina (Royal Navy)—France's other major naval rival—announced on 11 June 1935 that it would begin building two 35,000-long-ton (36,000 t) battleships of the Littorio class in response to the Dunkerques. The Italian ships were to be armed with nine 381 mm (15 in) guns, significantly more powerful than the eight 330 mm (13 in) guns of the French ships. In order to maintain parity, the French realized that similar vessels would be required to counter the new Italian ships. At the time, battleship construction was governed by the Washington Naval Treaty, which limited displacement to 35,000 tons and gun armament to 406 mm (16 in).

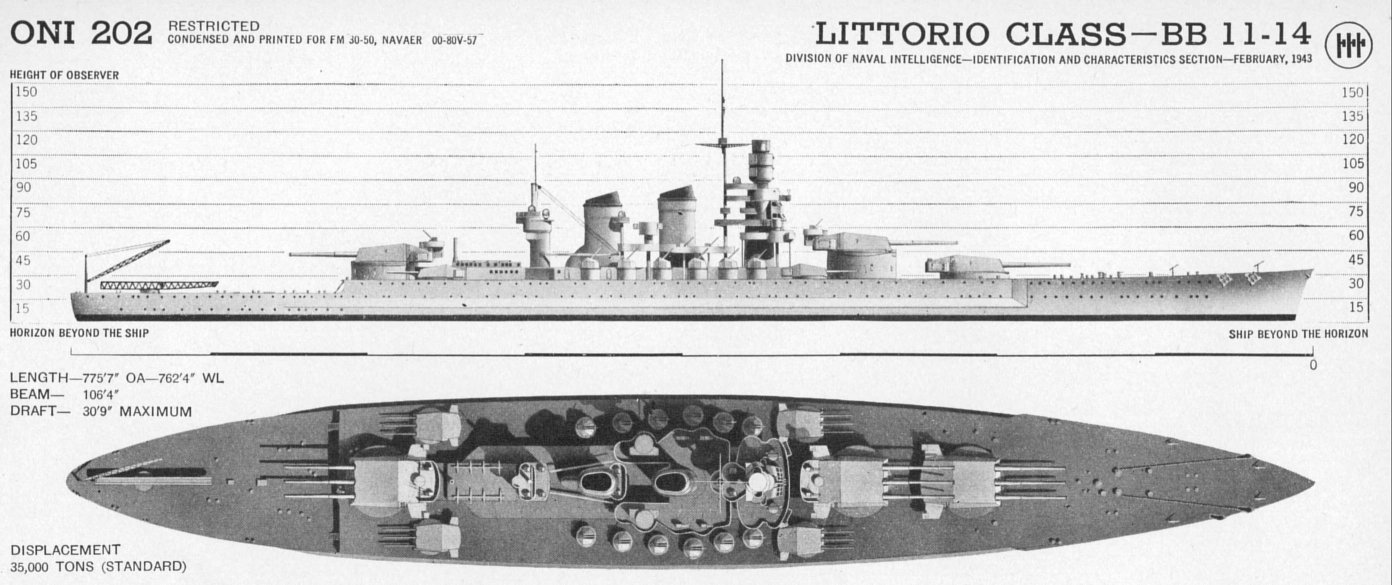
Recognition drawing of Littorio, construction of which prompted the French response with Richelieu

The French naval command issued specifications for a new battleship design in response to the Littorios on 24 July, less than two weeks after the Italian ships were announced. The new ships would be built to the maximum Washington limits: 35,000 tons displacement and a battery of eight guns of either 380 mm or 406 mm. The vessels would also carry a secondary battery of dual-purpose guns, be capable of a speed of 29.5 to 30 knots (54.6 to 55.6 km/h; 33.9 to 34.5 mph), and carry belt armor that was 360 mm (14 in) thick. Vice-Amiral (Vice Admiral) Georges Durand-Viel, the Chief of Staff of the French Navy, favored using the basic Dunkerque design, scaled up to account for the increases in displacement, armament, and armor, to reduce the amount of time needed to design the ship. The Dunkerques had adopted an unusual arrangement of the main battery that grouped all eight guns in a pair of four-gun turrets placed forward of the superstructure in a superfiring pair.

Initial studies by the design staff quickly demonstrated that a battery of 406 mm guns would be impossible if the other characteristics would be fulfilled within the allotted displacement. Six proposals were submitted on 27 November. The first, Project 1, was a scaled up Dunkerque, while Project 2, 3, and 4 were variations on that design with main battery arrangements based on the British Nelson class, mounting three turrets forward of the superstructure. Project 2 used one twin and two triple turrets, Project 3 incorporated one quadruple and two twin turrets, while Project 4 used three triple turrets. Two related variants, Project 5 and 5 bis adopted an even more unusual arrangement featuring two quadruple turrets placed amidships between fore and aft superstructures inspired by the ideas of the Italian admiral Vincenzo De Feo. Secondary armament for the designs amounted to twelve 130 mm (5.1 in) guns in quadruple turrets as on the Dunkerques. All six designs were overweight and the last two were quickly rejected since their layout significantly limited the firing arc of the main battery.

Top to bottom: Project 1–5bis

The naval command quickly settled on Project 1, as it had the most balanced combination of speed and combat power—offensively and defensively—that could realistically be achieved within the displacement constraints imposed by the Washington Treaty (and the existing French shipyard facilities). But concerns over the perceived lightness of the secondary battery compared to foreign capital ships led the command to request studies for a new 152 mm (6 in) secondary battery, despite this precluding the use of dual-purpose guns. The designers submitted two options: five triple or four triple turrets, with a heavy anti-aircraft battery of 75 mm (3 in) guns; the five turret variant would include six of the 75 mm guns, while the four turret version would add two of the 75 mm weapons. These proposals presented several problems: first, the anti-aircraft guns were sensitive to blast effects from the main and secondary batteries, which would require additional space that was not available, and second, the Project 1 design was already overweight, and the added guns would increase displacement even further. The naval command ultimately decided on 14 April 1935 that new dual-purpose mounts for the 152 mm guns would have to be developed.

The weight problem was solved by adopting a new type of boiler, designated "Sural" (short for suralimenté [pressure-fired]); these boilers were much more compact than the type used in the Dunkerque class and the Richelieus had a wider beam (allowing three boilers side-by-side instead of just two), so the boiler rooms could be reduced from three to two, with the total machinery space shortened considerably. Since the machinery spaces required heavy armor protection, this reduced the length of the hull that needed to be covered by the armor belt by almost 5 m (16 ft 5 in). The belt was also decreased in thickness from 360 mm to 330 mm (though the angle of inclination was increased to compensate for the reduction); coupled with minor reductions in armor elsewhere in the ship, these changes offset the weight of the 152 mm battery and brought the displacement within Washington limits. Work on the design proceeded quickly, and on 14 August, the navy placed orders for the first two ships, Richelieu and Jean Bart.

Despite both vessels adhering to the displacement limits, when construction of Richelieu began in October, France had violated the Washington Treaty. The treaty had included a moratorium on new battleship construction that was extended by the London Naval Treaty of 1930 (which France had signed but not ratified), though France and Italy had secured an exception to allow them to build up to 70,000 long tons (71,000 t) of new battleships as their fleets were older than those of the other signatories. Combined with the two Dunkerques, Richelieu brought the total French construction program to 88,000 long tons (89,000 t), and when Jean Bart was laid down in December 1936, the total rose to 123,000 long tons (125,000 t). Britain objected to the construction program, but France dismissed them by pointing out that Britain had unilaterally signed the Anglo-German Naval Agreement earlier in 1935, effectively abrogating the disarmament clauses of the Treaty of Versailles that had severely constrained the size and effectiveness of the German fleet. From the French perspective, if Britain would cavalierly strengthen France's enemy, the French would similarly disregard their own treaty obligations in favor of self defense.

=== General characteristics ===
Side plan of the ship

By the time the first vessel was completed, the Richelieu-class ships displaced 37,250 long tons (37,850 t) standard and 43,992 long tons (44,698 t) fully loaded. They were 242 m (794 ft) long between perpendiculars and were 247.85 m (813 ft 2 in) long overall. They had a beam of 33.08 m (108 ft 6 in) and a maximum draft of 9.9 m (32 ft 6 in). Because the compact Sural boilers allowed the machinery spaces to be shortened, the ships featured a very compact superstructure. This in turn allowed for a long forecastle that significantly improved seakeeping and helped to keep the bow dry in heavier seas. The ships' superstructure was fairly minimal; it featured a single tower mast directly behind the armored conning tower, along with a small deck house directly aft of the funnel.

Their crew numbered 1,569 officers and men, though this changed considerably over the course of their careers, particularly as their anti-aircraft batteries were revised. They carried a number of small boats, including eight motor boats, a pair of motor launches, three motor pinnaces, two whale boats, two dinghies, and two small flat-bottomed boats. The compact superstructure also allowed for the aviation facilities of the ships to be expanded compared to the Dunkerques. A long quarterdeck housed a pair of catapults and a 37.5 m (123 ft) long hangar that could accommodate two Loire 130 seaplanes with their wings folded, with a third carried on top of the hangar; two more aircraft would be carried, ready to launch, on the catapults. The catapults were offset en echelon, with the starboard mount further forward than that on the port side. A large crane was used to recover the aircraft after they landed in the sea near the ship, and when not in use, it could be folded flat.

=== Machinery ===
Diagram showing the arrangement of the boilers (brown), turbines (pink), and turbo generators (dark gray)

The Richelieu-class ships were powered by four Parsons geared steam turbines and six oil-fired Sural forced-circulation boilers manufactured by Indret for Richelieu and by Penhoët and AC de la Loire for Jean Bart. The Sural boilers were experimental, and were thus a major risk to take with what were to be the most powerful capital ships of the French fleet; they nevertheless proved to be generally reliable in service. Like the Dunkerques, the Richelieus used the unit system of machinery for their propulsion system, which split the machinery into two separate systems. Three boilers were placed in one boiler room, followed by the forward engine room that housed the pair of turbines that drove the outer pair of propellers. Next astern was a second boiler room, followed by a second engine room, which powered the inner pair of screws. The arrangement offered improved damage resistance, since one system could be disabled due to battle damage and the other could remain in operation. All four screws had four blades and were 4.88 m (16 ft) in diameter. The boilers were ducted into a single funnel.

The propulsion system was rated for a total of 155,000 shaft horsepower (116,000 kW) and yielded a maximum speed of 32 knots (59 km/h; 37 mph), though with forced draft up to 175,000 shp (130,000 kW) was expected—on trials, Richelieu achieved 179,000 shp (133,000 kW) for 32.63 kn (60.43 km/h; 37.55 mph) for a brief period. The ships carried 5,773 long tons (5,866 t) of fuel oil normally, but during wartime they carried only 4,400 long tons (4,500 t) to keep as much of the belt armor above water as possible. With a full load of fuel and cruising at a speed of 15 knots (28 km/h; 17 mph), the ships could steam for 9,500 nautical miles (17,600 km; 10,900 mi). At 30 knots (56 km/h; 35 mph), the range fell to 3,450 nmi (6,390 km; 3,970 mi). Steering was controlled by a single counter-balanced rudder; the rudder could be controlled via the conning tower, the secondary conning position in the superfiring main battery turret, or directly in the steering compartment. If power to the steering gear failed completely, a backup manual steering gear that required twenty-four men to operate could be used.

Electrical power was provided by four 1,500 kW (2,000 hp) turbo generators and three 1,000 kW (1,300 hp) diesel generators, with a pair of 140 kW (190 hp) diesel generators for emergency backup power. The turbo generators provided power while the ship was underway, and two were placed in engine room #1 while the other pair were their own compartment aft of the propulsion machinery. The main diesel generators were housed in their own compartment between the magazines for the main battery turrets, and they were only used while in port. They could be overloaded to 1,250 kW (1,680 hp) for up to five minutes.

=== Armament ===
Illustration of the main battery turret

The ships were armed with eight 380 mm/45 Modèle (Mle) 1935 guns arranged in two quadruple gun turrets, (Note: /45 refers to the length of the gun in terms of calibers; a /45 gun is 45 times long as it is in bore diameter.) which were placed in a superfiring pair forward of the superstructure. The guns were supplied with a total of 832 armor-piercing shells, which weighed 884 kg (1,949 lb) and had a muzzle velocity of 830 meters per second (2,700 ft/s). Saint Chamond designed the turrets using the Dunkerque turret, which the company had also developed. The turrets were divided into two separate gun houses by a bulkhead to reduce the risk of the entire turret being disabled by a single hit. The turrets allowed elevation to 35 degrees, which provided a maximum range of 41,500 m (45,400 yd); the guns could depress to -5 degrees. Loading could be accomplished at any angle, and owing to the heavy propellant charges, the rate of fire was relatively slow, at 1.3 shot per minute.

Their secondary armament was to have consisted of fifteen 152 mm (6 in) /55 Mle 1930 guns mounted in five Mle 1936 triple turrets, three of which were arranged on the rear superstructure with the other two amidships (though neither Richelieu or Jean Bart were ever fitted with the amidships turrets). The turrets were modifications of the low-angle Mle 1930 turrets used in the La Galissonnière class of light cruisers, with improved elevation to 90 degrees to allow them to engage aerial targets. The turrets suffered from serious problems that limited their effectiveness, including slow elevation and training speeds and a tendency to jam when elevated at angles greater than 45 degrees. As a result, they could only be used for long-range barrage fire against low-flying torpedo bombers. When used against surface targets, the guns had a range of 26,500 m (29,000 yd). They were supplied with a total of 3,600 semi-AP and high explosive rounds, the former for surface targets and the latter for use against aircraft.

As designed, the light anti-aircraft battery was to have consisted of 37 mm (1.5 in) automatic guns in twin Mle 1935 mounts, but these were not ready by 1939, and so the two amidships 152 mm turrets were replaced with a group of twelve 100 mm (3.9 in) /45 Mle 1930 anti-aircraft guns in twin turrets. These were dual-purpose guns, but were outfitted primarily with time-fused shells for anti-aircraft defense, as the 152 mm guns were expected to fulfill the close-range anti-ship role. Since the automatic 37 mm guns were not available, eight 37 mm Mle 1925 semi-automatic guns in four twin mounts were added. These light guns were complemented with a battery of twenty-four 13.2 mm (0.52 in) machine guns in six quadruple mounts.

==== Fire control systems ====
Control for the ships' armament relied on five main directors. Three of them were mounted on the foremast on top of each other, with the other two aft, one for the secondary guns atop the funnel in a mack-type arrangement and the other for the main battery atop a deck house. The directors for the main battery were fitted with a 14 m (45 ft 11 in) stereoscopic rangefinder in the foremast position and an 8 m (26 ft 3 in) rangefinder in the aft position, while both turrets were fitted with their own 14 m rangefinder for operations under local control. The two upper directors for the secondary battery on the foremast had 8- and 6 m (19 ft 8 in) rangefinders while the mack director also had a 6 m rangefinder. Each secondary turret had its own 8 m rangefinder. A pair of 3 m (9 ft 10 in) rangefinders for use by an admiral's flag staff were installed on sponsons in the conning tower. The directors gathered range and bearing data on targets and transmitted it to a central processing station that fed instructions to the gun crews.

=== Protection ===
Diagram of the side armor protection layout

The ships' belt armor was 327 mm (12.9 in) thick amidships where it covered the machinery spaces and ammunition magazines; it was capped on either end by transverse bulkheads that were 355 mm (14 in) thick forward and 233 mm (9.2 in) aft. The belt was inclined at 15°24' from the vertical to increase its effectiveness against long-range fire, and it was backed with 60 mm (2.4 in) of teak planking. It consisted of a single strake of armor plate that was 6.25 m (20 ft 6 in) tall, of which 3.75 m (12 ft 4 in) was above the waterline. At its lower edge, the belt tapered to 177 mm (7 in). The main armored deck was 150 mm (5.9 in) over the machinery spaces and increased to 170 mm (6.7 in) over the magazines, backed by a layer of 15 mm (0.59 in) steel plating. The lower armor deck was 40 millimetres (1.6 in) thick on the flat and increased to 50 mm (2 in) on the sloped sides that connected to the lower edge of the armor belt. The deck was increased in thickness to 100 mm over the propeller shafts and 150 mm over the steering gear.

The main battery turrets were protected by 430 mm (17 in) of armor plate on the faces, 300 mm (12 in) on the sides, 170 to 195 mm (6.7 to 7.7 in) on the roofs, and 270 mm (11 in) on the rears of the forward turret and 260 mm (10 in) on the superfiring one. The barbettes that supported the turrets had 405 mm (15.9 in) thick armor above the main deck and reduced to 80 mm (3.1 in) below. The secondary battery turrets had 130 mm faces, 70 mm (2.8 in) sides and roofs, and 60 mm (2.4 in) rears; their barbettes were 100 mm thick. The conning tower had 340 mm (13 in) thick sides, a 280 mm (11 in) rear, and 170 mm on the roof. The tower mast was covered with light plating that was 10 mm (0.39 in) thick to protect it from strafing attacks, while the fire control directors received 20 mm (0.79 in) of plating.

The ships' underwater protection system was based on the system used in the Dunkerque class. The void between the armor belt and the outer hull plating was filled with a rubber-based compound referred to as ébonite mousse; the material was used to absorb the impact of an explosion and prevent water from flooding uncontrollably. Behind this compartment there was a bulkhead that was 18 mm (0.71 in) thick; the compartment created between this bulkhead and the ébonite mousse was used to store fuel oil in peacetime, but was kept empty in combat conditions. Further inboard, a 30 mm (1.2 in) torpedo bulkhead would contain the blast effects of a torpedo or mine detonation. This bulkhead was increased to 40 to 50 mm (1.6 to 2.0 in) abreast of the secondary magazines and the forward main battery turret, as the narrowing hull reduced the total width of the underwater protection system. Additional ébonite mousse was placed between the torpedo bulkhead and the fuel tanks for additional flooding control. The compound was also used in compartments on either end of transverse bulkheads to ensure that the central citadel remained watertight.

=== Clemenceau and Gascogne variants ===
By 1937, tensions in Europe had increased significantly as Germany and Italy took increasingly aggressive positions, raising the likelihood of war in the near future. German naval construction was at that time directed against France; the two Scharnhorst-class battleships had been laid down to counter the Dunkerques and the two Bismarck-class battleships had been ordered to match the two Richelieus. Since the two French battleships had been ordered in response to the expanding Italian fleet, the French naval command determined that another pair of battleships would be needed to balance the Bismarcks. Two ships were authorized on 2 May 1938 under the names Clemenceau and Gascogne. But delays in the construction program, owing to a shortage of dockyards large enough to handle additional hulls of this size, allowed time for additional design studies at the request of the naval command.

The command wanted to compare their new ships with the latest foreign contemporaries; they noted that all other battleships carried their main armament forward and aft, and several of them used dedicated high and low-angle guns for their secondary batteries. The 130 mm dual-purpose guns used on the Dunkerques were proving to be troublesome in service, and the command wanted to determine whether the arrangement would be suitable for future construction. Vice-Amiral François Darlan, who had by now replaced Durand-Viel as Chief of Staff, issued a request for studies on 2 December 1937 with the requirements that the proposals be based on the Richelieu design, armed with eight or nine 380 mm guns in quadruple or triple turrets, equipped with a secondary battery of 152 mm or 130 mm dual-purpose guns or a mixed battery of 152 mm and 100 mm guns, and with armor on the same scale as Richelieu. A series of proposals were submitted, ranging from effective repeats of the Richelieu design with minor improvements (the Project A series) to plans that shifted the superfiring main battery turret aft of the superstructure (the Project B series), to the nine-gun variants that kept two triple turrets forward and a third aft (the Project C series). All three basic formats included several variations that incorporated changes to the composition and arrangement of the secondary and anti-aircraft batteries.

The Project C variants all displaced close to 40,000 long tons (41,000 t) and thus were not seriously considered, as they exceeded the displacement limits by a wide margin. The designers submitted the A and B variants to Darlan on 19 March 1938 and he chose one version of each for Clemenceau and Gascogne, respectively. As a result, the former would retain the basic Richelieu layout, while the latter would adopt an arrangement with one main battery turret shifted aft. Both variants necessitated significant changes to the arrangement of other equipment, including the light anti-aircraft batteries and aviation facilities, but Gascogne required much more radical work. The rest of the naval command preferred the B version adopted for Gascogne and questioned why Darlan had approved the A variant for Clemenceau; he stated that he hoped to be able to lay down the third Richelieu-class ship in late 1938 and that the necessary redesign work for the hull interior that the B variant required would delay construction by twelve months at a minimum. The command concurred and authorization for the next ship was issued on 24 August.

==== Clemenceau specifications ====
General characteristics (Planned specifications)
- Displacement: Standard: 35,000 long tons (36,000 t); Full load: 44,100 long tons (44,800 t)
- Complement: 1,670
- Armament: 8 × 380 mm /45 guns; 12 × 152 mm /50 guns; 12 × 100 mm AA guns; 12 × 37 mm AA guns; 32 × 13.2 mm Hotchkiss machine guns
- Armor: Belt: 320 mm (13 in)

The most significant change to the design for Clemenceau was to the arrangement of the secondary and anti-aircraft batteries. The number of triple 152 mm turrets was reduced to four, with two amidships wing turrets and two turrets on the centerline aft of the superstructure. Though the number of guns was reduced, the new arrangement actually secured the same broadside, as three turrets could still be brought to bear to either side of the ship. In an effort to keep displacement from growing too much, the belt armor was reduced to 320 mm (13 in). The hangar would have to be shortened to accommodate the centerline arrangement of the 152 mm guns, but the hangar would also be widened to allow two aircraft to be stored side by side, thus preserving the same complement as Richelieu.

The reduction in weight achieved by the removal of one of these turrets allowed for the adoption of new dual-purpose 100 mm Mle 1937 autocannon; six of these twin mounts were to be installed around the forward superstructure, four abreast the rear superstructure and two between the conning tower and the main battery. These were the same guns that had been adopted for Richelieu during construction, but the mounts were new, fully enclosed gun turrets compared to the open mounts aboard the earlier vessel. Six new 37 mm ACAD twin mounts would be added to supplement the 100 mm guns; four of these would be placed a deck higher and further inboard than the 100 mm guns aft and the other two would be placed on either side of the superfiring main turret. These guns proved to be problematic during development, owing to excessive barrel wear that resulted from its very high muzzle velocity and the weight of the projectile. Efforts to correct the problem had delayed the adoption of this gun for the earlier Richelieus and it never actually entered service apart from a prototype installed on the aviso Amiens. Additional fire control directors were installed for the new guns.

To keep design delays to a minimum, internal compartments were kept as similar to Richelieu as possible; existing magazines for the 152 mm guns were modified to store ammunition for the 100 mm and 37 mm guns. Standard displacement was kept at 35,000 tons to comply with the Washington Treaty limits, but full load displacement increased slightly to 44,100 long tons (44,800 t) owing to the additional anti-aircraft guns. The ship was in most respects identical to her half-sisters, with the same dimensions and propulsion system, main battery, and armor layout. The increases to her anti-aircraft armament brought her crew up to a total of 1,670 officers and men.

==== Gascogne specifications ====
General characteristics (Planned specifications)
- Displacement: Standard: 35,000 long tons (36,000 t); Full load: 43,736 long tons (44,438 t)
- Complement: 1,670
- Armament: 8 × 380 mm /45 guns; 9 × 152 mm /50 guns; 16 × 100 mm AA guns; 12 × 37 mm AA guns; 36 × 13.2 mm Hotchkiss machine guns
- Armor: Belt: 320 mm
- Aircraft carried: 3 × SNCAC NC.420

Gascogne represented a much more radical redesign; the superfiring main battery turret was moved to the quarterdeck, with the three secondary turrets moved to the centerline. Two superfired over the forward main battery turret and the third superfired aft. Rearranging the primary and secondary batteries had several benefits, most significantly freeing up the sides of the ship for the anti-aircraft battery, where they would be further from the blast effects of the larger guns. It also allowed all-around fire for the main and secondary batteries, as opposed to the other designs that had a fairly wide blind arc astern for the main guns. But it also presented problems for the design staff, since the superstructure would have to be moved forward to have enough space aft for the main battery turret and magazine, which then required extensive redesign of the hull to move the machinery spaces and keep a proper trim.

It also forced the aviation facilities to be completely redesigned, as the aft main turret occupied the space that had previously housed the hangar. The designers eventually settled on the solution that American battleship designers had adopted, using an internal hangar in the hull with a crane to lift aircraft onto a single catapult. Only three aircraft could be stored with this system, however: two in the hangar and one on the catapult. The ship would carry the SNCAC NC.420 floatplane, which had been developed to replace the Loire 130.

Another major effect of the main battery rearrangement was the need to lengthen the belt armor, which necessitated alterations to keep displacement in check. The compartment filled with ébonite mousse was shortened and partially converted to fuel storage. The secondary turrets received thicker armor protection as compensation for the reduction in number of guns, though the increases were limited by the power of the motors that operated the turrets. Displacement was reduced slightly.

== Construction ==
Construction data
Ship	Namesake	Builder	Laid down	Launched	Commissioned
Richelieu	Armand-Jean du Plessis, Cardinal de Richelieu	Arsenal de Brest	22 October 1935	17 January 1939	15 July 1940 (Vichy France); 10 October 1943 (Free French Forces)
Jean Bart	Jean Bart	Chantiers de Penhoët, Saint-Nazaire	12 December 1936	6 March 1940	1 May 1955
Clemenceau	Georges Clemenceau	Arsenal de Brest	17 January 1939	—N/a	—N/a
Gascogne	Gascony	Chantiers de Penhoët, Saint-Nazaire	—N/a	—N/a	—N/a

== Service history ==
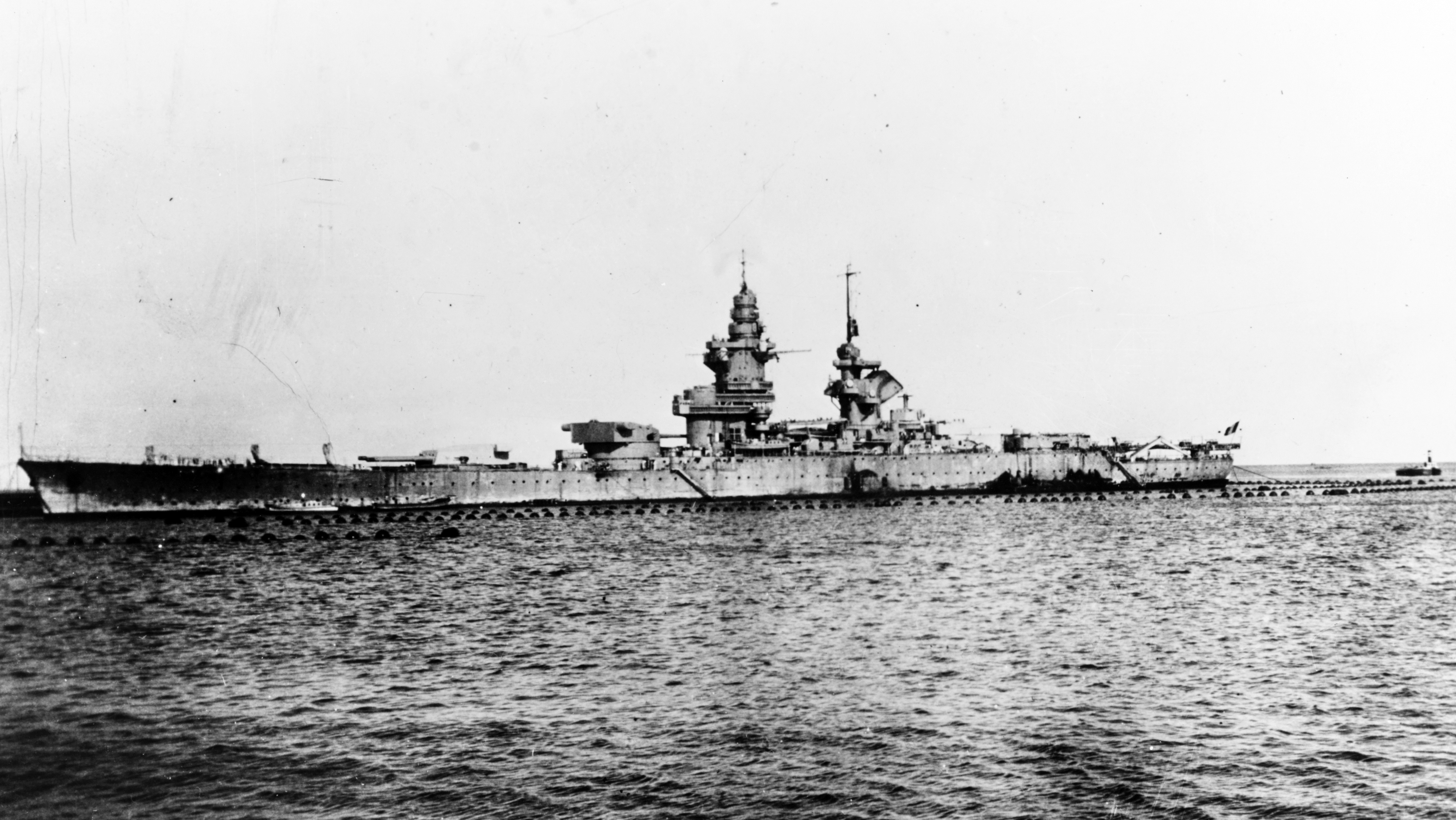
Richelieu in Dakar in 1940

=== Richelieu ===
Work on Richelieu was expedited as war with Germany became increasingly likely in 1939, and she was completed just days before the Germans won the Battle of France in June 1940. The ship, still missing most of its anti-aircraft guns, fled to Dakar in French West Africa to keep her under French control. There, she came under repeated British attacks that had been intended to either compel the battleship to join the Free French Naval Forces or sink her. The first, during Operation Catapult in July 1940, centered on attacks by Fairey Swordfish torpedo bombers that scored one torpedo hit but did not do serious damage. The second attack, resulting in the Battle of Dakar, followed in September and involved a planned landing of Free French Forces to seize the colony. A pair of British battleships—Barham and Resolution—attacked the ship at long range, though fire from Richelieu and nearby coastal batteries kept the British at bay until the submarine Bévéziers torpedoed and badly damaged Resolution, forcing the British to withdraw. Richelieu had been hit once in the battle, and more importantly for her state of readiness, three of her main battery guns had exploded from faulty shells during the action.

After the Allied invasion of North Africa in November 1942 that resulted in the defection of significant parts of the French overseas empire, Richelieu was transferred to Free French control. She was sent to the United States for permanent repairs and modernization to bring the ship up to the latest American and British standards, including a powerful anti-aircraft battery of fifty-six 40 mm (1.6 in) Bofors guns and forty-eight 20 mm (0.79 in) Oerlikon autocannon, though the US Navy refused to share its most advanced radars with the French. After completing the overhaul and modernization, the ship served with the British Home Fleet in early 1944; there, she served as part of the force guarding against the German battleship Tirpitz that threatened the convoy lanes to the Soviet Union. She saw no action during this period, as the German fleet remained in port, largely the result of crippling fuel shortages.

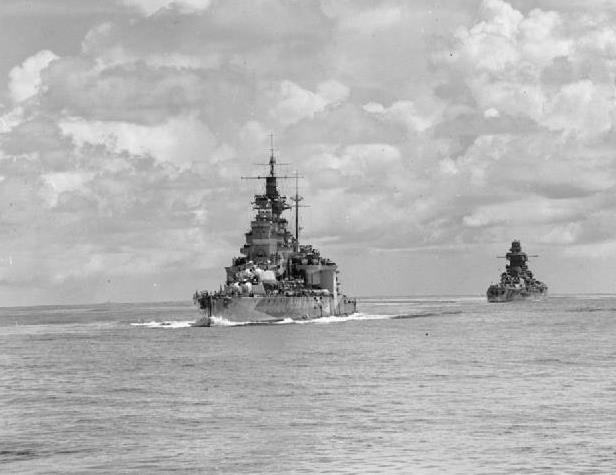
Richelieu astern of HMS Valiant during Operation Bishop

In April, she was transferred to reinforce the Eastern Fleet for operations against the Japanese in the Indian Ocean. These included escorting British and American aircraft carriers as they struck Japanese facilities in the occupied Dutch East Indies and several bombardment operations that revealed problems with excessive shell dispersion from her main battery guns. During this period, she was present for Operations Cockpit, Transom, Pedal, and Crimson. The ship returned to France for a refit in late 1944 that also included installation of more advanced radar sets. She arrived back in the Indian Ocean in January 1945 for further operations in the area, including Operations Sunfish, Bishop, and Dukedom, the latter an attempt to ambush and destroy a Japanese heavy cruiser and destroyer in May that resulted in the Battle of the Malacca Strait. Richelieu was too far away to engage the Japanese ships before they were sunk by other vessels. Richelieu then went to South Africa for another refit and by the time this was completed in mid-August, Japan had surrendered, ending the war.

Richelieu was part of the force that liberated Singapore and other parts of the Dutch East Indies following the official Japanese surrender in September, during which she detonated a magnetic mine but suffered little damage. She thereafter operated in French Indochina as part of the initial effort to restore French colonial rule. There, she provided fire support to French forces fighting in the colony during Operation Mapor. Recalled to France in December 1945, she was repaired and modernized slightly in 1946. Testing determined the cause of the shell dispersion issue and modifications were made to the turrets to delay the outer guns by 60 milliseconds, which corrected the problem. The ship saw relatively limited peacetime training in the immediate postwar years and in 1952, she was removed from active service for use as a gunnery training ship. In 1956, she was placed in reserve and was thereafter used as a stationary training vessel and barracks ship until 1967, when the French Navy decided to discard her. Sold for scrap in 1968, she was broken up in Italy from 1968 to 1969.

=== Jean Bart ===
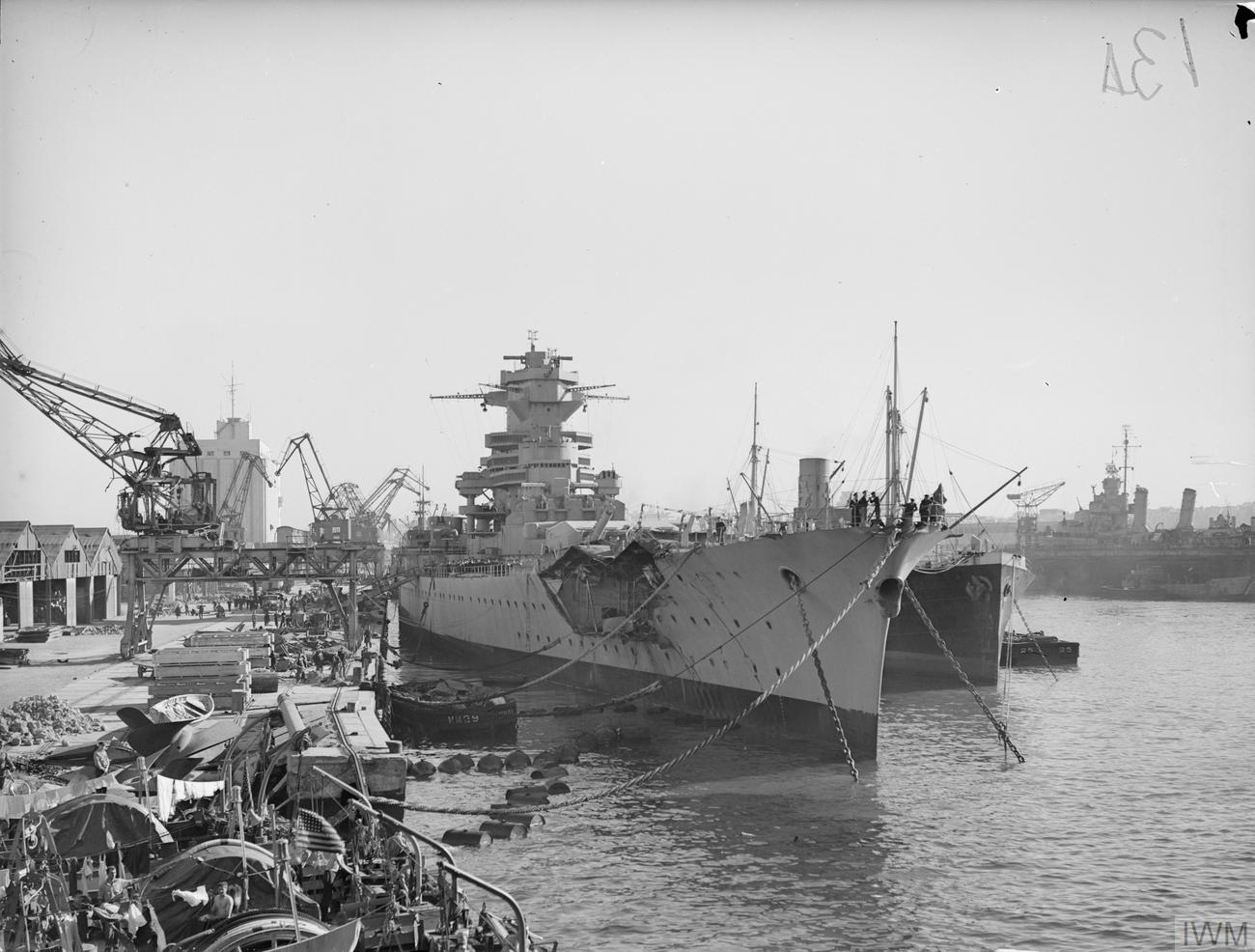
Jean Bart under repair in Casablanca, January 1943

Jean Bart had only recently been launched by the beginning of the Battle of France in May 1940, so the shipyard focused as much effort on getting the ship ready for sea as possible. The workers focused on installing the turbines and boilers to allow her to get underway. With German forces approaching Saint-Nazaire, Jean Bart was rushed through a hastily dredged channel to escape via the Atlantic Ocean south to Casablanca. By that time, she had only one of her main turrets installed, along with a handful of anti-aircraft guns, some of which had been scrounged from another vessel in the harbor. Shell handling equipment and ammunition hoists were not completed for the main battery, and the only usable guns were three 37 mm and six of the 13.2 mm mounts. After being attacked and hit once (but not seriously damaged) by German Heinkel He 111 bombers while en route, the ship reached Casablanca with an escort of two destroyers on 22 June.

While in Casablanca, the French attempted to prepare the ship for action as much as was possible in light of limited infrastructure and the lack of many necessary parts to complete the vessel. The facilities there were not capable of completing the second main battery turret, nor were the Germans interested in allowing the needed armor plates and guns to be shipped there. Instead, to protect the ship's interior, the French covered the open barbette with concrete; the empty secondary barbettes received the same coverings. A makeshift fire control director was installed in 1941, but it proved to be unreliable and so an ad hoc director system was set up using shore-based observation points to triangulate targets for the main battery. Her anti-aircraft armament was slowly strengthened as guns became available and a search radar was fitted in 1942. Unlike her sister, Jean Bart was not targeted by British forces during this period.

In November, American and British forces invaded French North Africa in Operation Torch; Jean Bart initially helped to resist the attack, engaging in a gunnery duel with the American battleship USS Massachusetts and heavy cruisers on the first day of the invasion. Hit several times by 406 mm (16 in) shells from Massachusetts, one of which jammed her operational turret, Jean Bart was nevertheless not seriously damaged and unknown to the Americans, her main battery remained in operation after damaged armor plate was cut away later that day. The next morning, after engaging the American heavy cruiser Augusta at long range, Jean Bart came under heavy air attack from American dive bombers and was badly damaged by a pair of 1,000-pound (450 kg) bombs. She sank by the stern in the shallow harbor, but her guns remained serviceable.

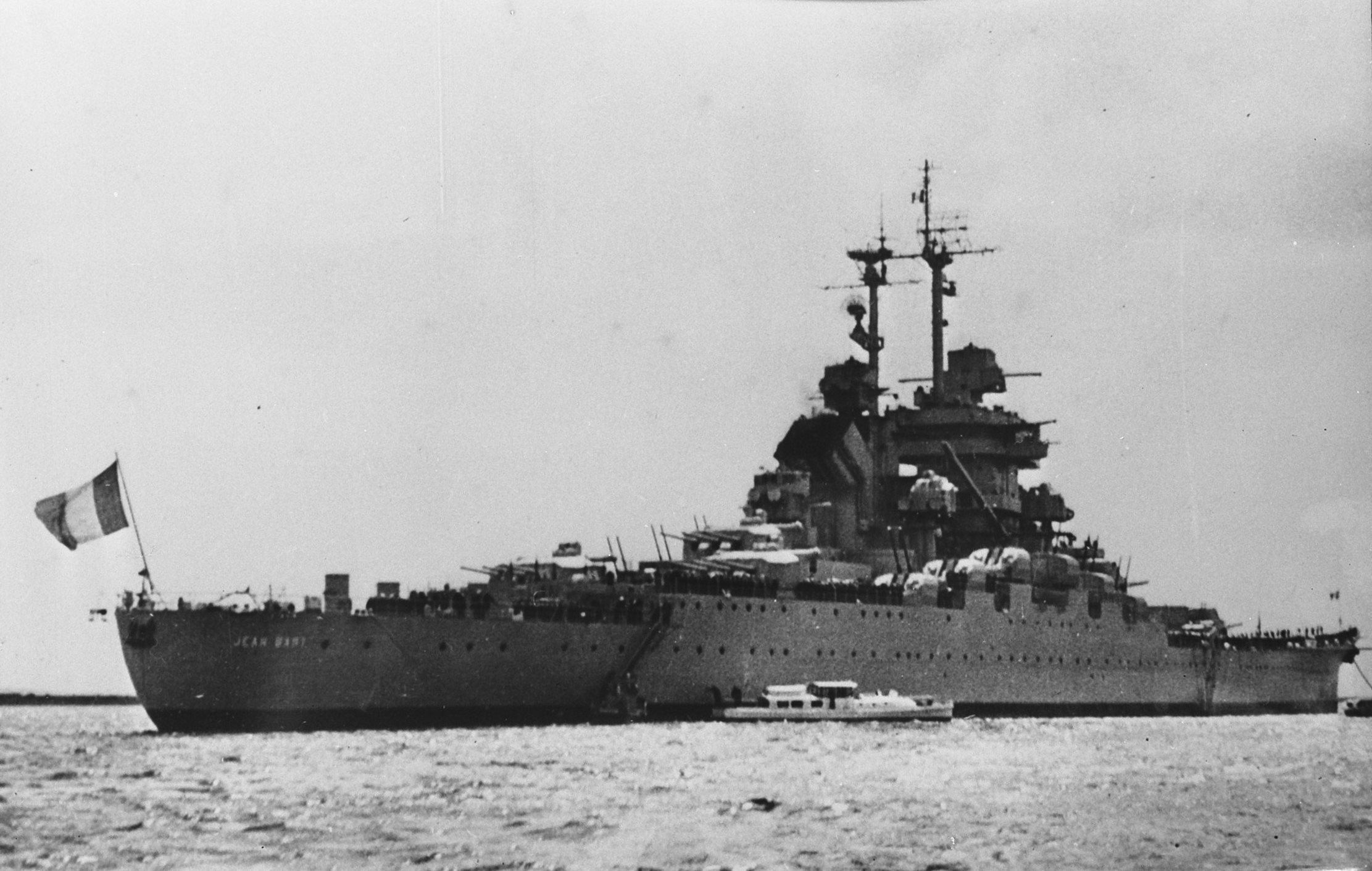
Jean Bart passing through the Suez Canal in 1956

Following the defection of French forces in the region to the Allied side, the French attempted to have the ship completed in the United States. They submitted proposals to complete the vessel to modified designs, including one with as many as thirty-four 5 in (130 mm) /38 caliber dual-purpose guns for use as an anti-aircraft battleship, but the requests came to nothing as the US Navy had no interest in the project. By that stage of the war, the American and British fleets had a more than sufficient number of modern battleships for their purposes, and the American shipyards available would not have been able to manufacture the necessary parts. Jean Bart was accordingly repaired as much as possible in Casablanca, though this work was hampered by the fact that French shipyards were either still under German occupation or had been wrecked during the war. Nevertheless, shipyard workers had repaired her hull damage by September 1943, and she spent the rest of the war as a training ship in the Mediterranean Sea.

In 1945, discussions as to the fate of the ship considered converting her into an aircraft carrier, finishing her as a battleship, or discarding her altogether. Since the carrier conversion would have produced a mediocre vessel at great expense and effort, the decision was ultimately made to finish her as a battleship, a process that took several years. Most work on the ship was completed by 1955, when she formally entered active service, and she conducted two overseas cruises to visit Denmark and the United States shortly thereafter. She took part in the French intervention in the Suez Crisis in November 1956, including a brief four-shot bombardment of Port Said. Reduced to reserve in August 1957, she was used as a barracks ship until 1961. She remained, unused, in the French Navy's inventory until 1970 when she was struck from the naval register and sold for scrap.

=== Clemenceau and Gascogne ===
Clemenceau was laid down on 17 January 1939 at the Salou No. 4 dock in Brest, directly after Richelieu had been launched from that dock earlier that day. Owing to the increased tensions with Germany, work on the ship was expedited and she was slated to be launched in 1941, with completion projected for late 1943. On 28 September 1939, work was halted temporarily as the French had begun large-scale mobilization for the war with Germany, which reduced the available workforce. What men were available were allocated to Richelieu, since she was nearing completion. The shipyard resumed work on 6 December during the "phony war", but progress was slow and only 10 percent of the hull—a length of about 130 m (426 ft 6 in)—had been assembled by 10 June, when work again halted in the wake of German victories. When German forces approached Brest, the shipyard workers flooded the drydock. The ship was seized by the Germans, renamed Schlachtschiff R (Battleship R), with consideration briefly given to completing the ship, but shortages of materials and shipyard workers rendered it an unrealistic project. The hull was floated out in 1941 so the slipway could be used for other purposes. According to the historians John Jordan and Robert Dumas, the hull was then moored in front of the U-boat pen in Brest, though Henri Le Masson states that she was towed to Landévennec in the roadstead of Brest. Allied bombers sank the hulk on 27 August 1944 and after the war, the navy placed the wreck for sale on 23 February 1948. There were no buyers, so the navy refloated the vessel to clear the harbor bottom and while under tow it broke in half and sank again. Salvors eventually purchased the wreck on 1 August 1951.

Gascogne was never laid down, as she had to wait until Jean Bart was launched, by which time the war had begun. Orders for material had been placed in June 1939, but further work was stopped on 28 September before restarting on 12 April 1940. Approximately six percent of hull materials had been manufactured by 1 June with a view toward laying the ship down at some point in the following months, with a projected launching in 1942 and completion by June 1944, but the events of June 1940 of course precluded any work being started.
