= 380 mm/45 Modèle 1935 gun =

380mm/45 Modèle 1935
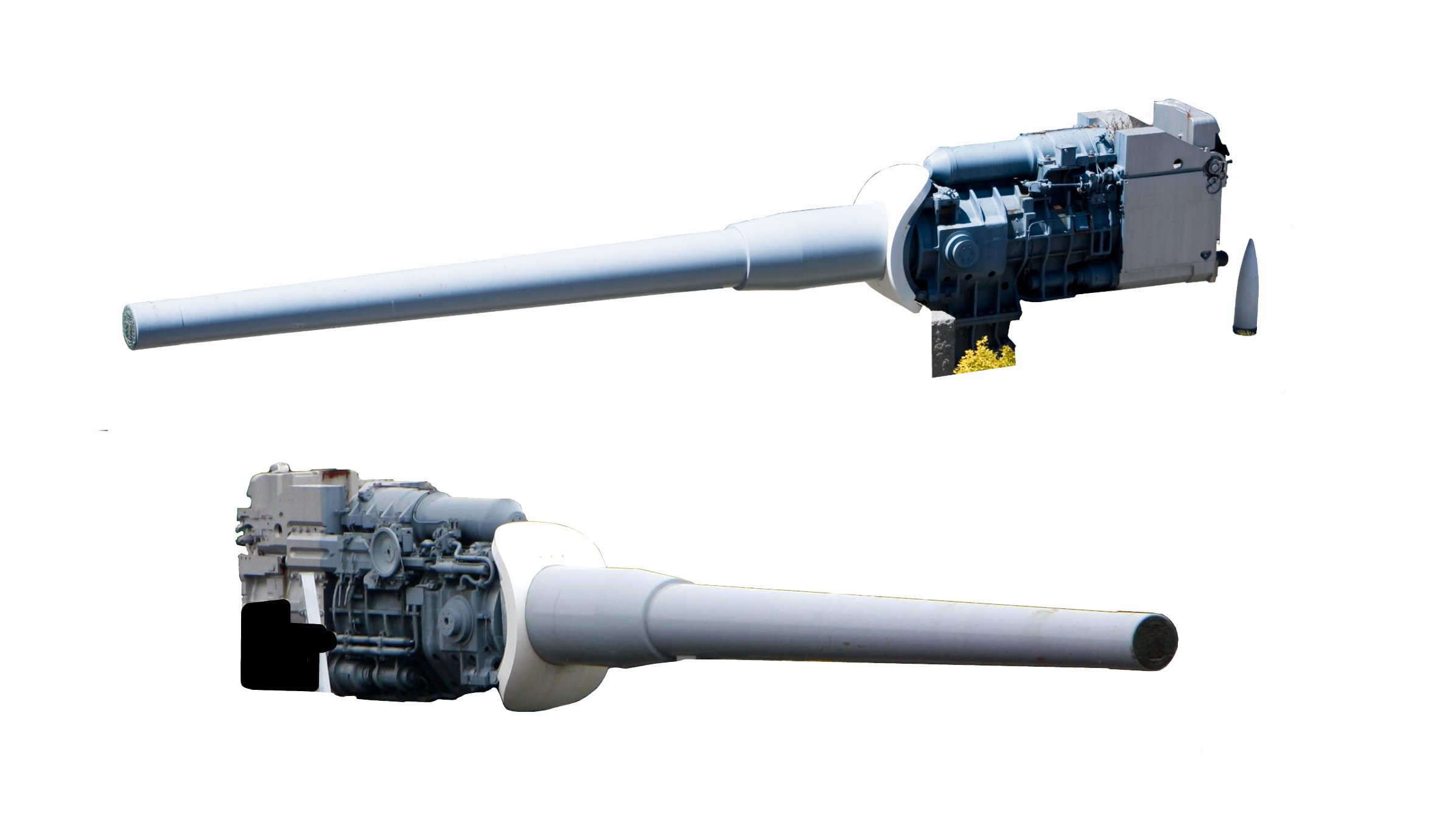
- Remaining gun under Recouvrance Bridge, Brest
- Type: naval gun
- Place of origin: France

Service history
- In service: 1935–1969
- Used by: France
- Wars: Second World War, Suez Crisis

Production history
- Designed: 1935
- No. built: 16 guns

Specifications
- Mass: Turret: 2,476 tonnes Single Gun: 94.13 tonnes
- Length: 17.882 m (58 ft 8 in)
- Barrel length: 17.257 m (56 ft 7 in)
- Shell: AP: 884 kilograms (1,950 lb) separate charges and shell
- Calibre: 380 mm (15 in)
- Breech: Welin breech block, hydro-pneumatically powered
- Recoil: 132.5 cm (4 ft 4 in)
- Elevation: 6°/s
- Traverse: 300°, 5°/s
- Rate of fire: 1.8 /min
- Muzzle velocity: 830 m/s (2,700 ft/s)
- Maximum firing range: 41,700 m (45,600 yd) 35° elevation, streamlined shell

The 380mm/45 Modèle 1935 gun was a heavy naval gun of the French Navy. It was the largest calibre naval gun ever fielded in French service.

== History ==
The built-up guns were used on the two battleships of the Richelieu class, Richelieu and Jean Bart. They were mounted in quadruple turrets, which allowed mounting all the main battery at the bow, and saved weight on turret armour in the context of the Washington Naval Treaty.

During World War II seven guns were captured by the Germans and three of these were taken to Norway. It was planned to install them in a coastal battery at Vardaasen (MKB 6./501 Nötteröy), using Bettungsschiessgerüst (Firing platform) C/39 armoured single mounts, but the war ended before the battery became operational. In 1949 the guns were returned to France (in exchange for 3 German 38 cm SKC/34 from Todt Battery) where they were then refurbished at the Ruelle Foundry.

Five guns remain: one is on display at the Arsenal of Brest, under Recouvrance Bridge; another at Lanvéoc at the École Navale; and a third gun survives at Gâvres, near Lorient. Two others are on display, at Ruelle and at La Spezia. The honour room of the École Navale also displays two 380mm shells and tampions.

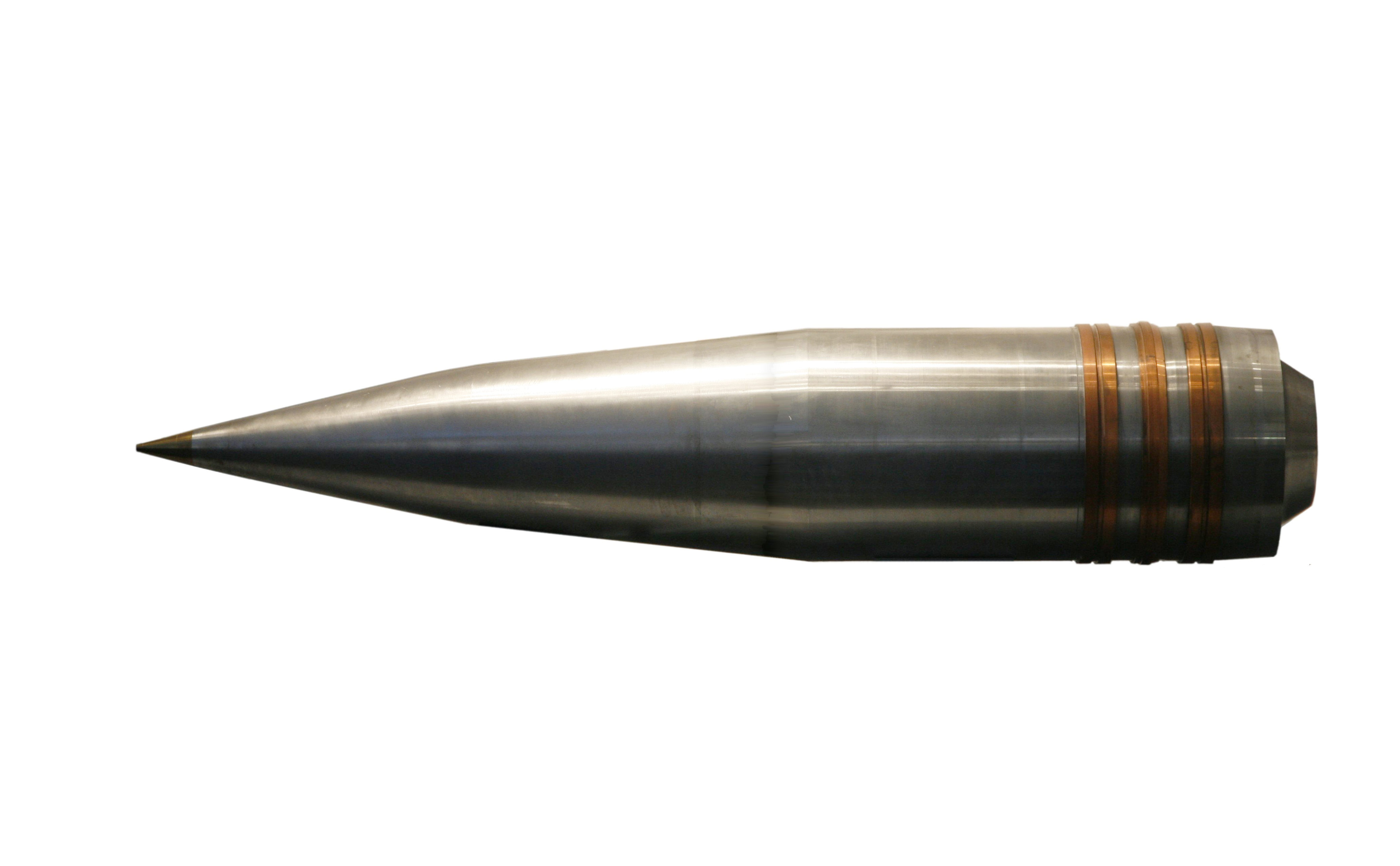
Shell on display at the Musée national de la Marine

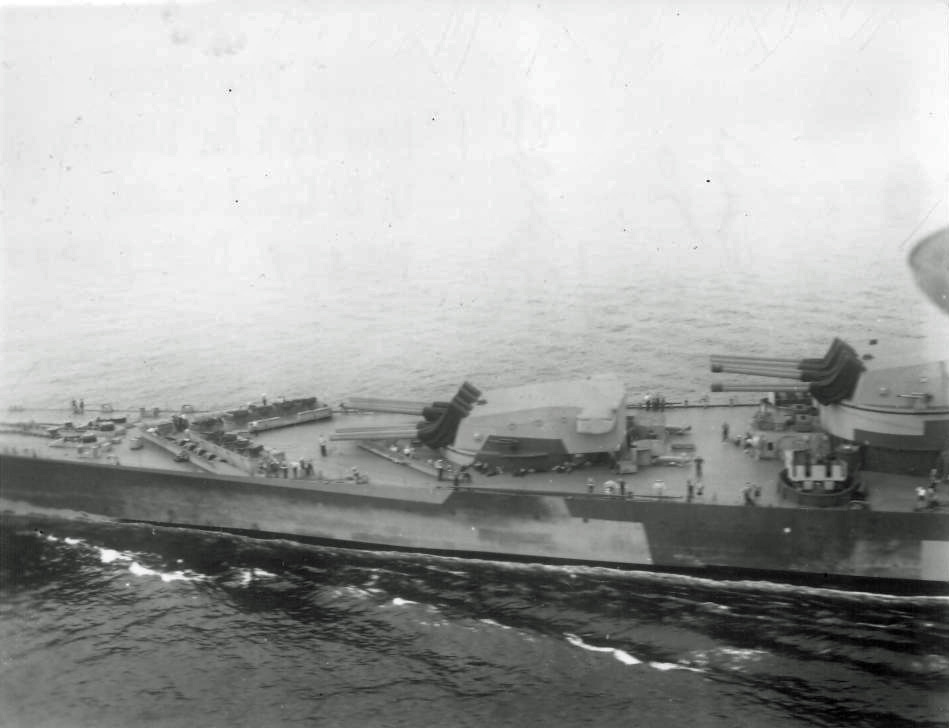
Battleship Richelieu en route to New York in 1943

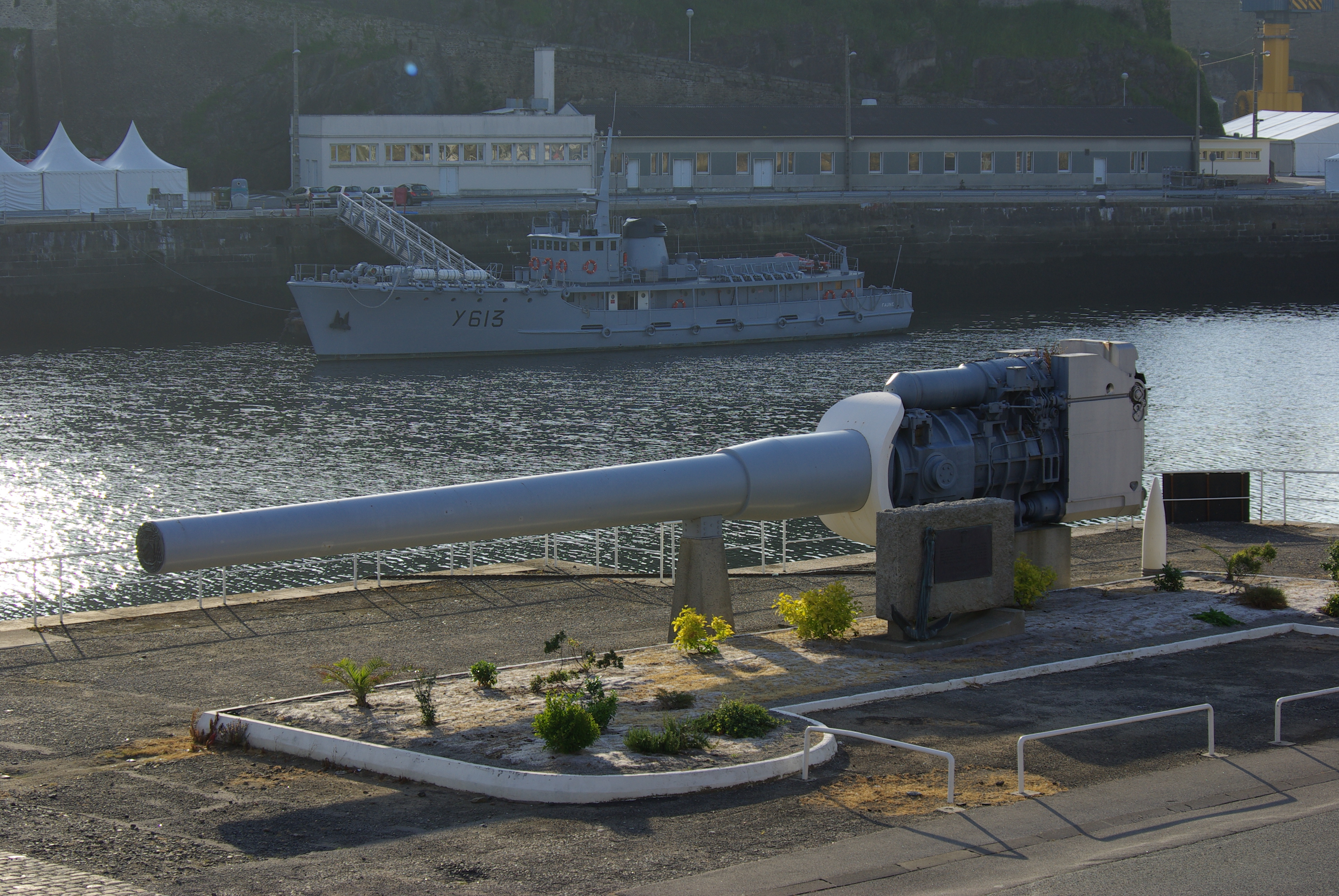
One of the five remaining 380mm/45 Modèle 1935 guns of Richelieu, by the Penfeld river in Brest.

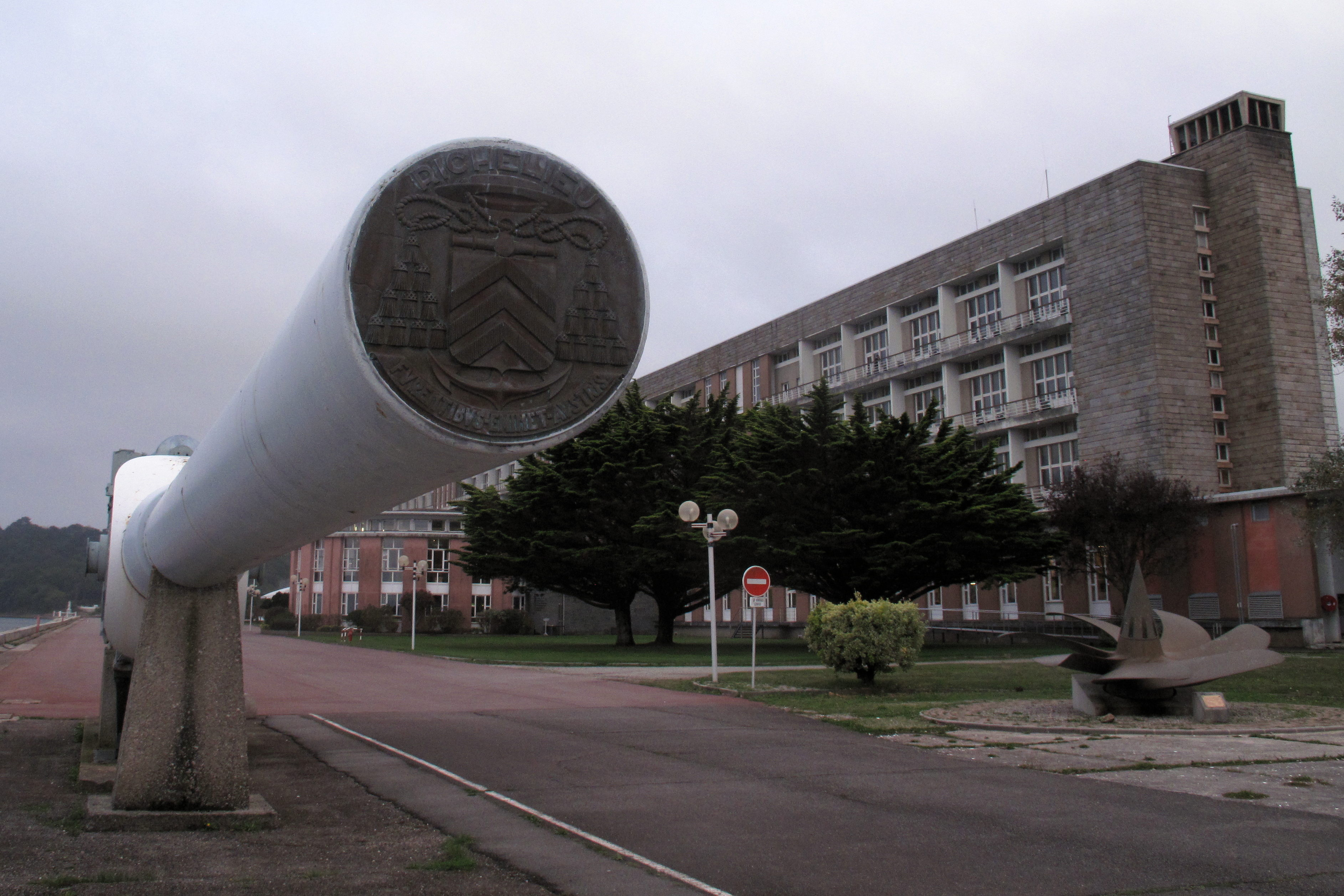
The gun of Lanvéoc at the École Navale, in front of the Orion building

== See also ==
=== Weapons of comparable role, performance and era ===
- 381mm / 50 Model 1934 naval gun : Italian equivalent
- 38 cm SK C/34 naval gun : German equivalent
- BL 15-inch Mk I naval gun: British equivalent

== Bibliography ==
- Wahl, Jean-Bernard (2008). "Installés par les Allemands en batterie côtière en Norvège, retour en France des canons de 380 du Jean-Bart". Bunkerarchéo (in French): 44–57.
