= French aircraft carrier Joffre =

Incompleted French aircraft carrier

- Profile view of Joffre

History

France
- Name: Joffre
- Namesake: Joseph Joffre
- Builder: Ateliers et Chantiers de Saint-Nazaire Penhoët
- Laid down: 26 November 1938
- Fate: Construction stopped in 1940

General characteristics
- Class & type: Joffre-class aircraft carrier
- Displacement: 20,000 tons (normal)
- Length: 236 m (774 ft 3 in); 228 m (748 ft 0 in) between perpendiculars
- Beam: 24.5 m (80 ft) (waterline); 11 m (35 ft) (overall)
- Draught: 6.5 m (21 ft)
- Installed power: 8 boilers; 125,000 shp (93,000 kW)
- Propulsion: Steam turbines; 2 shafts
- Speed: 33 knots (61 km/h; 38 mph)
- Range: 7,000 nmi (13,000 km; 8,100 mi) at 20 kn (37 km/h; 23 mph); 3,000 nmi (5,600 km; 3,500 mi) at 33 kn (61 km/h; 38 mph)
- Complement: 1,251
- Armament: 8 × 130 mm DP guns; 8 × 37 mm AA guns; 24 × 13.2 mm AA guns
- Armour: Belt 100 mm (3.9 in); Deck 40 to 70 mm (1.6 to 2.8 in)
- Aircraft carried: 40
- Aviation facilities: Flight deck 200 m × 28 m (656 ft 2 in × 91 ft 10 in); 2 lifts; 9 arrester wires,

Joffre was the planned lead ship of her class of aircraft carriers for the French Navy. She was named in honour of Joseph Joffre. The ship was laid down in 1938, but never launched.

== Description ==
After several experimentations on the aircraft carrier Béarn, the French Navy decided to have two full-fledged aircraft carriers built as replacement. They were to be 18,000 tons (Washington) with a protection limited to the hull and comparable to that of a light cruiser. Armament was to include dual-purpose guns fore and aft of the island, and several light anti-aircraft guns. The flight deck, which was offset to port to counterbalance the weight of the unusually large island, ran to the bows but stopped before the poop because one external lift was to be installed aft of the flight deck. The other lift was T-shaped and installed in front of the island. The ship had two superimposed hangars, the upper being 159 by 21 metres (521 ft 8 in × 68 ft 11 in) and the lower 70 by 16 metres (229 ft 8 in × 52 ft 6 in).

The ships were to operate an air group of around 40 planes, including 15 Dewoitine D.790 fighters (a navalised version of the Dewoitine D.520) and 25 Breguet 810 twin-engine attack planes (a navalised version of the Breguet 693) for level bombing, torpedo missions and scouting.

== History ==
Joffre was laid down on 26 November 1938 at the shipyards of Ateliers et Chantiers de Saint-Nazaire Penhoët, but work was slowed by the start of World War II. The work was ultimately halted in June 1940 when France fell to German invasion. At this time, the ship was 20% complete. The assembled hull was later scrapped in the dock.

In World War II there was an attempt by Francoist Spain to buy the ship under construction and use it in the Spanish Navy, but it did not succeed.

== Bibliography ==
- Chesneau, Roger, ed. (1980). Conway's All the World's Fighting Ships 1922–1946. Greenwich: Conway Maritime Press. ISBN 0-85177-146-7.
- Francis Dousset, Les porte-avions français des origines (1911) à nos jours, 1978 éditions de la Cité, ISBN 2-85186-015-1
- Jordan, John (2010). "PA16 Joffre: France's Carrier Project of 1938". In Jordan, John (ed.). Warship 2010. London: Conway. pp. 60–76. ISBN 978-1-84486-110-1.
