= Ateliers et Chantiers de Saint-Nazaire Penhoët =

Ateliers et Chantiers de Penhoët
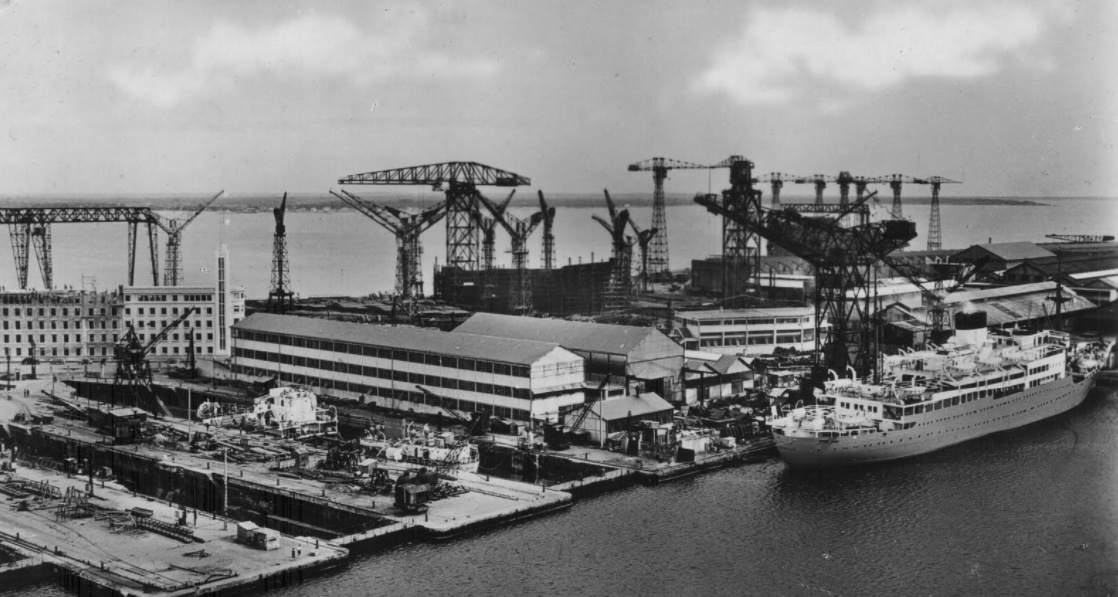
- The Penhoët shipyard in the 20th century
- Type: Shipbuilding company
- Industry: Shipbuilding
- Founded: 1861
- Founder: John Scott
- Defunct: 1955
- Fate: Merged with Ateliers et Chantiers de la Loire
- Successor: Chantiers de l’Atlantique
- Headquarters: Saint-Nazaire, France
- Area served: Worldwide
- Products: Merchant ships, naval vessels

Ateliers et Chantiers de Penhoët was a major French shipbuilding company based at Saint-Nazaire. The shipyard existed in several successive forms between 1861 and 1955, beginning with an early yard founded by Scottish engineer John Scott and later developing into one of France’s principal builders of merchant ships and naval vessels. In 1955 the company merged with the Ateliers et Chantiers de la Loire to form Chantiers de l’Atlantique, its modern successor.

== History ==
=== Origins (1861–1871): The Scott and Océan eras ===
Shipbuilding at Penhoët began in 1861, when John Scott, a Scottish engineer, established a yard at Saint‑Nazaire under the ownership of the Compagnie Générale Transatlantique (CGT). Known informally as the Chantiers Scott, the yard operated until 1866, when financial difficulties forced its closure. Management passed to the Compagnie des Chantiers et Ateliers de l’Océan in 1867, but the site closed definitively in 1871.

A short‑lived revival attempt under the name Chantiers de l’Océan operated between 1869 and 1870, but it was unsuccessful and the yard again fell dormant.

=== Re‑establishment and growth (1881–1900): Chantiers et Ateliers de Penhoët ===
The shipyard was permanently revived in 1881 as the Chantiers et Ateliers de Penhoët, again under the aegis of CGT. This revival coincided with major port expansion, including the construction of the Bassin de Penhoët, inaugurated on 8 May 1881. The nearby Forges de Trignac supplied steel and iron plates for hull construction, enabling the yard to expand into large steel shipbuilding.

Between 1881 and 1900, the yard primarily built passenger liners for CGT.

=== Reorganisation and industrial expansion (1900–1955): Société des Chantiers et Ateliers de Saint‑Nazaire–Penhoët ===
In 1900, the company was reorganised and renamed the Société des Chantiers et Ateliers de Saint‑Nazaire–Penhoët. Under this name, the yard expanded significantly and became one of France’s major shipbuilders.

During the 1920s, the company also operated a second yard at Le Grand-Quevilly, near Rouen.

At Saint‑Nazaire, the Penhoët yard produced both merchant ships and naval vessels, including submarines such as Le Conquérant, built between 1930 and 1934.

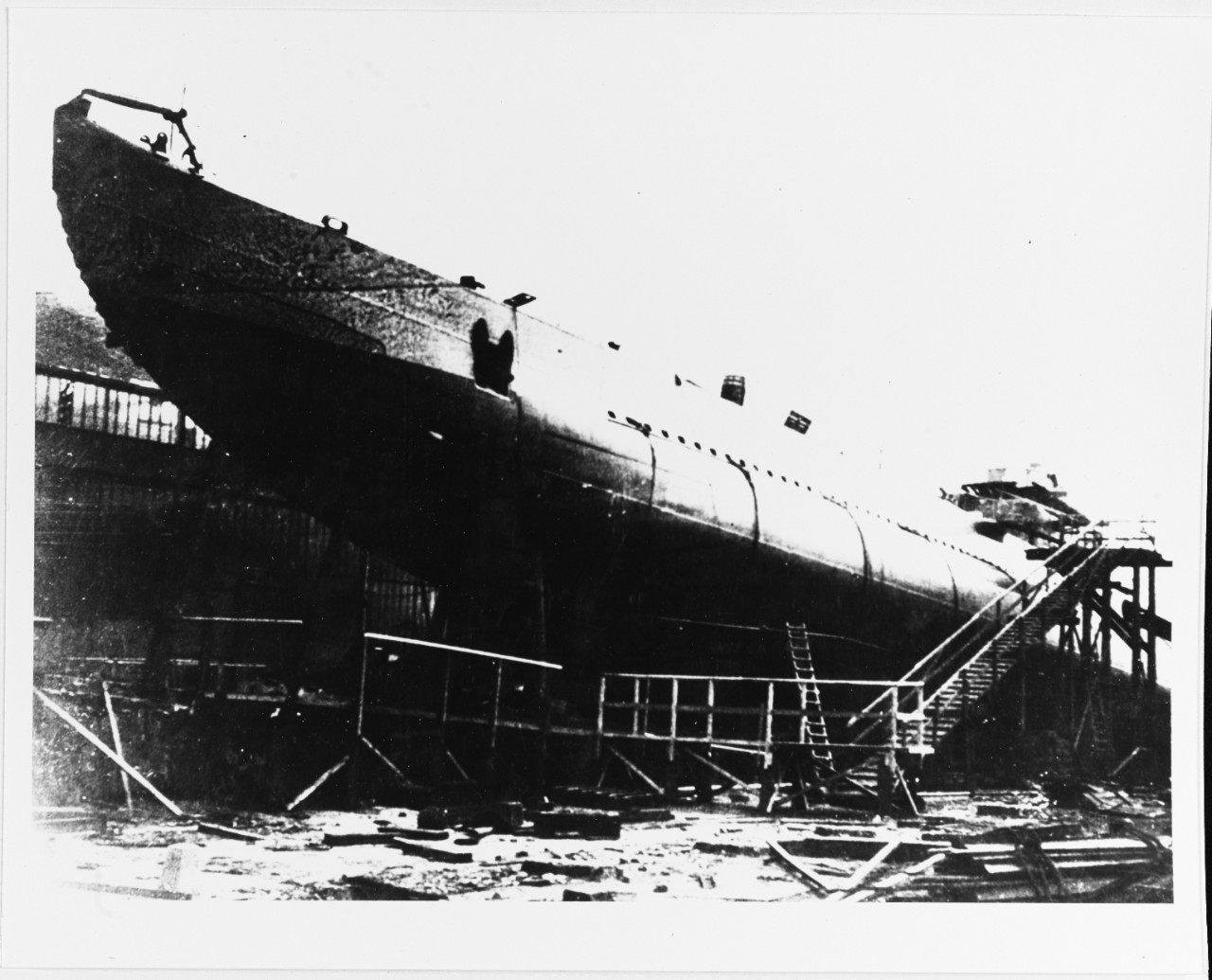
The French Navy submarine Le Conquérant under construction at Ateliers et Chantiers de Saint-Nazaire Penhoët, sometime between 1930 and 1934.

During the Second World War, the shipyard and surrounding facilities were heavily bombed. On 9 November 1942, the apprentice school was struck, resulting in the deaths of 134 apprentices aged 14–17.

=== Merger and successor (1955–present) ===
In 1955, the company merged with the Ateliers et Chantiers de la Loire to form Chantiers de l’Atlantique. The successor company later became STX France in 2008 and reverted to the name Chantiers de l’Atlantique in 2018.

=== Corporate name timeline ===
1861–1866 — Chantiers Scott (Scott‑operated yard under CGT)

1867–1871 — Managed by Compagnie des Chantiers et Ateliers de l’Océan

1869–1870 — Chantiers de l’Océan (revival attempt)

1881–1900 — Chantiers et Ateliers de Penhoët

1900–1955 — Société des Chantiers et Ateliers de Saint‑Nazaire–Penhoët

1955–present — Successor: Chantiers de l’Atlantique

== Shipyards of Ateliers et Chantiers de Saint-Nazaire Penhoët ==
=== Shipyards ===
Ateliers et Chantiers de Penhoët operated a small network of shipyards and associated industrial sites during its history. These facilities had distinct roles and capacities, and together they formed the company’s wider industrial base. Listing them clearly helps distinguish the shipbuilding company from the physical yards where construction took place.

==== Penhoët yard (Saint‑Nazaire) ====
The original yard, founded in 1861 on the east bank of the Loire estuary, was the company’s principal site. It developed from a modest slipway into a major industrial complex with multiple slipways, workshops, boiler shops, and later fitting‑out basins. Most of the company’s major merchant ships and naval vessels were built here, including early steamships, interwar naval contracts, and post‑war reconstruction work. The yard’s location near deep water made it suitable for increasingly large hulls.

==== Grand‑Quevilly yard (near Rouen) ====
Operated intermittently in the late 19th and early 20th centuries as an auxiliary construction site. It handled smaller or secondary projects, including steel sailing ships and hulls intended for fitting‑out elsewhere. One documented vessel built here was the four‑masted barque André Théodore (1902). The yard’s activity rose and fell with fluctuations in demand, and it never matched the scale of the Saint‑Nazaire facilities.

==== Trignac steelworks (Forges de Trignac) ====
Although not a shipyard, this industrial complex was closely linked to Penhoët. Built in the 1890s, it supplied steel plates, forgings, and heavy components used in ship construction. Its proximity to Saint‑Nazaire made it an important part of the company’s industrial ecosystem, even though it operated under separate management. The site’s blast furnaces and rolling mills supported both Penhoët and other regional industries.

==== Saint‑Nazaire fitting‑out basin ====
As vessels grew in size during the late 19th and early 20th centuries, Penhoët expanded its fitting‑out capacity. The basin handled machinery installation, interior work, armament fitting for naval vessels, and final preparations for sea trials. It became increasingly important as the yard shifted toward larger and more complex ships.

Together, these facilities formed a distributed industrial system that supported Penhoët’s evolution from a regional yard into one of France’s major shipbuilding companies.

== Ships built at Penhoët ==
=== Early Scott yard (1861–1866) ===
For the Compagnie Générale Transatlantique:

- France (1864)
- Impératrice Eugénie (1864)
- New World (1865)
- Panama (1866),
- Saint Laurent (1866) modified on the hold into a propeller ship.

=== Penhoët (1881–1900) ===
Primarily passenger liners for CGT (French page lists Île‑de‑France and Normandie as emblematic products of the Penhoët tradition, though built later under the successor entity).

- La Bretagne (1885), Ocean liner
- La Touraine (1890), Ocean liner
- La Navarre (1892), Ocean liner
- La Savoie (1900), Ocean liner.

=== Saint‑Nazaire-Penhoët (1900–1955) ===
Notable vessels include:

- Ariane (1948) Oil tanker for la Compagnie auxiliaire de navigation,
- Crillon 3 square masts (1902) for the Compagnie Maritime Française,
- Dalila (1952) Oil tanker for la Compagnie auxiliaire de navigation.
- Daniel 3 square masts (1902) for the Société des Voiliers Nazairiens,
- France (1910), Ocean liner
- Jean Bart (1940), Battleship
- Joffre, aircraft carrier, started in this yard in 1938, but it was never finished following the outbreak of the Second World War.
- Île de France (1926), Ocean liner
- L'Atlantique (1930), Ocean liner
- La Provence (1905), Ocean liner
- Le Conquérant (Q171), French Navy submarine launched in 1934
- Normandie (1932, Ocean liner
- Paris (1916), Ocean liner
- Vercingetorix 3 square masts (1902) for the Compagnie Française de Navigation.

At Grand-Quevilly:

- André Théodore (1902)

== Bibliography ==
- Jordan, John & Moulin, Jean (2015). French Destroyers: Torpilleurs d'Escadre & Contre-Torpilleurs 1922–1956. Barnsley, UK: Seaforth Publishing. ISBN 978-1-84832-198-4.
- de Saint Hubert, C. (1986). "Builders, Enginebuilders, and Designers of Armored Vessels Built in France 1855–1940". F.P.D.S. Newsletter. XIV (3): 2–8.
