= French destroyer Le Malin =

French Navy's Le Fantasque-class destroyer

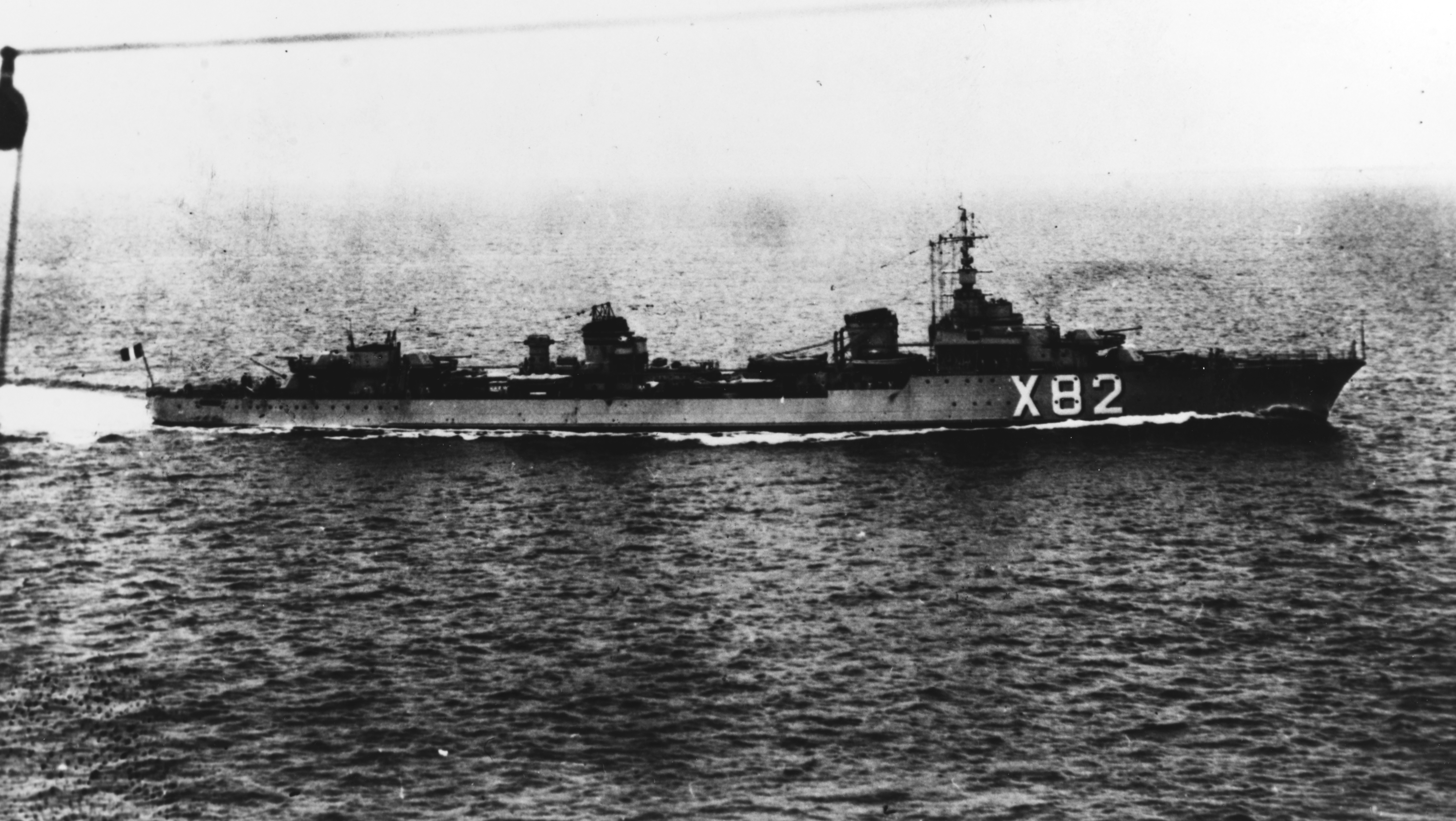
- Le Malin underway, circa 1940

History

France
- Name: Le Malin
- Namesake: “the devil”
- Ordered: 23 May 1931
- Builder: Forges et Chantiers de la Méditerranée, La Seyne-sur-Mer
- Laid down: 16 November 1931
- Launched: 17 August 1933
- Completed: 1 May 1936
- Commissioned: 20 December 1935
- In service: 8 June 1936
- Reclassified: As a light cruiser, 28 September 1943
- Stricken: 3 February 1964
- Fate: Scrapped, 1977

General characteristics (as built)
- Class & type: Le Fantasque-class destroyer
- Displacement: 2,569 t (2,528 long tons) (standard); 3,417 t (3,363 long tons) (deep load)
- Length: 132.4 m (434 ft 5 in)
- Beam: 12 m (39 ft 4 in)
- Draft: 4.5 m (14 ft 9 in)
- Installed power: 4 water-tube boilers; 74,000 PS (54,000 kW; 73,000 shp)
- Propulsion: 2 shafts; 2 geared steam turbines
- Speed: 37 knots (69 km/h; 43 mph) (designed)
- Range: 2,900 nmi (5,400 km; 3,300 mi) at 15 knots (28 km/h; 17 mph)
- Complement: 11 officers, 254 sailors (wartime)
- Armament: 5 × single 138.6 mm (5.5 in) guns; 2 × single 37 mm (1.5 in) AA guns; 2 × twin 13.2 mm (0.52 in) AA machine guns; 3 × triple 550 mm (21.7 in) torpedo tubes; 2 × chutes for 28 depth charges; 40 × mines

Le Malin ("The evil one / The clever one / The Devil") was one of six Le Fantasque-class large destroyers (contre-torpilleur, "Torpedo-boat destroyer") built for the Marine Nationale (French Navy) during the 1930s. The ship entered service in 1935 and participated in the Second World War. When war was declared in September 1939, all of the Le Fantasques were assigned to the Force de Raid, tasked with hunting down German commerce raiders and blockade runners. Le Malin and two of her sister ships were based in Dakar, French West Africa, to patrol the Central Atlantic for several months in late 1939. They returned to Metropolitan France before the end of the year and were transferred to French Algeria in late April 1940 in case Italy decided to enter the war. Le Malin played a minor role in the Norwegian Campaign in late April. After returning to the Mediterranean, she screened French cruisers several times as they unsuccessfully hunted for Italian ships after Italy declared war in June.

After most of French Equatorial Africa had declared for Free France in August, Le Malin and two of her sisters escorted a force of cruisers sent to Dakar in September to intimidate the colonies into rejoining Vichy France. The British and Free French sent a force to persuade French West Africa to join the Free French and the Battle of Dakar began when the garrison rejected their entreaties. The destroyers were given a defensive role, laying a smoke screen to protect the cruisers as they engaged the British ships. Le Malin was refitting in Casablanca, French Morocco, when the Allies invaded French North Africa in late 1942. Badly damaged during the attack and captured afterwards, the ship required temporary repairs before she was sent to the United States for permanent repairs and modernization in mid-1943. She returned to the Mediterranean at the beginning of 1944 where she spent the rest of the year searching for Axis shipping with two of her sisters. In between raids, the ship provided naval gunfire support during Operation Dragoon, the invasion of Southern France in mid-1944. Le Malin had her bow severed during a collision in December and repairs took almost a year to complete.

The ship was only intermittently active for the rest of the 1940s, but was modernized to serve as an escort for French aircraft carriers in 1951. She accompanied one of them to French Indochina to provide support for the French forces there before returning in mid-1952 and was reduced to reserve upon her return. After many years in secondary roles, Le Malin was stricken in 1964 and became a floating breakwater before her hulk was finally scrapped in 1977.

== Design and description ==
The Le Fantasque-class ships were designed to counter the fast Italian Condottieri-class light cruisers with one member of the class, Le Terrible, exceeding 45 knots (83 km/h; 52 mph) during trials to set a world record for a conventionally hulled ship. They had an overall length of 132.4 meters (434 ft 5 in), a beam of 12 meters (39 ft 4 in), and a draft of 4.5 meters (14 ft 9 in). The ships displaced 2,569 metric tons (2,528 long tons) at standard and 3,417 metric tons (3,363 long tons) at deep load. Le Malin was powered by two Parsons geared steam turbines, each driving one propeller shaft, using steam provided by four water-tube boilers. The turbines were designed to produce 74,000 metric horsepower (54,000 kW; 73,000 shp), which would propel the ship at 37 knots (69 km/h; 43 mph). During her sea trials on 28 August 1935, her turbines provided 97,956 metric horsepower (72,047 kW; 96,616 shp) and she reached 42.3 knots (78.3 km/h; 48.7 mph) for a single hour. Le Malin carried enough fuel oil to give her a range of 2,900 nautical miles (5,400 km; 3,300 mi) at 15 knots (28 km/h; 17 mph). The crew of the Le Fantasque class consisted of 11 officers and 221 crewmen in peacetime with the number of the latter increasing to 254 in wartime.

The main armament of the Le Fantasques consisted of five Canon de 138.6 mm (5.5 in) Modèle 1929 guns in single mounts, one superfiring pair fore and aft of the superstructure and the fifth gun abaft the aft funnel. Their anti-aircraft (AA) armament consisted of two Canon de 37 mm (1.5 in) Modèle 1925 guns in single mounts positioned amidships and four Hotchkiss Mitrailleuse de 13.2 mm (0.52 in) CA Modèle 1929 machine guns in two twin-gun mounts aft of the 37 mm mounts. The ships carried three above-water triple sets of 550-millimeter (21.7 in) torpedo tubes; the aft mount could traverse to both sides, but the forward mounts were positioned one on each broadside. A pair of depth charge chutes were built into their stern; these housed a total of sixteen 200-kilogram (440 lb) depth charges with another dozen available in the torpedo magazine. They could also be fitted with rails capable of handling 40 naval mines.

=== Modifications ===
In April 1939, the bridge wings were enlarged to accommodate the Hotchkiss machine guns on Le Malin. After the war began in September, 200 kg depth-charge stowage increased to 48 and a pair of rails were installed on the stern for 35-kilogram (77 lb) depth charges. Each rail could accommodate 3 depth charges and 15 more were stored in the magazine. In early 1940 twin-gun 37 mm mounts replaced the single-gun mounts. Before the ship sailed to Dakar in September, a single Browning 13.2-millimeter anti-aircraft machine gun was installed on top of the aft ammunitions hoists; a second gun was added in the same location in February 1941. Later that year or in 1942, the Hotchkiss machine guns were transferred to new platforms on the center superstructure and their former positions were occupied by the Brownings. During her 1942 refit in Casablanca, Le Malin had the aft superstructure remodeled to create a platform atop the aft ammunition hoists and platforms on each side for 37 mm guns. The twin-gun mounts was repositioned on the upper platform and one of the lower platforms while the other one was occupied by a single mount as there was a shortage of twin-gun mounts. In May the ship was provided with an Alpha-2 sonar system in cases pending the modification of the hull to accommodate the required flexible underwater dome.

== Construction and career ==
Ordered on 23 May 1931 as part of the 1930 Naval Program, Le Malin was laid down by Forges et Chantiers de la Méditerranée at their shipyard in La Seyne-sur-Mer on 16 November 1931. She was launched on 17 August 1933, commissioned on 20 December 1935, completed on 1 May 1936 and entered service on 8 June. Completion was delayed when her turbines stripped some of their blades and required lengthy repairs. When the Le Fantasques entered service they were assigned to the newly formed 8th and 10th Light Divisions (Division légère) which were later redesignated as scout divisions (Division de contre-torpilleurs); both divisions were assigned to the 2nd Light Squadron (2eme Escadre légère in Brest. As of 1 October 1936 Le Malin, Le Triomphant and French destroyer L'Indomptable were assigned to the 8th Light Division while Le Fantasque, Le Terrible and L'Audacieux belonged to the 10th. Between 15 January and 26 February 1937, the 2nd Light Squadron cruised as far south as Conakry, French West Africa. On 27 May, Alphonse Gasnier-Duparc, Minister of the Navy, reviewed the fleet, including the Le Fantasques.

=== World War II ===
Both the 8th and 10th Scout Divisions were assigned to the Force de Raid when war was declared in September 1939; it made only a single sortie as a complete unit on 2–6 September when it responded to an erroneous report that German ships had left port. Afterwards it was dispersed into smaller groups to search for German commerce raiders and blockade runners. During 21–30 October, the Force de Raid, including the Le Fantasques, screened Convoy KJ 4 against a possible attack by the heavy cruiser Admiral Graf Spee. On 25 November the 8th Scout Division, which consisted of Le Malin, L'Indomptable, and Le Triomphant, rendezvoused with the battleship Strasbourg and escorted her to Brest.

In anticipation of an Italian declaration of war, the Force de Raid, including the 8th Scout Division, assembled in Mers-el-Kébir, French Algeria, on 5–9 April 1940, only to return to Brest when the Germans invaded Norway on the 10th. On the night of 23/24 April 1940, the 8th Scout Division made a high-speed patrol of the Skagerrak (Operation Rake), hoping to attack German merchantmen headed for Norway. They encountered two patrol boats and damaged one of them while also engaging a pair of S-boats to little effect and narrowly missed spotting a convoy of minelayers. Le Malin then began having engine problems and the ships were forced to reduce speed. Near-misses by German bombers damaged one of Le Triomphant's propeller shafts as they withdrew. Le Malin and L'Indomptable returned to Mers-el-Kébir on 9 May, but transferred shortly afterwards to nearby Algiers. She took part in a sortie by the Force de Raid into the Western Mediterranean on 12–13 June, after Italy declared war on the Allies on the 10th. Le Malin then began escorting convoys evacuating personnel from mainland France to French North Africa. and escorted cruisers fruitlessly searching for Italian cruisers on 23–24 June after an erroneous report that they were at sea. After the British attack on Mers-el-Kébir on 3 July, the ship escorted the Algiers-based cruisers that failed to rendezvous with Strasbourg after she escaped from Mers-el-Kébir and later arrived at Toulon.

By the end of August, all of French Equatorial Africa had joined Free France, with the exception of French Gabon. In response, the Germans and Italians authorized the Vichy French to send ships to the Gulf of Guinea to bring the rebellious colonies back under control. The 4th Cruiser Division (4eme Division de croiseurs) of three light cruisers, escorted by the 10th Scout Division, was chosen and the ships were designated as Force Y. They departed Toulon on 9 September and departed Casablanca, French Morocco, on the 12th after refueling. The destroyers lacked enough range to reach Dakar at the 24 knots (44 km/h; 28 mph) ordered by Contre amiral (Rear Admiral) Célestin Bourragué and were forced to return to Casablanca. Le Malin and L'Audacieux finally reached Dakar on 20 September. A powerful British and Free French force was already en route to Dakar; their mission was to rally it to the Free French or to conquer it. The Vichy French garrison refused General Charles de Gaulle's appeal to join the Free French on the 23rd and opened fire on the British ships. The Vichy French destroyers were tasked to make a continuous smoke screen to protect the cruisers as they maneuvered to avoid British shells; Le Malin was not damaged during the battle. She began a refit at Casablanca on 13 July 1942, the refit was almost complete when the Allies invaded Morocco on 8 November.

=== Free French operations ===
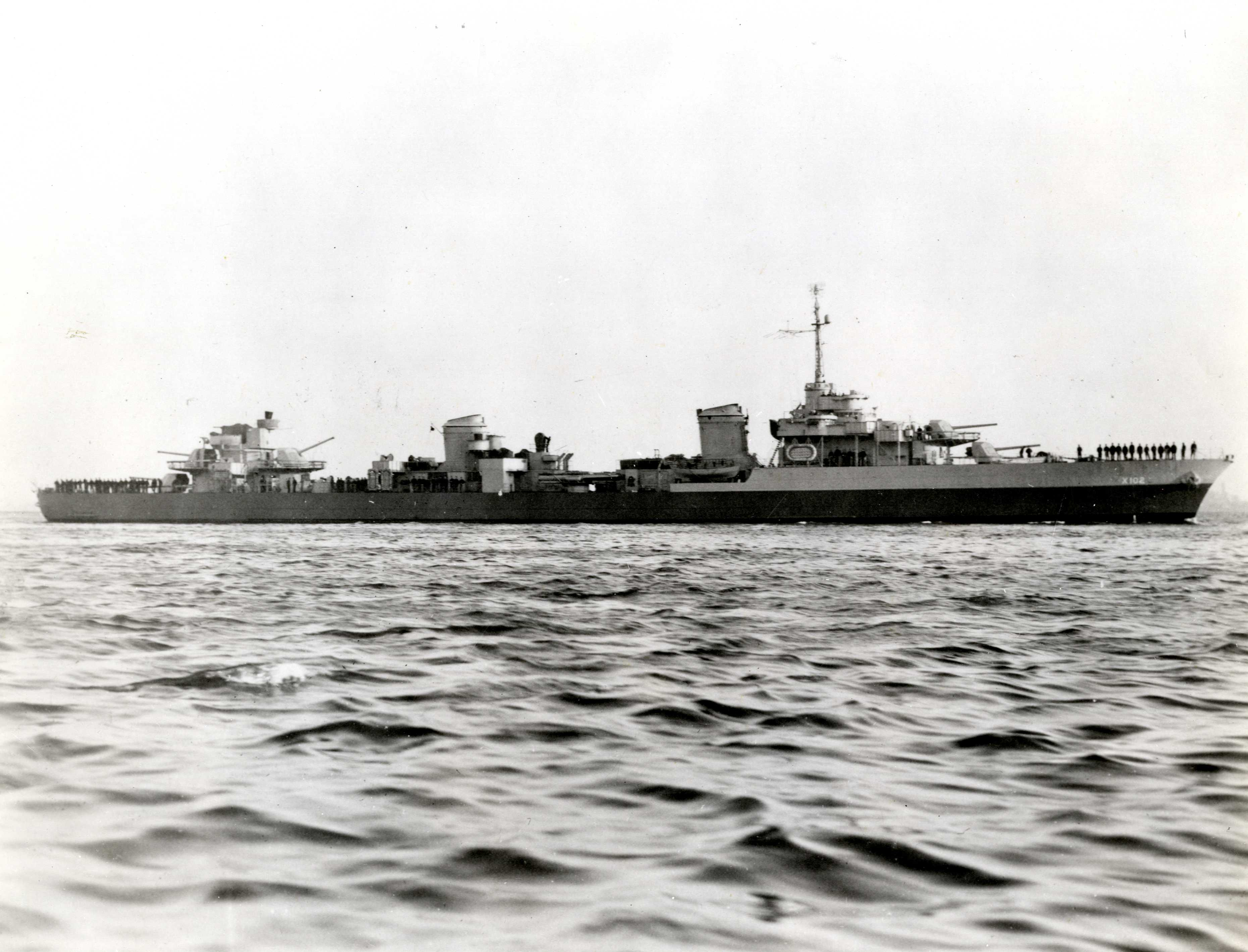
Le Malin or her sister ship Le Triomphant at sea after her overhaul in Boston

The ship was not struck when they bombarded the port, but a ricocheting 16-inch (406 mm) shell fired by the battleship USS Massachusetts struck the jetty against which Le Malin was berthed. Detonating between the two, it tore a large hole in her hull, disabled Boiler No. 3 and killed seven men. The forward engine and boiler rooms flooded and gave her a large list to port. After the Americans captured the port, they turned over all of the ships to the Free French. The limited facilities at the port were overwhelmed and the ship received temporary repairs; only able to use one turbine, she was limited to a speed of 12 knots (22 km/h; 14 mph) when she departed for Charlestown Navy Yard in Boston, Massachusetts, to be modernized. Arriving on 26 June, Le Malin's refit lasted until 17 November and included the addition of a British Type 128 ASDIC system, installation of SA early-warning and SF surface-search radars, the removal of her aft torpedo tubes and the conversion of some boiler feedwater tanks to fuel oil to improve her range. Her AA armament had been removed in Casablanca and now consisted of eight 40-millimeter (1.6 in) Bofors guns in a quadruple mount superfiring over the aft 138.6 mm guns, and two twin mounts forward of the aft funnel; ten 20-millimeter (0.8 in) Oerlikon guns were also added in single mounts, four on the sides of the bridge and the remaining guns on platforms on the aft superstructure and where the torpedo mount had been. Unlike Le Terrible and Le Fantasque, Le Malin received four depth charge throwers abreast the aft superstructure. After the refit, she was reclassified as a light cruiser and the 10th Scout Division was redesignated as the 10th Light Cruiser Division (Division de croiseurs légers). Despite the modernization work in Boston, the ships' turbines were prone to frequent breakdowns during heavy use and required a lot of maintenance. To compensate, the French adopted a policy of keeping two of the three ships in the 10th Light Cruiser Division (LCD) operational at any one time while the third ship was repaired.

Leaving the United States on 19 December, Le Malin joined Le Fantasque in the Azores on 31 December and they patrolled in search of blockade runners for several weeks. Le Malin supported the Allied landings at Anzio, Italy, on 22 January before the 10th LCD was tasked to conduct deep raids in the Adriatic in search of German shipping in late February. The first raid on 28–29 February were unsuccessful, but on the night of 29 February/1 March they encountered a heavily escorted cargo ship. Le Malin and Le Fantasque sank the freighter and heavily damaged the torpedo boat TA37 and a corvette in the Battle of Ist. Le Malin did not participate in any of the raids in March. The ships were refitted and then transferred to Alexandria, Egypt, to conduct patrols south of Crete and in the Aegean in April where they had no engagements other than a bombardment of Kos. In June, the ship's port propeller shaft had to be removed; adapting the supporting strut from L'Audacieux proved to be a prolonged procedure as they were not identical. On 15 August, the 10th LCD provided naval gunfire support during Operation Dragoon, the Allied landing in Provence, during which Le Malin fired 80 shells from her main guns. The ship continued to provide fire support as Allied troops advanced on Toulon. On 5 September, she and the destroyer USS Ludlow were unsuccessfully attacked by German Marder mini-submarines; the ships sank three and captured one. Le Malin was among the French ships that entered Toulon on 13 September. During night exercises in December, Le Terrible collided with Le Malin, severing the latter's bow and killed a total of 70 men between the pair. The latter was under repair until 5 November 1945, receiving the bow from her scuttled sister L'Indomptable.

=== Postwar activities ===
After finishing her repairs, the ship conducted several transport missions. On 1 January 1947, the 10th LCD was combined with the 4th Division of Cruisers into the Cruiser Group. During this time only two of the four surviving ships of the class were active at any one time because of a shortage of trained personnel. Le Malin and Le Terrible were active in 1947 and the former began refit at Bizerte, French Tunisia, on 7 November that lasted until October 1948. The ship was placed in reserve on 1 November 1949. All of the Le Fantasque-class ships were reclassified as escort destroyers, 1st class (destroyer-escorteurs de 1re classe) on 1 July 1951. Le Malin was refitted in 1951 to serve as an escort for the French aircraft carriers and attained a speed of 41 knots (76 km/h; 47 mph) during her post-refit trials on 21 August. A week later, the ship accompanied the carrier Arromanches as she departed for French Indochina where they operated from September to May 1952. The pair arrived back in Toulon on 13 June, but Le Malin sailed for Brest 10 days later where she was reduced to reserve on 1 August. The ship was used as a stationary training ship for the Naval Academy École Navale and then as a floating jetty for the minesweeper base at Lannion. She was stricken from the Navy List on 3 February 1964 and then used as a breakwater at Lorient in 1965–1976 before she was broken up in 1977.

== Bibliography ==
- Jordan, John & Moulin, Jean (2015). French Destroyers: Torpilleurs d'Escadre & Contre-Torpilleurs 1922–1956. Barnsley, UK: Seaforth Publishing. ISBN 978-1-84832-198-4.
- Roberts, John (1980). "France". In Chesneau, Roger (ed.). Conway's All the World's Fighting Ships 1922–1946. New York: Mayflower Books. pp. 255–279. ISBN 0-8317-0303-2.
- Rohwer, Jürgen (2005). Chronology of the War at Sea 1939–1945: The Naval History of World War Two (Third Revised ed.). Annapolis, Maryland: Naval Institute Press. ISBN 1-59114-119-2.
