= French ship Fantasque =

Six French ships of the French Navy have borne the name Fantasque ("capricious"):

- Fantasque (1692), a fireship, lead ship of her class
- Fantasque (1758), a Lion-class 64-gun ship of the line
- Fantasque (1761), a Coquette-class gunboat
- Fantasque (1916), an auxiliary patrol boat (ex-Diaz, a Danish whaler)
- Fantasque (1919), a Fanfaron-class patrol boat
- Le Fantasque (1936), a destroyer, lead ship of her class
Ships of the French Navy named Fantasque
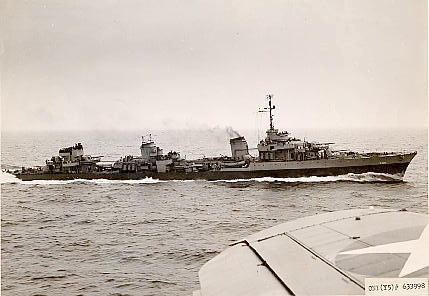
Le Fantasque (1936) during the Second World War

== Bibliography ==
- Roche, Jean-Michel (2005). Dictionnaire des bâtiments de la flotte de guerre française de Colbert à nos jours. Vol. 1. Group Retozel-Maury Millau. p. 192. ISBN 978-2-9525917-0-6. OCLC 165892922.
- Roche, Jean-Michel (2005). Dictionnaire des bâtiments de la flotte de guerre française de Colbert à nos jours. Vol. 2. Group Retozel-Maury Millau. p. 203. ISBN 978-2-9525917-0-6. OCLC 165892922.
