= French destroyer Le Fantasque =

French Navy's Le Fantasque-class destroyer

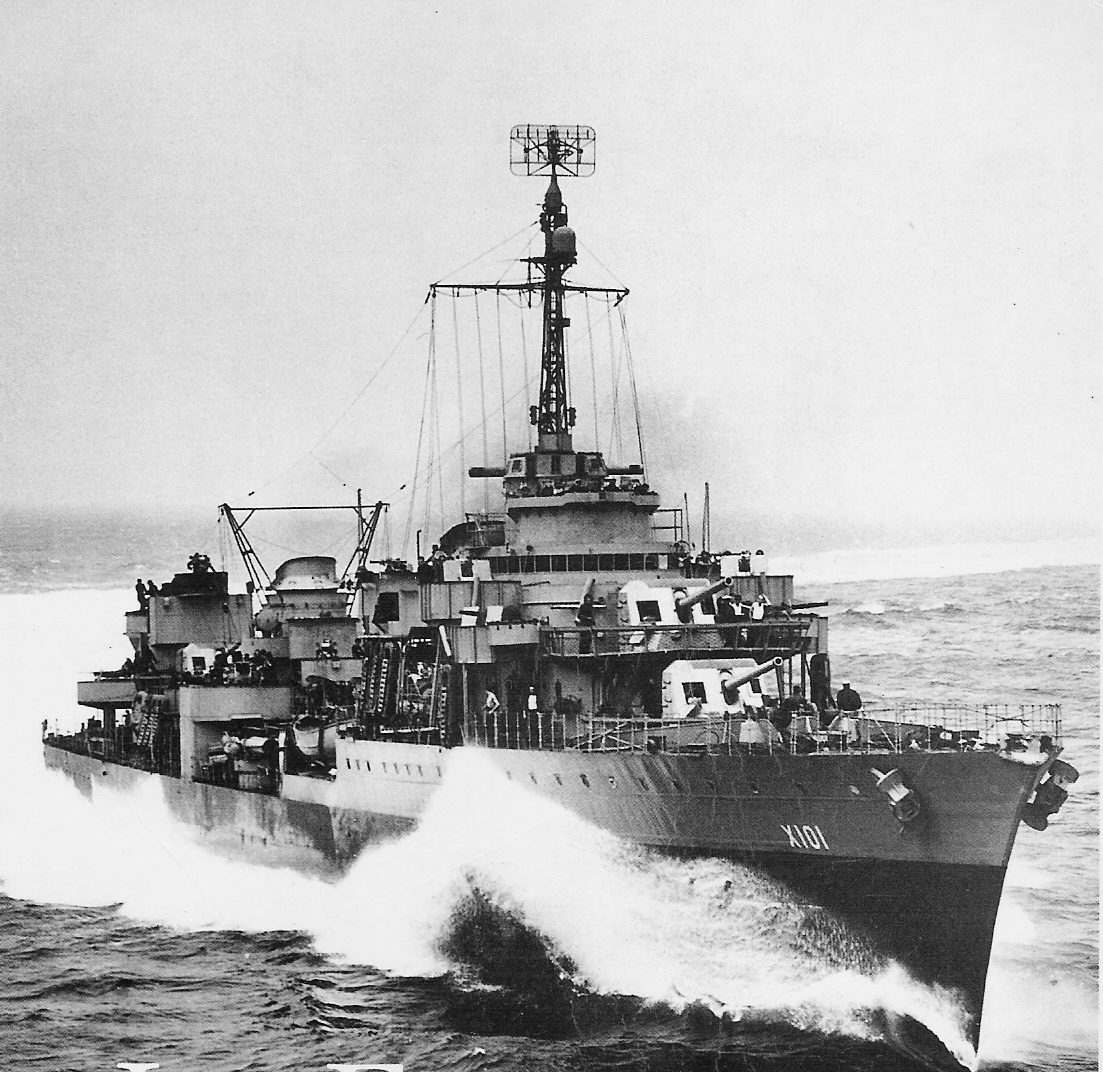
- Le Fantasque at sea, 1943

History

France
- Name: Le Fantasque
- Namesake: "The capricious one"
- Ordered: 17 November 1930
- Builder: Arsenal de Lorient
- Laid down: 16 November 1931
- Launched: 15 March 1934
- Commissioned: 15 November 1935
- Decommissioned: August 1953
- In service: 1 May 1936
- Reclassified: as a light cruiser, 28 September 1943
- Stricken: 1953
- Fate: Scrapped, 1958

General characteristics (as built)
- Class & type: Le Fantasque-class destroyer
- Displacement: 2,569 t (2,528 long tons) (standard); 3,417 t (3,363 long tons) (deep load)
- Length: 132.4 m (434 ft 5 in)
- Beam: 12 m (39 ft 4 in)
- Draft: 4.5 m (14 ft 9 in)
- Installed power: 4 water-tube boilers; 74,000 PS (54,000 kW; 73,000 shp)
- Propulsion: 2 shafts; 2 geared steam turbines
- Speed: 37 knots (69 km/h; 43 mph) (designed)
- Range: 2,900 nmi (5,400 km; 3,300 mi) at 15 knots (28 km/h; 17 mph)
- Complement: 11 officers, 254 sailors (wartime)
- Armament: 5 × single 138.6 mm (5.5 in) guns; 2 × single 37 mm (1.5 in) AA guns; 2 × twin 13.2 mm (0.52 in) AA machine guns; 3 × triple 550 mm (21.7 in) torpedo tubes; 2 × chutes for 28 depth charges; 40 × mines

Le Fantasque (French pronunciation: [lə fɑ̃task]; "The capricious one") was the lead ship of her class of six large destroyers (contre-torpilleur, "Torpedo-boat destroyer") built for the Marine Nationale (French Navy) during the 1930s. The ship entered service in 1935 and participated in the Second World War. When war was declared in September 1939, all of the Le Fantasques were assigned to the Force de Raid which was tasked to hunt down German commerce raiders and blockade runners. Le Fantasque and two of her sister ships were based in Dakar, French West Africa, to patrol the Central Atlantic for several months in late 1939. They returned to Metropolitan France before the end of the year and were transferred to French Algeria in late April 1940 in case Italy decided to enter the war. She screened French cruisers several times as they unsuccessfully hunted for Italian ships after Italy declared war in June.

After most of French Equatorial Africa had declared for Free France in August, Le Fantasque and two of her sisters escorted a force of cruisers sent to Dakar in September to intimidate the colonies into rejoining Vichy France. The British and Free French sent a force to persuade French West Africa to join the Free French and the Battle of Dakar began when the garrison rejected their entreaties. The Vichy destroyers were given a defensive role, laying a smoke screen to protect the cruisers as they engaged the British ships. Le Fantasque was still in Dakar when French West Africa joined the Allies in late 1942. She was then modernized in the United States, in early 1943 and returned to the Mediterranean mid-year where she spent the next year searching for Axis shipping with two of her sisters. In between raids, the ship supported the liberation of Corsica in September and provided naval gunfire support during Operation Dragoon, the invasion of Southern France in mid-1944.

After the war Le Fantasque was sent to French Indochina in late 1945–1946 to provide support for the French forces there. After returning to Metropolitan France in mid-1946, she was intermittently active until mid-1950. Deemed uneconomical to repair at that time, the ship was placed in reserve until she was stricken in 1953. Le Fantasque was scrapped in 1958.

== Design and description ==
The Le Fantasque-class ships were designed to counter the fast Italian Condottieri-class light cruisers and one member of the class, Le Terrible, exceeding 45 knots (83 km/h; 52 mph) during trials to set a world record for a conventionally hulled ship. They had an overall length of 132.4 meters (434 ft 5 in), a beam of 12 meters (39 ft 4 in), and a draft of 4.5 meters (14 ft 9 in). The ships displaced 2,569 metric tons (2,528 long tons) at standard and 3,417 metric tons (3,363 long tons) at deep load. Le Fantasque was powered by two Rateau-Bretagne geared steam turbines, each driving one propeller shaft, using steam provided by four water-tube boilers. The turbines were designed to produce 74,000 metric horsepower (54,000 kW; 73,000 shp), which would propel the ship at 37 knots (69 km/h; 43 mph). During her sea trials on 11 July 1935, her turbines provided 96,773 metric horsepower (71,176 kW; 95,449 shp) and she reached 41.4 knots (76.7 km/h; 47.6 mph) for a single hour. The ship carried enough fuel oil to give her a range of 2,900 nautical miles (5,400 km; 3,300 mi) at 15 knots (28 km/h; 17 mph). The crew of the Le Fantasque class consisted of 11 officers and 221 crewmen in peacetime and the number of the latter increasing to 254 in wartime.

The main armament of the Le Fantasques consisted of five Canon de 138.6 mm (5.5 in) Modèle 1929 guns in single mounts, one superfiring pair fore and aft of the superstructure and the fifth gun abaft the aft funnel. Their anti-aircraft armament consisted of two Canon de 37 mm (1.5 in) Modèle 1925 guns in single mounts positioned amidships and four Hotchkiss Mitrailleuse de 13.2 mm (0.52 in) CA Modèle 1929 machine guns in two twin-gun mounts aft of the 37 mm mounts. The ships carried three above-water triple sets of 550-millimeter (21.7 in) torpedo tubes; the aft mount could traverse to both sides, but the forward mounts were positioned one on each broadside. A pair of depth charge chutes were built into their stern; these housed a total of sixteen 200-kilogram (440 lb) depth charges with another dozen available in the torpedo magazine. The ship could also be fitted with rails capable of handling 40 naval mines.

=== Modifications ===
In December 1938–January 1939, the bridge wings were enlarged to accommodate the Hotchkiss machine guns on Le Fantasque. After the war began in September, 200 kg depth-charge stowage increased to 48 and a pair of rails were installed on the stern for 35-kilogram (77 lb) depth charges. Each rail could accommodate 3 depth charges and 15 more were stored in the magazine. In early 1940 twin-gun 37 mm mounts replaced the single-gun mounts. Before the ship sailed to Dakar in September, a single Browning 13.2-millimeter anti-aircraft machine gun was installed on top of the aft ammunitions hoists; a second gun was added in the same location in February 1941. Later that year or in 1942, the Hotchkiss machine guns were transferred to new platforms on the center superstructure and their former positions were occupied by the Brownings. During her 1941 refit in Oran, French Algeria, Le Fantasque had her aft superstructure remodeled in early to create a platform atop the aft ammunition hoists and platforms on each side for 37 mm guns. The twin-gun mounts was repositioned on the upper platform and one of the lower platforms while the other one was occupied by a single mount as there was a shortage of twin-gun mounts. In May 1942 the ship was provided with an Alpha-2 sonar system in cases pending the modification of the hull to accommodate the required flexible underwater dome.

== Construction and career ==
Ordered on 17 November 1930 as part of the 1930 Naval Program, Le Fantasque was laid down by the Arsenal de Lorient on 16 November 1931. She was launched on 15 March 1934, commissioned on 15 November 1935, completed on 10 March 1936 and entered service on 1 May. Completion was delayed when the ship ran aground while entering Lorient and badly damaged her keel and propellers. When the Le Fantasques entered service they were assigned to the newly formed 8th and 10th Light Divisions (Division légère) which were later redesignated as scout divisions (Division de contre-torpilleurs); both divisions were assigned to the 2nd Light Squadron (2eme Escadre légère) in Brest. As of 1 October 1936 L'Indomptable, Le Triomphant and Le Malin were assigned to the 8th Light Division while Le Fantasque, Le Terrible and L'Audacieux belonged to the 10th.

Albert Lebrun, President of France, inaugurated the new building of the Naval Academy (École Navale) in Brest and reviewed the 2nd Squadron on 30 May 1936, including Le Fantasque, L'Audacieux, L'Indomptable, and Le Terrible. Between 15 January and 26 February, the 2nd Light Squadron cruised as far south as Conakry, French West Africa. On 27 May 1937, Alphonse Gasnier-Duparc, Minister of the Navy, reviewed the fleet, including all of the Le Fantasques.

=== World War II ===
Both the 8th and 10th Scout Divisions were assigned to the Force de Raid when war was declared in September 1939; it made only a single sortie as a complete unit on 2–6 September when it responded to an erroneous report that German ships had left port. Afterwards it was dispersed into smaller groups to search for German commerce raiders and blockade runners. The 10th Scout Division, together with British ships, was assigned to Force X that was based in Dakar, French West Africa from 10 October to 18 November. During 21–30 October, the Force de Raid, including all of the Le Fantasques, screened Convoy KJ 4 against a possible attack by the heavy cruiser Admiral Graf Spee. On 25 November, together with Le Terrible and the heavy cruiser Dupleix, she captured the 4,627-gross register ton (GRT) German merchantman Santa Fé. The ships of the 10th Scout Division escorted the Strasbourg and the British aircraft carrier Hermes as they searched for German ships in the Central Atlantic during 7–13 November. The division escorted Strasbourg and the heavy cruiser Algérie back to France on 18 November. Le Fantasque took part in a sortie by the Force de Raid into the Western Mediterranean on 12–13 June, after Italy declared war on the Allies on the 10th. Le Fantasque then began escorting convoys evacuating personnel from mainland France to French North Africa and escorted cruisers fruitlessly searching for Italian cruisers on 23–24 June after an erroneous report that they were at sea. After the British attack on Mers-el-Kébir on 3 July, the ship escorted the Algiers-based cruisers that failed to rendezvous with Strasbourg after she escaped from Mers-el-Kébir and later arrived at Toulon.

By the end of August, all of French Equatorial Africa had joined Free France, with the exception of French Gabon. In response, the Germans and Italians authorized the Vichy French to send ships to the Gulf of Guinea to bring the rebellious colonies back under control. The 4th Cruiser Division (4eme Division de croiseurs) of three light cruisers, escorted by the 10th Scout Division, was chosen and the ships were designated as Force Y. They departed Toulon on 9 September and departed Casablanca, French Morocco, on the 12th after refueling. The destroyers lacked enough range to reach Dakar at the 24 knots (44 km/h; 28 mph) ordered by Contre amiral (Rear Admiral) Bourragué and were forced to return to Casablanca. Le Fantasque, delayed by machinery problems, finally reached Dakar on 20 September, a day after her sisters. A powerful British and Free French force was already en route to Dakar; their mission was to rally it to the Free French or to conquer it. The Vichy French garrison refused General Charles de Gaulle's appeal to join the Free French on the 23rd and opened fire on the British ships. The Vichy destroyers were tasked to make a continuous smoke screen to protect the cruisers as they maneuvered to avoid British shells; Le Fantasque was not damaged during the battle. She was refitted at Oran from 20 July 1941 to 27 January 1942.

=== Allied operations ===
After the Allies invaded French North Africa on 8 November, French West Africa and its fleet, including Le Fantasque and her sister Le Terrible, joined the Allies on 24 November. The sisters steamed to Casablanca, French Morocco, where their light anti-aircraft guns were removed on 21 January 1943 and then to the Charlestown Navy Yard in Boston to be modernized. Arriving on 21 February, Le Fantasque's refit lasted until 25 June and included the addition of a British Type 128D ASDIC system, installation of SA early-warning and SF surface search radars, the removal of her aft torpedo tubes and the conversion of some boiler feedwater tanks to fuel oil to improve her range. Her AA armament now consisted of eight 40 mm (1.6 in) Bofors guns in a quadruple mount superfiring over the aft 138.6 mm guns, and two twin mounts forward of the aft funnel; eight 20 mm (0.8 in) Oerlikon guns were also added in single mounts, four on the sides of the bridge and the remaining guns on platforms on the aft superstructure. These changes added about 410 tonnes (404 long tons) to her displacement; during speed trials on 12 June, the ship reached 39.5 knots (73.2 km/h; 45.5 mph). After the refit, she was reclassified as a light cruiser and the 10th Scout Division was redesignated as the 10th Light Cruiser Division (Division de croiseurs légers). Despite the modernization work in Boston, the ships' turbines were prone to frequent breakdowns during heavy use and required a lot of maintenance. To compensate, the French adopted a policy of keeping two of the three ships in the 10th Light Cruiser Division (LCD) operational at any one time while the third ship was repaired.

The ship arrived back at Casablanca on 18 July and then in Algiers a week later after which Le Fantasque escorted a few convoys. Together with Le Terrible, she sortied in search of Axis shipping off Scalea, Italy, on 20–21 August, where the ships engaged Italian motor torpedo boats and then in the Bay of Naples on 21–22 August. The sisters were among the escorts for the British Force H during the Salerno landings (Operation Avalanche) on 9 September and helped to shoot down a German aircraft that night. As the Germans began evacuating Corsica on 10 September, the Allies began landing troops. Between the nights of 13/14 and 22/23 September, Le Fantasque helped to landed 3,750 troops at Ajaccio, along with 430 long tons (437 t) of supplies. The ship was lightly damaged when she ran aground at Ajaccio on her last mission. On 17 October Le Fantasque and Le Terrible departed Oran on 17 October to rendezvous with the battleship Richelieu at the Azores and escorted her to Mers-el-Kébir. The following month, the sisters conducted two unsuccessful raids searching for German shipping in the Aegean Sea on 19–24 November in conjunction with the British light cruiser Neptune. On 24 December, she intercepted the German cargo ship Nicoline Maersk and forced the freighter to beach herself to avoid capture. Shortly afterwards the sisters were transferred to the Azores to hunt for German blockade runners (Operation Stonewall). After the Allied victory during the Battle of the Bay of Biscay on the 28th, the sisters sailed to Gibraltar, but only stayed a few days before returning to the Azores to continue their search for blockade runners.

During the Allied landings at Anzio, Italy, on 22 January, Le Fantasque carried out a diversionary bombardment of Civitavecchia and then bombarded Formia and Terracina the following day. In late February the 10th LCD was tasked to conduct deep raids in the Adriatic in search of German shipping. The first two raids on 27–29 February were unsuccessful, but on the night of 29 February/1 March they encountered a heavily escorted cargo ship. Le Fantasque and Le Malin sank the freighter and heavily damaged the torpedo boat TA37 and a corvette in the Battle of Ist. Further sweeps were fruitless although the cruisers bombarded Zante on the night of 7/8 March. On the night of 18/19 March, Le Fantasque and Le Terrible encountered a German convoy and sank two Siebel ferries and damaged two other ferries. Both cruisers were struck by return fire that wounded eight men aboard Le Fantasque and one crewman on Le Terrible. The ships were refitted and then transferred to Alexandria, Egypt, to conduct patrols south of Crete and in the Aegean in April where they had no engagements other than a bombardment of Kos. Transferred back to the Adriatic in June, Le Fantasque and Le Terrible sank the small oil tanker SS Giuliana on the 17th. During the last raid on the night of 24/25, Le Fantasque's port propeller shaft began vibrating which limited her to a speed of 25 knots (46 km/h; 29 mph). On 15 August, the 10th LCD provided naval gunfire support during Operation Dragoon, the Allied landing in Provence, Le Fantasque firing 280 shells from her main guns. Together with Le Terrible, Le Fantasque escorted Richelieu to Toulon on 1 October.

=== Postwar activities ===
Le Fantasque arrived in Saigon, French Indochina, on 27 October 1945 and alternated with Le Triomphant in providing gunfire support to the French garrison at Nha Trang and then supporting French forces on the coast of the Gulf of Tonkin. The sisters participated in a naval review in Ha Long Bay on 24 March 1946. Le Fantasque then made a show the flag cruise to Japan in May–June and departed Saigon for Metropolitan France on 4 July. On 1 January 1947, the 10th LCD was combined with the 4th Division of Cruisers into the Cruiser Group; during this time, only two of the four surviving ships of the class were active at any one time because of a shortage of trained personnel. Le Fantasque was active in March–September before beginning a major refit that lasted until May 1948. She was recommissioned on 12 July and remained on active duty until decommissioned in August 1950. The ship was supposed to begin a refit in Bizerte, French Tunisia, but this was canceled because her condition was too poor and she was placed in the reserve. All of the Le Fantasque-class ships were reclassified as escort destroyers, 1st class (destroyer-escorteurs de 1re classe) on 1 July 1951 and then as fast escorts (escorteur rapide) in 1953. Le Fantasque was towed to Saint-Mandrier-sur-Mer in September 1953, stricken from the Navy List that year and scrapped in 1958.
