= SS Santa Fé (1921) =

German refrigerated cargo ship, sunk in 1943

Coordinates: 45°05′N 33°16′E

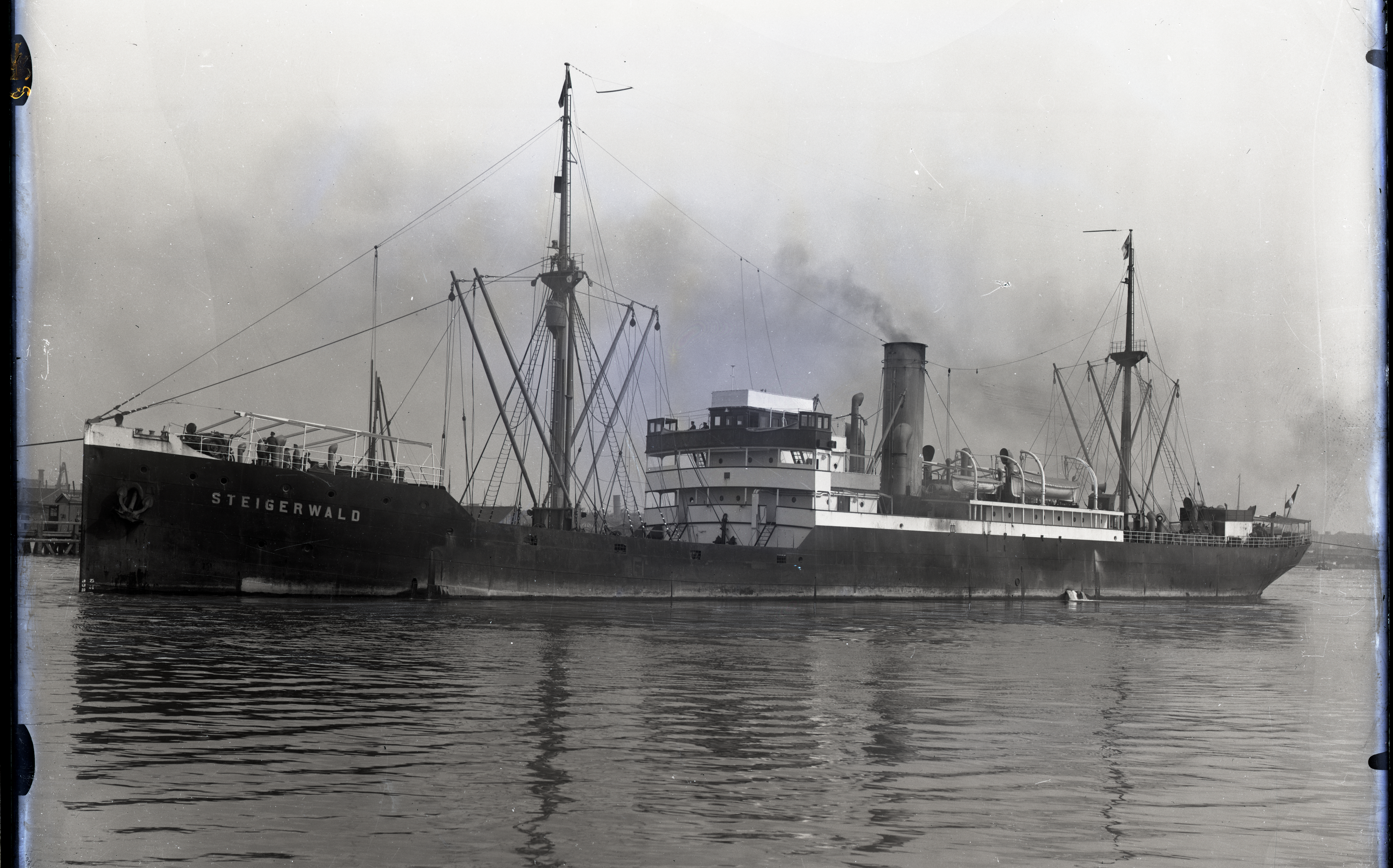
- Steigerwald, probably in Antwerp

History
- Name: Steigerwald (1921–37); Santa Fé (1937–39, 40 or 42–43); Saint André (1939–40 or 42)
- Namesake: Steigerwald (1921–37); Andrew the Apostle (1939–40 or 42)
- Owner: Hamburg America Line (1921–37); Hamburg Süd (1937–39); French Government (1939–40 or 42); German Government (1940 or 42–43)
- Operator: Hamburg America Line (1921–37); Hamburg Süd (1937–39); Mittelmeer-Reederei (1943)
- Port of registry: Hamburg (1921–39); Marseille (1939–40 or 42)
- Builder: Deutsche Werft, Hamburg
- Yard number: 34
- Launched: 14 May 1921
- Completed: 29 July 1921
- Identification: code letters RBMG (1921–33); call sign DHWF (1934–39, 1940 or 42–43)
- Captured: by French Navy, 3 Oct 1939
- Fate: Sunk by torpedo, 23 Nov 1943

General characteristics
- Type: refrigerated cargo ship
- Tonnage: as built: 4,535 GRT, 2,786 NRT; 1933 onward: 4,627 GRT, 2,754 NRT
- Length: 390.0 ft (118.9 m)
- Beam: 50.2 ft (15.3 m)
- Depth: 24.9 ft (7.6 m)
- Decks: 2
- Installed power: as built: 3-cylinder triple-expansion engine; 337 NHP; 1934 onward: as above, plus exhaust steam turbine; 438 NHP
- Propulsion: 1 × screw
- Speed: as built: 10.5 knots (19.4 km/h); by 1934: 12 knots (22 km/h)
- Sensors & processing systems: by 1930: wireless direction finding; submarine signalling
- Notes: sister ship: Niederwald

SS Santa Fé was a German refrigerated cargo steamship. She is now a Black Sea shipwreck and part of her cargo is of interest to marine archaeologists.

The ship was launched in 1921 as Steigerwald, named after the Steigerwald forest in Franconia. Her name was changed to Santa Fé when she changed owners in 1937. In 1939 the French Navy captured her and the French Government renamed her Saint André.

In 1940 or 1942 Germany repossessed the ship and restored her name to Santa Fé. In 1943 a Soviet submarine sank her off the coast of Crimea, killing 44 of her crew.

Santa Fé's cargo included 14 Wehrmacht armoured vehicles. Since 2002 divers and salvagers have recovered the remains of three German assault guns from her wreck, and at least one of them has been restored to working order.

== Building ==
In 1920–21 Deutsche Werft in Finkenwerder, Hamburg built a pair of refrigerated cargo steamships for the Hamburg America Line (HAPAG). Niederwald and Steigerwald had consecutive yard numbers: 33 and 34. Niederwald was launched on 29 January 1921 and Steigerwald was launched on 14 May, and made her sea trials on 24 July.

Steigerwald was 390.0 ft (118.9 m) long, her beam was 50.2 ft (15.3 m) and her depth was 24.9 ft (7.6 m). As built her tonnages were 4,535 GRT and 2,786 NRT. She had a Gutehoffnungshütte three-cylinder triple-expansion engine that was rated at 337 NHP and gave her a speed of 10.5 knots (19.4 km/h).

== Peacetime service ==
Steigerwald's maiden voyage was to South America. Thereafter she operated to both South and North America. In 1933 her tonnages were revised to 4,627 GRT and 2,754 NRT.

By 1934 HAPAG had a Bauer-Wach exhaust steam turbine installed alongside Steigerwald's triple-expansion engine. Exhaust steam from the low-pressure cylinder of the triple-expansion engine powered the turbine. The turbine drove the same shaft as the piston engine, via double-reduction gearing and a Föttinger fluid coupling.

The combination of reciprocating and turbine power increased Steigerwald's fuel efficiency. Her total installed power was now rated at 438 NHP, which was an increase of almost 30 percent. The extra power increased her speed to 12 knots (22 km/h).

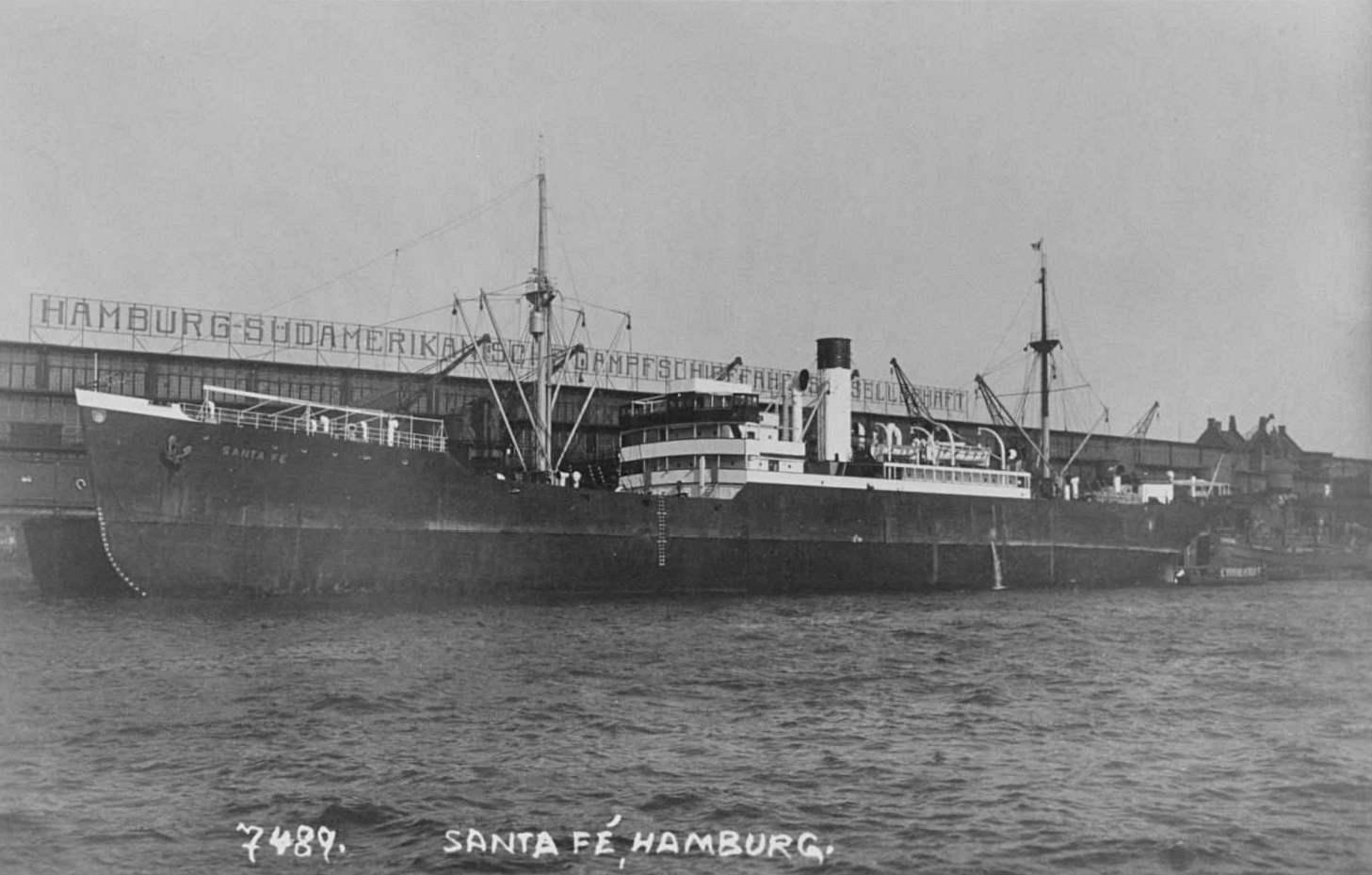
The ship as Santa Fé, during or after 1937

In 1935 HAPAG chartered Steigerwald to Hamburg Südamerikanische DG, which then bought Niederwald in 1936 and Steigerwald in 1937. Hamburg Süd renamed the ships Asuncion and Santa Fé. The pair continued to trade between South America and Germany.

== Second World War ==
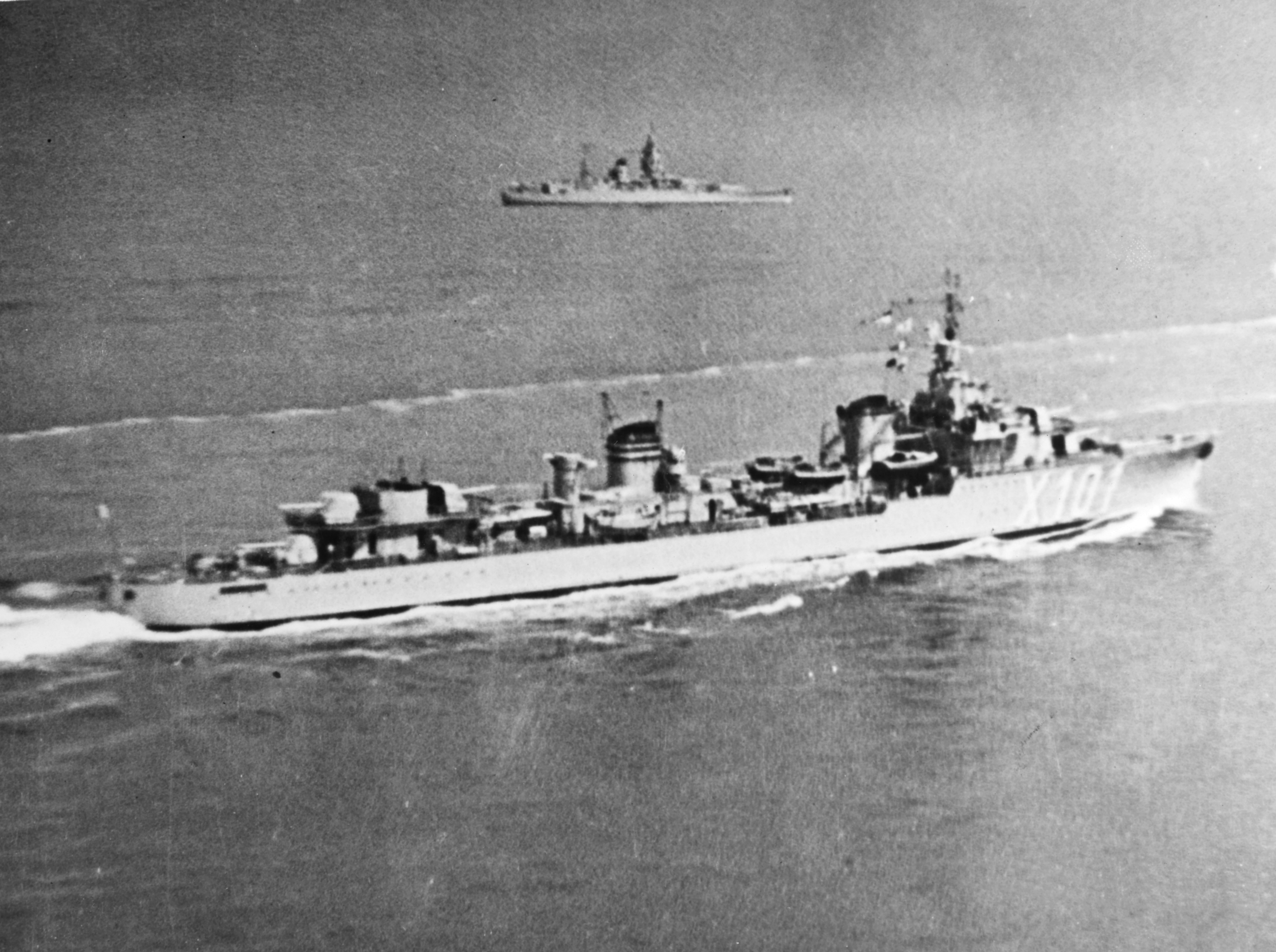
The destroyer Le Fantasque, which with her sister ship Le Terrible captured Santa Fé in 1939.

In October 1939, after the outbreak of the Second World War, Santa Fé was in Rio de Janeiro. She tried to return to Germany but on 25 October the French destroyers Le Terrible and Le Fantasque intercepted her. The French Government took possession of the ship, renamed her Saint André and contracted a merchant shipping company to manage her. Sources disagree as to whether that company was Chargeurs Réunis or Messageries Maritimes.

Saint André sailed in one Allied convoy. Convoy 4 DS left Dakar in Senegal on 25 November 1939 and reached Casablanca in Morocco on 3 December.

In June 1940 France capitulated to Germany and Italy. One source asserts that Saint André was returned to HAPAG in 1940, but another states that she remained in French hands until Germany and Italy occupied Vichy France in November 1942. Either way, by the end of 1942 she had returned to German hands and her name had been reverted to Santa Fé.

By September 1943 the German Government had assigned her management to Mittelmeer-Reederei, a government-controlled company that operated merchant ships in the Mediterranean theatre of the war.

== Loss ==
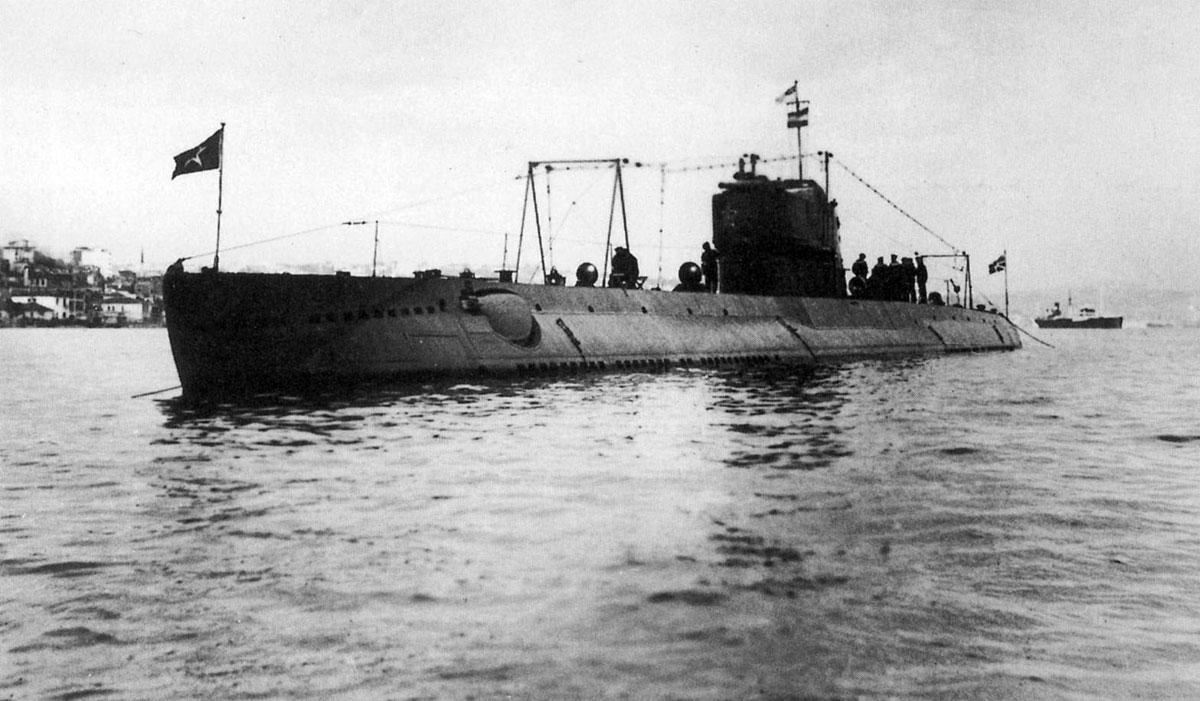
The Soviet submarine D-4 Revolutsioner torpedoed Santa Fé in 1943

On 1 and 3 November 1943 Soviet forces made an amphibious assault on German and Romanian forces occupying Crimea. On 23 November Santa Fé left Constanța in Romania for Sevastopol in Crimea carrying 12 Sturmgeschütz III assault guns, two Jagdpanzers, and 1,278 tons of other matériel including artillery shells, aerial bombs and casks of petrol. Santa Fé was in a convoy called Wotan, escorted by the Royal Romanian Navy destroyer NMS Mărăști, minelayer Amiral Murgescu, three German minesweepers and the German Q-ship Lola.

At 1000 hrs on 23 November the Soviet Dekabrist-class submarine D-4 Revolutsioner torpedoed Santa Fé south of Yevpatoria in Kalamita Bay, causing an explosion in her forward hold followed by a fire. A second explosion broke Santa Fé's hull in two and rapidly sank her. 28 of her crew were listed as killed and 16 were listed as missing.

Revolutsioner was later lost with all hands. The last reported sighting of her was on 1 December. The cause of her loss remains unknown.

On 15 December 1943 the German auxiliary submarine hunter UJ-102 suffered an explosion and sank in Kalamita Bay, killing all 53 of her crew. It is suspected that she mistook Santa Fé's wreck for a Soviet submarine, started depth charging it, and caused part of Santa Fé's cargo to explode.

== Salvaged cargo ==
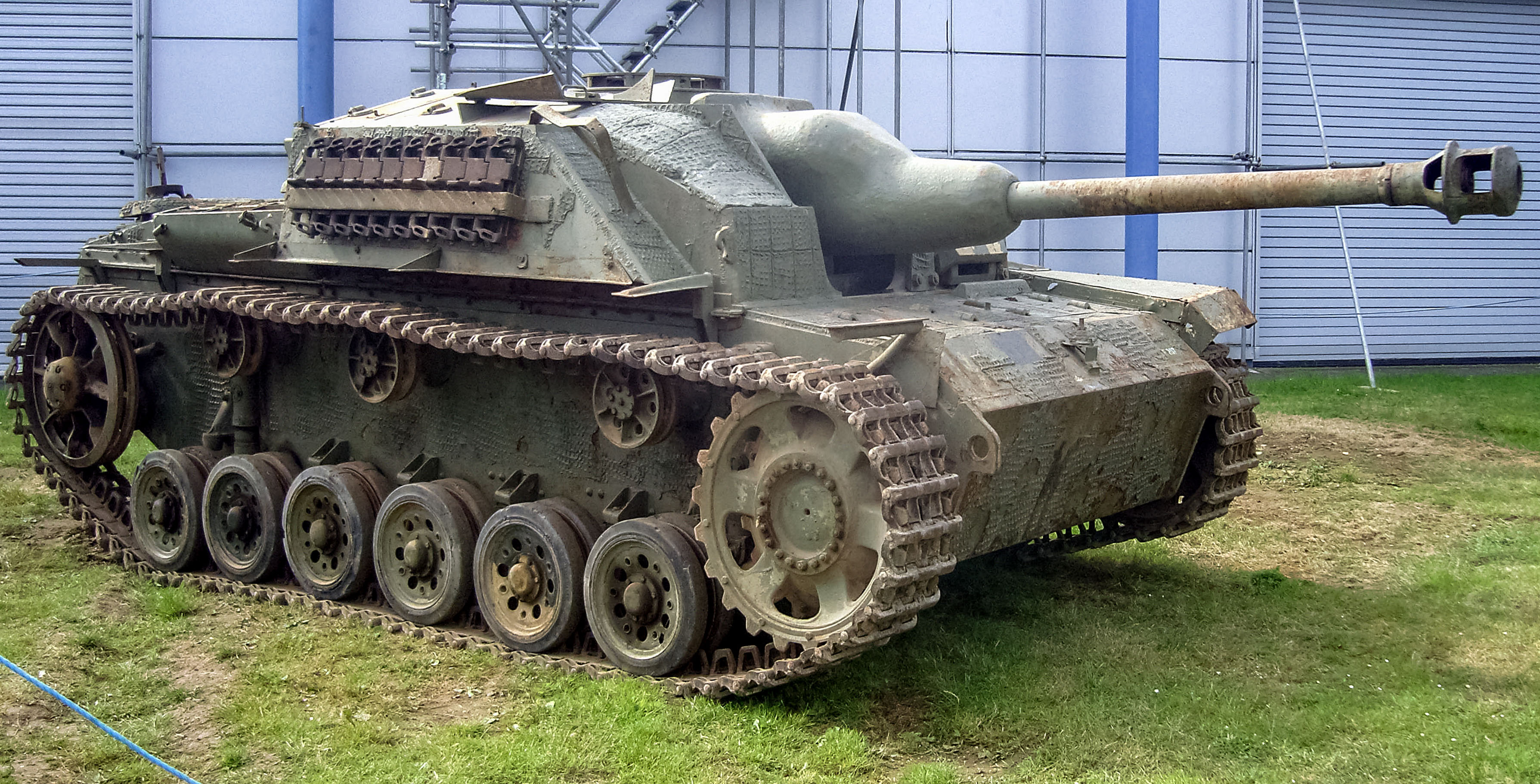
An StuG III Ausf. G assault gun in a museum

Santa Fé's wreck lies at a depth of 10 to 21 metres (33 to 69 ft). Débris covers 300 square metres (3,200 sq ft) of seabed.

In 2002 divers recovered the remains of two Sturmgeschütz III assault guns from the wreck. A UK charity, the Weald Foundation, obtained one of them and has restored it to running order.

In 2017 the Russian Ministry of Defence's Expedition Centre, the Central Naval Museum and Russian Geographical Society signed an agreement to preserve military heritage and work together on projects such as Santa Fé.

Russian Black Sea Fleet divers have since recovered a third StuG III assault gun from the wreck. In February 2020 it was reported that the Russian Navy's priority now is to make the wreck safe by detonating remaining unexploded ordnance in her cargo.
