= French destroyer L'Audacieux =

French Le Fantasque-class destroyer

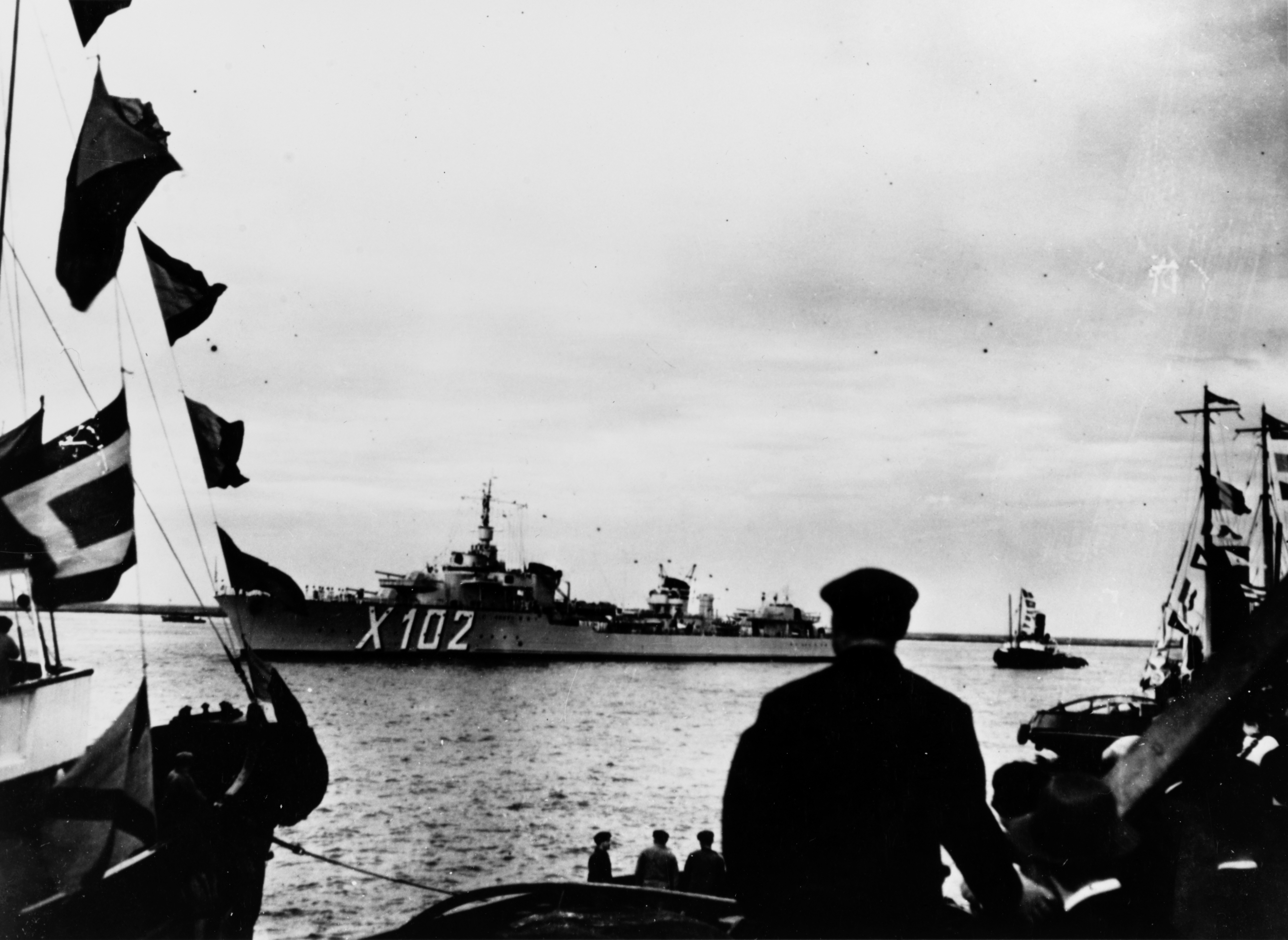
- L'Audacieux in port, circa 1939

History

France
- Name: L'Audacieux
- Namesake: The audacious one
- Ordered: 17 November 1930
- Builder: Arsenal de Lorient
- Laid down: 16 November 1931
- Launched: 15 March 1934
- Completed: 27 November 1935
- Commissioned: 1 August 1935
- In service: 7 December 1935
- Captured: 8 December 1942
- Fate: Sunk, 23 September 1940; Refloated, 11 March 1941; Sunk, 7 May 1943; Refloated, 14 December 1943; Scrapped, August 1947

General characteristics (as built)
- Class & type: Le Fantasque-class destroyer
- Displacement: 2,569 t (2,528 long tons) (standard); 3,417 t (3,363 long tons) (deep load)
- Length: 132.4 m (434 ft 5 in)
- Beam: 12 m (39 ft 4 in)
- Draft: 4.5 m (14 ft 9 in)
- Installed power: 4 water-tube boilers; 74,000 PS (54,000 kW; 73,000 shp)
- Propulsion: 2 shafts; 2 geared steam turbines
- Speed: 37 knots (69 km/h; 43 mph) (designed)
- Range: 2,700 nmi (5,000 km; 3,100 mi) at 15 knots (28 km/h; 17 mph)
- Complement: 11 officers, 254 sailors (wartime)
- Armament: 5 × single 138.6 mm (5.5 in) guns; 2 × single 37 mm (1.5 in) AA guns; 2 × twin 13.2 mm (0.52 in) AA machine guns; 3 × triple 550 mm (21.7 in) torpedo tubes; 2 × chutes for 28 depth charges; 40 × mines

L'Audacieux ("The audacious one") was one of six Le Fantasque-class large destroyers (contre-torpilleur, "Torpedo-boat destroyer") built for the Marine Nationale (French Navy) during the 1930s. The ship entered service in 1935 and participated in the Second World War. When war was declared in September 1939, all of the Le Fantasques were assigned to the Force de Raid, tasked to hunt down German commerce raiders and blockade runners. L'Audacieux and two of her sister ships were based in Dakar, French West Africa, to patrol the Central Atlantic for several months in late 1939. They returned to Metropolitan France before the end of the year and were transferred to French Algeria in late April 1940 in case Italy decided to enter the war. She screened French cruisers several times as they unsuccessfully hunted for Italian ships after Italy declared war in June.

After most of French Equatorial Africa had declared for Free France in August, L'Audacieux and two of her sisters escorted a force of cruisers sent to Dakar in September to intimidate the colonies into rejoining Vichy France. The British and Free French sent a force to persuade French West Africa to join the Free French and the Battle of Dakar began when the garrison rejected their entreaties. The Vichy French destroyers were initially given a defensive role, but L'Audacieux was ordered to conduct a reconnaissance mission. She encountered an Australian cruiser at close range and drifted onto the shore after her power was knocked out. The ship was salvaged in early 1941 and was slowly repaired enough to reach French Tunisia for permanent repairs in mid-1942. Captured when the Germans occupied Tunisia six months later, she was sunk when the Germans evacuated in May 1943. Refloated once more at the end of the year, she was deemed not worth repairing and was cannibalized for spare parts. Her wreck was scrapped in 1947.

== Design and description ==
The Le Fantasque-class ships were designed to counter the fast Italian Condottieri-class light cruisers and one member of the class, Le Terrible, exceeding 45 knots during trials to set a world record for a conventionally-hulled ship. They had an overall length of 132.4 meters (434 ft 5 in), a beam of 12 meters (39 ft 4 in), and a draft of 4.5 meters (14 ft 9 in). The ships displaced 2,569 metric tons (2,528 long tons) at standard and 3,417 metric tons (3,363 long tons) at deep load. L'Audacieux was powered by two Rateau-Bretagne geared steam turbines, each driving one propeller shaft, using steam provided by four water-tube boilers. The turbines were designed to produce 74,000 metric horsepower (54,000 kW; 73,000 shp), which was intended to give the ships a maximum speed of 37 knots (69 km/h; 43 mph). During her sea trials on 8 May 1935, her turbines provided 97,448 PS (71,673 kW; 96,115 shp) and she reached 42.4 knots (78.5 km/h; 48.8 mph) for a single hour. The ship carried enough fuel oil to give her a range of 2,700 nmi (5,000 km; 3,100 mi) at 15 knots (28 km/h; 17 mph). The crew of the Le Fantasque class consisted of 11 officers and 221 crewmen in peacetime, with the number of the latter increasing to 254 in wartime.

The main armament of the Le Fantasques consisted of five Canon de 138.6 mm (5.5 in) Modèle 1929 guns in single mounts, one superfiring pair fore and aft of the superstructure and the fifth gun abaft the aft funnel. Their anti-aircraft armament consisted of two Canon de 37 mm (1.5 in) Modèle 1925 guns in single mounts positioned amidships and four Hotchkiss Mitrailleuse de 13.2 mm (0.52 in) CA Modèle 1929 machine guns in two twin-gun mounts aft of the 37 mm mounts. The ships carried three above-water triple sets of 550-millimeter (21.7 in) torpedo tubes; the aft mount could traverse to both sides, but the forward mounts were positioned one on each broadside. A pair of depth charge chutes were built into their stern; these housed a total of sixteen 200-kilogram (440 lb) depth charges with another dozen available in the torpedo magazine. They could also be fitted with rails capable of handling 40 naval mines.

=== Modifications ===
In December 1938–January 1939, the bridge wings were enlarged to accommodate the Hotchkiss machine guns. After the war began, depth-charge stowage increased to 48 and a pair of rails were installed on the stern for 35-kilogram (77 lb) depth charges. Each rail could accommodate 3 depth charges and 15 more were stored in the magazine. In early 1940 twin-gun 37 mm mounts replaced the single-gun mounts and a single Browning 13.2-millimeter anti-aircraft machine gun was installed on the quarterdeck.

== Construction and career ==
Ordered on 17 November 1930 as part of the 1930 Naval Program, L'Audacieux was laid down on 16 November 1931 by Arsenal de Lorient. She was launched on 15 March 1934, commissioned on 1 August 1935, completed on 27 November and entered service on 7 December. Completion was delayed when her boilers had to be rebuilt because of defective firebricks. When the Le Fantasques entered service they were assigned to the newly formed 8th and 10th Light Divisions (Division légère) which were later redesignated as scout divisions (Division de contre-torpilleurs); both divisions were assigned to the 2nd Light Squadron (2eme Escadre légère) at Brest. As of 1 October 1936 L'Audacieux, Le Terrible and Le Fantasque were assigned to the 10th Light Division while L'Indomptable, Le Triomphant and Le Malin belonged to the 8th.

The ship departed Brest on 4 December 1935 to represent the Marine Nationale at the celebration of the tercentenary of the French colonization of the Antilles where she joined the cruiser Emile Bertin and the submarine Surcouf in making port visits to Pointe-à-Pitre, Guadeloupe, and Fort de France, Martinique. Albert Lebrun, President of France, inaugurated the new building of the Naval Academy (École Navale) in Brest and reviewed the 2nd Squadron on 30 May 1936, including L'Audacieux, L'Indomptable, Le Fantasque, and Le Terrible. Between 15 January and 26 February 1937, the 2nd Light Squadron cruised as far south as Conakry, French West Africa. On 27 May, Alphonse Gasnier-Duparc, Minister of the Navy, reviewed the fleet, including the Le Fantasques. L'Audacieux briefly served as flagship of the 2nd Light Squadron from 9 August 1938 until she was relieved on 7 November.

=== World War II ===
Both the 8th and 10th Scout Divisions were assigned to the Force de Raid, which was tasked to hunt down German commerce raiders and blockade runners, when war was declared in September 1939; it made only a single sortie as a complete unit on 2–6 September when it responded to an erroneous report that German ships had left port. Afterwards it was dispersed into smaller groups to better execute its mission. The 10th Scout Division, which consisted of L'Audacieux, Le Terrible, and Le Fantasque, together with British ships, was assigned to Force X that was based in Dakar, French West Africa, from 10 October to 18 November. During 21–30 October, the Force de Raid, including all of the Le Fantasques, screened Convoy KJ 4 against a possible attack by the heavy cruiser Admiral Graf Spee. The ships of the 10th Scout Division escorted the Strasbourg and the British aircraft carrier Hermes as they searched for German ships in the Central Atlantic between 7 and 13 November, then escorted Strasbourg and the heavy cruiser Algérie back to France on 18 November.

L'Audacieux was one of the escorts for Strasbourg and her sister Dunkerque as the Force de Raid reassembled at Mers-el-Kébir, French Algeria, in late April 1940 in an effort to intimidate the Italians from entering the war. She took part in a sortie by the Force de Raid into the Western Mediterranean on 12–13 June, after Italy declared war on the Allies on the 10th. L'Audacieux then began escorting convoys evacuating personnel from mainland France to French North Africa and screened cruisers fruitlessly searching for Italian cruisers on 23–24 June after an erroneous report that they were at sea. After the British attack on Mers-el-Kébir on 3 July, the ship escorted the cruisers that failed to rendezvous with Strasbourg, which escaped to Toulon.

By the end of August, all of French Equatorial Africa had joined Free France, with the exception of French Gabon. In response, the Germans and Italians authorized the Vichy French to send ships to the Gulf of Guinea to bring the rebellious colonies back under control. The 4th Cruiser Division (4^{e} Division de croiseurs) of three light cruisers, escorted by the 10th Scout Division, was chosen and the ships were designated as Force Y. They departed on 9 September and departed Casablanca, French Morocco, on the 12th after refueling. The destroyers lacked enough range to reach Dakar at the 24 knots (44 km/h; 28 mph) ordered by Contre amiral (Rear Admiral) Célestin Bourragué and were forced to return to Casablanca. They finally reached Dakar on 19–20 September.

A powerful British and Free French force was already en route to Dakar; their mission was to rally it to the Free French or to conquer it. The Vichy French garrison refused General Charles de Gaulle's appeal to join the Free French and opened fire on the British ships on 23 September. The French destroyers were tasked to make a continuous smoke screen to protect the cruisers as they maneuvered to avoid British shells. The heavy fog reduced the ability of the French ships to spot the British and L'Audacieux was ordered to venture forth on a reconnaissance mission. The ship was soon spotted by the Australian heavy cruiser Australia and was quickly hit at close range. Her bridge was destroyed by 8 in (203 mm) shells that also knocked out her power and set her on fire. The destroyer drifted ashore shortly afterwards near Rufisque. L'Audacieux lost 81 crewmen dead or missing during the battle.

She was refloated on 11 March 1941 and was slowly repaired so that she was able to sail to Bizerte, French Tunisia, on 7 August 1942 where she arrived on the 22nd; when the Germans occupied Bizerte on 8 December, the ship was in a dry dock and was not scuttled. L'Audacieux was damaged by Allied bombing and was sunk on 7 May 1943 when the Germans destroyed the dock's gate during their evacuation of the city. Her hulk was refloated on 14 December 1943, after she had been repaired enough to get her out of the dock. Deemed a constructive total loss, the ship was cannibalized for spare parts for Le Triomphant, Le Fantasque and Le Terrible. Her remains were scrapped in August 1947.

== Bibliography ==
- Jordan, John & Moulin, Jean (2013). French Cruisers, 1922−1956. Barnsley, UK: Seaforth Publishing. ISBN 978-1-84832-133-5.
- Jordan, John & Moulin, Jean (2015). French Destroyers: Torpilleurs d'Escadre & Contre-Torpilleurs 1922–1956. Barnsley, UK: Seaforth Publishing. ISBN 978-1-84832-198-4.
- Roberts, John (1980). "France". In Chesneau, Roger (ed.). Conway's All the World's Fighting Ships 1922–1946. New York: Mayflower Books. pp. 255–279. ISBN 0-8317-0303-2.
- Rohwer, Jürgen (2005). Chronology of the War at Sea 1939–1945: The Naval History of World War Two (Third Revised ed.). Annapolis, Maryland: Naval Institute Press. ISBN 1-59114-119-2.
