= Célestin Bourragué =

French naval officer

- Born: Célestin-Jean-Léon Bourragué; 22 November 1886; Brassac, Tarn, France
- Died: 21 March 1955 (aged 68); Paris, France
- Military career
- Allegiance: France
- Branch: French Navy
- Rank: Vice-amiral

Célestin Bourragué (22 November 1886 – 21 March 1955) was a French naval officer who served in the First and Second World Wars.

== Naval career ==
The son of a primary school inspector, he entered the École Navale (Naval School) in October 1902 and graduated as an aspirant 1st class in October 1905. He then carried out his first campaign in the Far East (October 1905) aboard the armored cruiser Dupetit-Thouars then the protected cruiser D'Entrecasteaux before being appointed in October 1907, ensign and maneuver officer of the destroyer Cassini in March 1908 during operations on the coasts of Morocco (1908–1909).

In October 1909, he entered the École des torpilles (Torpedo School) in Toulon on the protected cruiser Amiral Cécille and was patented torpedo boat with congratulations from the Minister. He then left on the pre-dreadnought battleship Charles Martel in September 1910 where he was appointed to the torpedo and electricity service.

Second in the submarine Faraday at Rochefort, his Rochefort-Toulon crossing in September earned him satisfaction. He was then assigned to the 2nd squadron of submarines at Bizerte and was responsible for May 1914 of the TSF on the semi-dreadnought battleship Vérité. He then took part in the first operations at the Dardanelles (autumn).

Promoted lieutenant in March 1916, aide-de-camp to Admiral Fatou, superior commander of the Mediterranean patrol flotillas with a specialty in TSF, he participated very actively in the evacuation operations of the Serbian Army and became April 1917, commander of the trawler Richelieu and a division of patrol boats which earned him in September a new testimony of satisfaction and a quote for having saved and brought back to port the torpedoed steamer Saint-Joseph in the middle of four underwater attacks out of forty-six towing hours.

At the General Staff in March 1918 in the communications section, he was responsible for the radio equipment of merchant ships. In 1920, the minister's orderly officer, he commanded the torpedo boat Matelot Leblanc ( April 1921 ) and becomes a captain in corvette August 1922. He then taught the staff course at the War School and at the Center for Advanced Naval Studies.

Commander in November 1925, commander of the torpedo boat Mars ( December 1927 ) then the 7th Squadron of Torpedo Boats (1928) and the 3rd Section of the General Staff ( May 1929 ), he becomes captain in May 1931 and order in September 1933 the heavy cruiser Dupleix in the Mediterranean.

1 Wing Chief of Staff on the heavy cruiser Algerie in October 1935, he is promoted in July 1936 Secretary of the Superior Council of the Navy and Head of the Naval Armaments Studies Section at the General Staff.

Rear Admiral in January 1937, Deputy Chief of the General Staff in July 1938, he participates in August 1939 as commander of the 4th cruiser division on the light cruiser Georges Leygues in Atlantic squadron in the Force de Raid operations of winter 1939–1940.

Force Commander Y August 1940 comprising three cruisers and three destroyers, it took part in the Battle of Dakar in September under the orders of Admiral Émile Lacroix and managed to avoid any engagement with the British squadron which supervised it.

In November 1940, he chaired the Coordination Committee for Imperial Telecommunications. Vice Admiral ( March 1941 ), Chief of the Defense Staff (October), Director of Armistice Services ( April 1942 ) and again chairman of the Imperial Telecommunications Committee ( April 1943 ), he entered the 2nd section of the General Staff in November 1945 and chairs the association of former students of the naval school. He died in Paris on 21 March 1955.

== Awards ==
- Chevalier (29 janvier 1918), officier (12 janvier 1929), commandeur (24 décembre 1937) puis grand officier de la Légion d'honneur (10 mai 1950)

== Bibliography ==
- Halpern, Paul G., ed. (2016). The Mediterranean Fleet, 1930–1939. Publications of the Navy Records Society. Vol. 163. London: Routledge for the Navy Records Society. ISBN 978-1-4724-7597-8.
- Taillemite, Etienne (1982). Dictionnaire des marins français. Paris: Editions maritimes et d'Outre-Mer. OCLC 470113586.
