= Dunkerque-class battleship =

Ship class in the French-navy

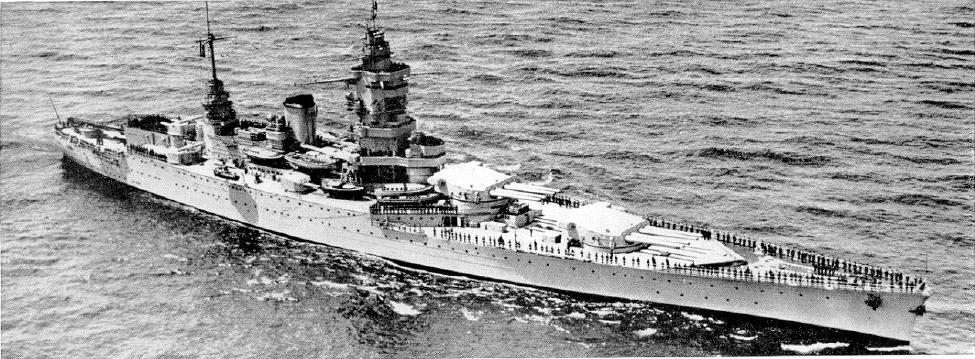
- Dunkerque

Class overview
- Name: Dunkerque class
- Builders: Arsenal de Brest; Ateliers et Chantiers de Saint-Nazaire Penhoët
- Operators: French Navy
- Preceded by: Lyon class (planned); Bretagne class (actual)
- Succeeded by: Richelieu class
- Built: 1932–1938
- In service: 1937–1942
- Completed: 2
- Lost: 2

General characteristics
- Type: Fast battleship
- Displacement: 26,500 t (26,100 long tons) (standard); 35,500 t (34,900 long tons) (deep load)
- Length: 214.5 m (703 ft 9 in)
- Beam: 31.1 m (102 ft)
- Draft: 8.7 m (28 ft 7 in)
- Installed power: 107,500 shp (80,200 kW); 6 Indret boilers
- Propulsion: 4 × screws; 4 × geared steam turbines
- Speed: 29.5 knots (54.6 km/h; 33.9 mph)
- Range: 7,850 nmi (14,540 km; 9,030 mi) at 15 knots (28 km/h; 17 mph); 2,450 nmi (4,540 km; 2,820 mi) at 28.5 knots (52.8 km/h; 32.8 mph)
- Crew: 81 officers; 1,300 enlisted men
- Armament: 8 × 330 mm (13 in) guns; 16 × 130 mm (5.1 in) DP guns; 8 × 37 mm (1.5 in) AA guns; 32 × 13.2 mm (0.52 in) AA machineguns
- Armour: Belt armour: 225 mm (8.9 in); Main deck: 115 mm (4.5 in); Gun turrets: 330 mm (13 in); Conning tower: 270 mm (10.6 in)
- Aircraft carried: 2 floatplanes

The Dunkerque class was a pair of fast battleships built for the French Navy in the 1930s; the two ships were Dunkerque and Strasbourg. They were the first French battleships built since the Bretagne class of pre-World War I vintage, and they were heavily influenced by the Washington Treaty system that limited naval construction in the 1920s and 1930s. French battleship studies initially focused on countering fast Italian heavy cruisers, leading to early designs for small, relatively lightly protected capital ships. But the advent of the powerful German Deutschland-class cruisers proved to be more threatening to French interests, prompting the need for larger and more heavily armed and armoured vessels. The final design, completed by 1932, produced a small battleship armed with eight 330 mm (13 in) guns that were concentrated in two quadruple gun turrets forward, with armour sufficient to defeat the Deutschlands' 283 mm (11.1 in) guns. Strasbourg was completed to a slightly modified design, receiving somewhat heavier armour in response to new Italian Littorio-class battleships. Smaller and less heavily armed and armoured than all other treaty battleships, the Dunkerques have sometimes been referred to as battlecruisers.

The two ships had relatively short careers; completed just before the outbreak of World War II, they served briefly with the Atlantic Squadron in the late 1930s, and Dunkerque made several visits abroad, including to French West Africa in 1938 and visits to Britain in 1937 and 1939. With war looming in August 1939, the French created the Force de Raid (Raiding Force), centred on the two Dunkerques, which was tasked with hunting down the Deutschlands that were expected to operate in the Atlantic as commerce raiders. The French never caught the German cruisers, and instead the vessels were sent to Mers-el-Kébir to deter Italy from entering the war against France. After Germany defeated France in the Battle of France in June 1940, the French were forced to neutralise their fleet, and the two Dunkerques were to remain inactive at Mers-el-Kébir. Unaware that Germany had no intention of seizing the ships, the British sent Force H to sink the ships; Dunkerque was damaged in the Attack on Mers-el-Kébir in July, but Strasbourg escaped to Toulon, where she became the flagship of the Forces de haute mer (High Seas Forces).

Dunkerque was badly damaged in another attack but was temporarily repaired and eventually returned to Toulon for permanent repairs. Strasbourg saw little activity during this period, as the armistice with Germany limited training operations. Dunkerque was still in drydock when the Germans launched Case Anton, occupying the rest of France in November 1942. To prevent the Germans from seizing the ships, the French Navy scuttled the fleet in Toulon. Both ships were badly damaged and were handed over to Italian control, where they were partially broken up. Their hulks, which were bombed by American aircraft in 1944, were eventually sold for scrap in the 1950s.

== Background and development ==
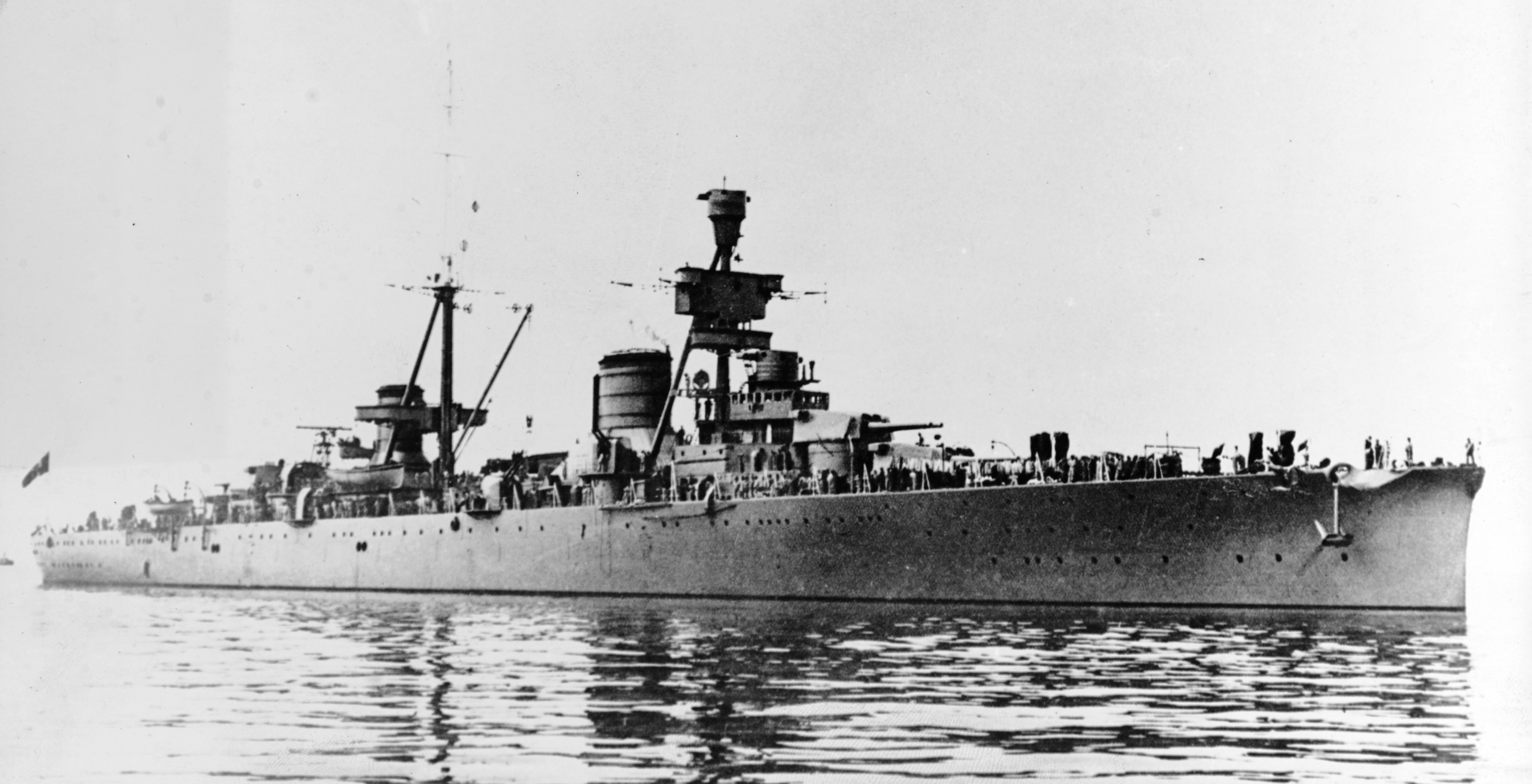
Trieste, one of the Trento-class cruisers the early French battleship designs were intended to counter

Wary of another naval arms race similar to the Anglo-German race that was seen as contributing to the start of World War I, the world's major navies held the Washington Naval Conference in 1921 to discuss controls on battleship construction, both to limit their size and armament but also to limit the number of ships that could be built. The resulting Washington Naval Treaty limited the French Navy to 175,000 long tons (178,000 t) of total battleship tonnage; French resistance to a halt on battleship construction, in light of the obsolescent Courbet and Bretagne-class battleships that formed the core of its fleet, led to an exception for France (and Italy) to replace 70,000 long tons (71,000 t) worth of battleships during the moratorium, to be laid down in 1927 and 1929. Maximum displacement of any new battleship was restricted to 35,000 long tons (36,000 t) at standard displacement.

In 1926, the Chief of the Naval General Staff, Admiral Henri Salaun, requested a new capital ship design with a displacement of 17,500 long tons (17,800 t), intended to counter the new generation of Italian heavy cruisers. The first of these Italian vessels, the two Trento-class cruisers, were fast and posed a considerable threat to French shipping in the western Mediterranean between metropolitan France and its colonies in French North Africa. The new French vessel would be armed with a battery of eight 305 mm (12 in) guns mounted in two quadruple gun turrets, both arranged forward, since the French envisioned using the ships to chase down the Italian cruisers. The ships would have been armoured to resist the 203 mm (8 in) guns of the Italian cruisers, and since the guns were concentrated forward, the amount of armour necessary to protect the ship's vitals allowed significant savings in weight. For the prescribed displacement, four such vessels could be built in the allotted 70,000 tons. The concept was strongly influenced by the British Nelson-class battleships, which mounted their battery entirely forward to save armour weight.

Illustration of the 36,000-ton design

The German Deutschland-class cruisers, which were armed with a battery of six 283 mm guns, coupled with hesitance on the French Navy's part to commit to small capital ships while Italy still kept its allotted tonnage uncommitted led the French to abandon the 17,500-ton project. New design studies were prepared in 1926–1927, resulting in several proposals in 1928 for a 36,000-long-ton (37,000 t) design. These ships were in most respects an enlarged version of the Suffren class of heavy cruisers then being built. The increase in displacement brought with it a third quadruple 305 mm turret placed aft and heavier armour protection in a version capable of 33 knots (61 km/h; 38 mph), while a slower 27-knot (50 km/h; 31 mph) ship was to be armed with six 406 mm (16 in) guns in twin turrets. Shortages of funding, both for the ships themselves and the necessary improvements to shipyards and harbour facilities to build and operate the vessels ended the proposals. Additionally, political concerns, particularly French efforts to lead disarmament talks in the League of Nations, convinced the French government to delay the construction of any new battleships.

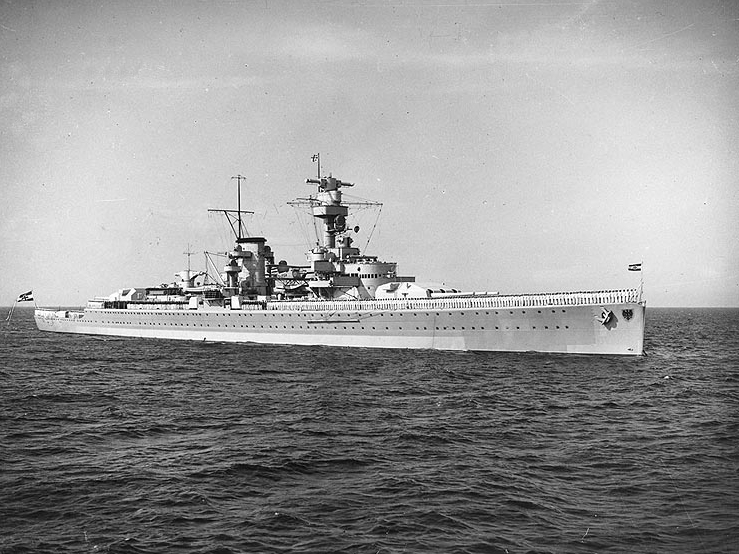
The German cruiser Deutschland, which prompted significant revisions to what eventually became the Dunkerque class

Design studies continued after the London Naval Treaty, where the British had unsuccessfully pushed for reductions in the maximum displacement and gun calibre. As a show of support for the British position, the French naval command requested designs with a maximum displacement of 25,000 long tons (25,000 t)—the ceiling sought by the British—and a minimum 23,333 long tons (23,707 t)—the maximum displacement that would allow three new ships to be built using the allotted 70,000 tons that France still had available. Apart from the increased size and thicker belt armour, the proposed ship carried the same main battery as the 17,500-ton ship. By this time, Germany had finally begun building the first of the Deutschlands; this led to renewed concerns over the level of armour protection, which was still too thin to defeat the German 283 mm gun. After pressure from the French parliament over the perceived weakness of the design, the Chief of the Naval Staff issued a new set of requirements, including an increase in standard displacement to 25,000 long tons (25,000 t), an armament of eight 330 mm guns, and armour sufficient to resist 283 mm projectiles.

As refining work on the design progressed, it became apparent that the 25,000-ton standard displacement was too low to accommodate the requested characteristics, so it was increased first to 26,000 long tons (26,000 t) and finally to 26,500 long tons (26,900 t). Work on the project was completed by early 1932 and it was formally approved on 27 April. The improved armour layout not only rendered the ships immune to 283 mm fire at expected battle ranges, but it was also capable of defeating the 305 mm guns of the older Italian battleships still in service. The first ship, to be named Dunkerque, was ordered on 26 October 1932, with a second projected for the 1934 programme. The Italian announcement in May 1934 that they would begin building new 35,000-ton battleships armed with 381 mm (15 in) guns threatened to throw French plans into disarray, since these ships would be vastly superior to the Dunkerque design, but the first French ship had already been laid down and it was too late to redesign the second vessel, Strasbourg, in response. Side armour for the second ship would be slightly increased while design work began immediately on a 35,000-ton counter to the Italian ships, which produced the Richelieu class.

The Dunkerque-class ships' relatively small size and light armament and emphasis on speed rather than protection, especially compared to the other treaty battleships of the period, has led some to classify them as battlecruisers.

== Characteristics ==
Inboard profile of Dunkerque

The two ships differed slightly in their dimensions; both were 209 m (685 ft 8 in) long between perpendiculars, while Dunkerque was 215.14 m (705 ft 10 in) long overall while Strasbourg was 215.5 m (707 ft) overall. The two ships both had a beam of 31.1 m (102 ft). Dunkerque displaced 26,500 long tons (26,900 t) standard, 30,260 long tons (30,750 t) normally, and 34,900 long tons (35,500 t) fully loaded. Strasbourg was slightly heavier, at 27,300 long tons (27,700 t) standard, 31,070 long tons (31,570 t) normally, and 35,810 long tons (36,380 t) at full load, with the difference being the result of increased armour protection. Draft for Dunkerque measured 8.57 m (28 ft 1 in) normally and increased to 9.71 m (31 ft 10 in) at full load, and Strasbourg drew 8.73 m (28 ft 8 in) at normal loading and 9.89 m (32 ft 5 in) at full load.

Dunkerque had a crew of 81 officers and 1,300 sailors, while Strasbourg's crew consisted of 32 officers and 1,270 sailors, the additional crew aboard Dunkerque being an admiral's staff, as she typically operated as a flagship. Each vessel carried a number of smaller boats, including a variety of motor pinnaces, whaleboats, launches, and dinghies. Steering was controlled by a single rudder; the rudder had a range of train from 0 to 32 degrees from the centreline, but had a tendency to jam when turned further than 25 degrees. The rudder was electrically operated, but the ships also had manual controls in the event of a power failure.

The ships carried three Loire 130 seaplanes for use as reconnaissance and spotter aircraft on the fantail, and the aircraft facilities consisted of a 22 m (72 ft 2 in) steam catapult, a hangar, and a crane to handle the floatplanes. The hangar had two storeys and an internal elevator and included workshops to maintain the aircraft while underway. The crane could be folded flat across the deck while not in use.

=== Machinery ===
Arrangement of the ships' propulsion systems

The ships were powered by four sets of Parsons geared steam turbines driving four 3-bladed screws for Dunkerque and 4-bladed screws for Strasbourg. Steam was provided by six oil-fired Indret water-tube boilers, ducted into a single large funnel. The Dunkerques adopted the unit system of machinery for their propulsion system, which split the machinery into two separate systems. The arrangement offered improved damage resistance, since one system could be disabled due to battle damage and the other could remain in operation. The ships' boilers were arranged in side-by-side pairs in three boiler rooms; the first was placed below the command tower and the other two were placed below the funnel. The turbines were divided between two engine rooms; the first contained the outer shafts and was placed between the boiler rooms, and the inner turbines were placed in an engine room aft of the rear boiler room.

The ships were rated for a top speed of 29.5 knots (54.6 km/h; 33.9 mph) from 107,000 shaft horsepower (80,000 kW) as designed. On speed tests, Dunkerque reached a maximum of 31.06 knots (57.52 km/h; 35.74 mph) from 135,585 shp (101,106 kW), while Strasbourg made 30.9 knots (57.2 km/h; 35.6 mph) from 131,960 shp (98,400 kW). Fuel oil storage amounted to 4,400 to 4,900 long tons (4,500 to 5,000 t) in peacetime but it was reduced to 3,600 long tons (3,700 t) in wartime to prevent the weight of fuel from reducing the armoured freeboard. At a cruising speed of 15 knots (28 km/h; 17 mph) under wartime fuel conditions, the ships had a range of 7,850 nautical miles (14,540 km; 9,030 mi), and at 28 knots (52 km/h; 32 mph), their cruising radius fell to 2,450 nmi (4,540 km; 2,820 mi). The ships' electrical systems were powered by four 900 kW (1,200 hp) turbo generators, with two per engine room, with backup power for critical systems provided by two 100 kW (130 hp) diesel generators located below the tower. For use while in port, three 400 kW (540 hp) diesel generators were fitted, and these were located in a separate room below the ammunition magazines for the main battery.

=== Armament ===
Both ships were armed with eight 330 mm 50-caliber (cal.) guns arranged in two quadruple gun turrets, both of which were placed in a superfiring pair forward of the superstructure. Saint Chamond designed the turrets, which allowed for a maximum elevation to 35 degrees for a maximum range of 41,500 m (45,400 yd) and depression to -5 degrees. The guns were carried in individual cradles that allowed for limited independent operation, and the guns could be loaded at any angle, though the crews typically returned them to 15 degrees to reduce the likelihood of the shells becoming jammed, a problem that could occur when the guns were at high angles of elevation and other guns in the same turret were fired. To reduce the risk of a single shell hit disabling all four guns, the turrets were divided by an internal bulkhead, and they were spaced 27 m (88 ft 7 in) apart. The guns fired a 570 kg (1,260 lb) shell at a muzzle velocity of 870 m/s (2,900 ft/s); the shells featured a relatively large bursting charge for their size, reflective of the fact that the Dunkerques were intended to fight the relatively lightly-armoured Deutschlands. Ammunition storage amounted to 456 shells for the forward turret and 440 shells for the superfiring turret. Their rate of fire was between 1.5 and 2 shots per gun per minute.

The ships' secondary armament consisted of sixteen 130 mm (5.1 in) 45-cal. dual-purpose guns; these were mounted in three quadruple and two twin turrets. The quadruple turrets were placed on the stern, with one on the centreline on the superstructure and the other two on either side on the upper deck, and the twin turrets were located amidships, just forward of the funnel. They were the first dual-purpose guns of the French Navy. The guns had range of elevation from -10 to 75 degrees; at 45 degrees, their maximum range was 20,800 m (22,700 yd). Their rate of fire was 10 to 12 shells per minute. They were supplied with both 33.4 kg (74 lb) armour-piercing (AP) shells for use against warships and 29.5 kg (65 lb) high-explosive (HE) shells for use against aircraft. Each gun was allocated approximately 400 shells, a third of which were the AP shells, with the remainder being HE and star shells.

Close-range antiaircraft defence was provided by a battery of ten 37 mm (1.5 in) guns in twin mounts for Dunkerque and eight such guns for Strasbourg, along with thirty-two 13.2 mm (0.52 in) machine guns in quadruple mounts for Dunkerque and thirty-six guns for Strasbourg. Two of the 37 mm mounts were placed abreast of the superfiring turret, with the remaining three on the aft superstructure one of which was on the centreline; Strasbourg omitted the centreline mount, receiving instead another quadruple 13.2 mm gun in its place. Two of the 13.2 mm mounts were located on the upper deck on either side of the command tower, four were arranged around the upper deck further aft, and the remaining two were placed on the aft superstructure.

==== Fire control ====
The ships were the first French battleships designed with fire-control directors. The ships carried five directors that each had a stereoscopic rangefinder for the main and secondary batteries. For the main guns, one director with a 12 m (39 ft 4 in) rangefinder was mounted on the tower and a second with an 8 m (26 ft 3 in) rangefinder on the aft superstructure. Atop the forward director were a pair of directors for the secondary guns, the first with a 6 m (19 ft 8 in) rangefinder and the top unit with a 5 m (16 ft 5 in) rangefinder. A third director for the secondary battery was mounted on the roof of the aft main director, also with a 6 m rangefinder. Both main-battery turrets were fitted with their own 12 m rangefinders and the secondary quadruple turrets received 6 m rangefinders for local control in the event the directors were disabled. Fire control equipment for the anti-aircraft battery consisted of four 1 m (3 ft 3 in) rangefinders, two forward on the tower and two on the aft superstructure. The directors were used to gather range, bearing, and inclination data, which was then sent to a central control station below the armour decks; there, plotting tables and analog computers were used to calculate firing solutions for the guns. The guns were remotely controlled via electric motors, but the system proved to be problematic in service, as the training and elevation gears were unreliable, the system that communicated commands from the directors to the guns frequently did not work, and the gunners needed to revert to manual control to make small adjustments. The ships' systems were modified in an attempt to correct these problems, but they never worked reliably.

=== Armour ===
Armour layout Dunkerque

The ships' protection scheme incorporated the all or nothing principle. Their belt armour was 225 mm (8.9 in) thick amidships for Dunkerque and 283 mm (11.1 in) for Strasbourg, backed by 60 mm (2.4 in) of teak for both ships, extending from the forward 330 mm magazine to the aft 130 mm magazine. The belt was capped on either end by transverse armoured bulkheads; the forward bulkheads were 210 mm (8.3 in) for Dunkerque and 228 mm (9 in) for Strasbourg, and the aft bulkheads were 180 mm (7.1 in) and 210 mm, respectively. It was inclined 11.3 degrees from the vertical to improve its resistance to plunging fire. The belt extended from about 3.5 m (11 ft 6 in) above the waterline and 2 m (6 ft 7 in) below. The armoured box created by the belt and bulkheads was covered by two armour decks, the first of these connected to the top of the belt and was 125 mm (4.9 in) over the forward magazines and reduced to 115 mm (4.5 in) over the propulsion machinery and aft magazines, backed by a 15 mm (0.59 in) steel deck. The lower deck was 40 mm (1.6 in) thick, with sloping sides that connected to the lower edge of the belt; for Strasbourg, the sloped sides were increased to 50 mm (2 in). Aft of the central citadel, the stern was protected by a 100 mm (3.9 in) deck with sloped sides, and additional 50 mm plates covered that portion of the deck that protected the steering gear.

The main-battery turrets were protected by 330 mm of armour plate on the faces, 250 mm (9.8 in) on the sides, and 150 mm (5.9 in) on the roofs, while Strasbourg received slightly better protection, with 360 mm (14.2 in) faces and 160 mm (6.3 in) roofs. Their rear plates varied between the turrets and between the ships, and were heavy to balance the weight of the guns. For Dunkerque, her forward turret had a 345 mm (13.6 in) rear plate and her superfiring turret had a 335 mm (13.2 in) rear; Strasbourg had 352 mm (13.9 in) and 342 mm (13.5 in) plates, respectively. The turrets sat atop armoured barbettes that were 310 mm (12 in) for Dunkerque and 340 mm (13.4 in) for Strasbourg; both were reduced to 50 mm below the upper deck. Both ships' secondary turrets had 135 mm (5.3 in) faces, 90 mm (3.5 in) sides and roofs, and 80 mm (3.1 in) rears, atop 120 mm (4.7 in) barbettes. The conning tower had 270 mm (10.6 in) thick sides, reduced to 220 mm (8.7 in) on its rear and 130 to 150 mm (5.1 to 5.9 in) on the roof. The tower received light protection against aircraft strafing attacks in the form of 10 mm (0.39 in) plating, while the fire-control directors were protected with 20 mm (0.79 in) steel.

Defence against underwater attacks—torpedoes and naval mines—came in the form of layered torpedo bulkheads that incorporated liquid-filled voids to absorb blast effects. In addition, a rubber-based compound referred to as ébonite mousse was used to help absorb the impact and control flooding in critical areas. The underwater protection system covered the same area of the hull as the belt armour. The system included three bulkheads, the first of which was 16 mm (0.63 in) thick, followed by a 10 mm bulkhead, and backed by the main torpedo bulkhead, which was 30 mm (1.2 in) thick. Where it protected the machinery spaces, the system had a depth of almost 7.5 m (24 ft 7 in), compared to the depth of contemporary foreign ships, which was typically around 5 m (16 ft 5 in). Where the system had to be narrowed, abreast the forward and aft magazines, the main bulkhead increased in thickness to 40 and then 50 mm to account for the reduction in effectiveness. To prevent the explosion of a mine below the hull from breaching the ammunition magazines, the bottoms of the magazines were raised above the double bottom, and they were protected by 30 mm plates.

=== Modifications ===
The ships received relatively minor modifications in their short careers; both ships received a funnel cap to reduce smoke interference with the command tower in 1938. After the start of World War II, the 12 m rangefinder for the forward main battery director was replaced with a 14 m (45 ft 11 in) version aboard Dunkerque, while Strasbourg did not receive an updated rangefinder. A degaussing cable was fitted to Strasbourg to reduce the risk of detonating German magnetic mines during a refit from November 1939 to January 1940, and during another refit in August–September, a steel screen was erected to protect the light anti-aircraft guns from strafing attacks. Strasbourg had her command tower modified in November and December 1940 to refit her for use as a flagship, as Dunkerque had been disabled by that point. While Dunkerque was under repair at Toulon in 1942, consideration was given to replacing her aviation facilities with additional 37 mm guns to improve her anti-aircraft defences, but this work was not begun before the fleet was scuttled in November. During another refit from January to April 1942, Strasbourg's forward 37 mm mounts were moved from her forecastle to the weather deck, as they were on Dunkerque, and she received an air-search radar set with four antennae. Early tests with the set indicated a detection range of 50 km (31 mi).

== Ships ==
Construction data
Ship	Builder	Programme	Laid down	launched	Commissioned	In service
Dunkerque	Arsenal de Brest	1931	24 December 1932	2 October 1935	31 December 1936	1 September 1938
Strasbourg	Ateliers et Chantiers de Saint-Nazaire Penhoët, Saint-Nazaire	1934	24 November 1934	12 December 1936	15 September 1938	24 April 1939

== Service history ==
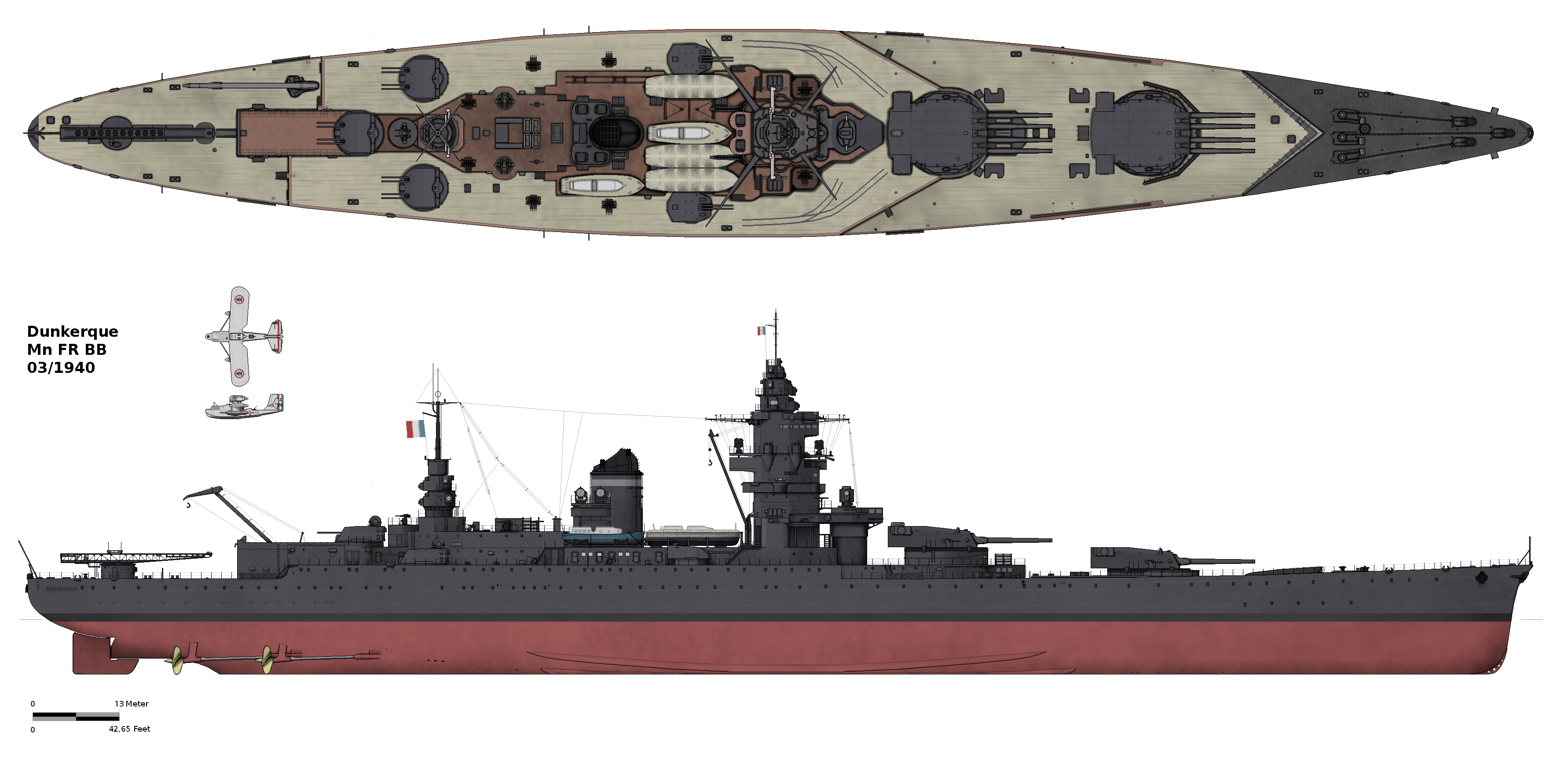
Dunkerque as she appeared in 1940

After commissioning in 1936, Dunkerque required extensive testing and evaluation, including extensive trials with her guns, as both the main and secondary battery mounts were new to French naval service. During this period, in May 1937, she represented France at the Naval Review for the coronation of King George VI and Queen Elizabeth. In early 1938, Dunkerque toured France's West African colonies and islands in the Caribbean. After finally being pronounced ready for active service in September, she became the flagship of the Atlantic Squadron. Shortly thereafter, Strasbourg was commissioned to begin working up, but the increasingly unstable international situation in Europe forced the French to rush the ship through trials; Strasbourg got little more than six months of testing and training before entering service, compared to more than two years for Dunkerque.

During the Sudetenland Crisis with Germany in early April 1939, Dunkerque was sent to cover the return of the training cruiser Jeanne d'Arc as it returned from a cruise in the Caribbean, as a nearby German squadron would have threatened the vessel if war had broken out. Strasbourg then joined the squadron and the two ships were designated the 1st Battle Division. The ships visited Portugal in May before embarking on a lengthy tour of Britain later that month and in June. Both vessels conducted extensive training exercises off Brittany in July and August as Europe drifted toward war. As tensions rose with Germany over the latter's aggressive demands on Polish territory, the British and French naval commands agreed to divide responsibilities for joint operations in the anticipated war; France would cover Allied shipping in the central Atlantic, and for this purpose, Dunkerque and Strasbourg were assigned to the new Force de Raid (Raiding Force) to hunt down German commerce raiders.

=== World War II ===
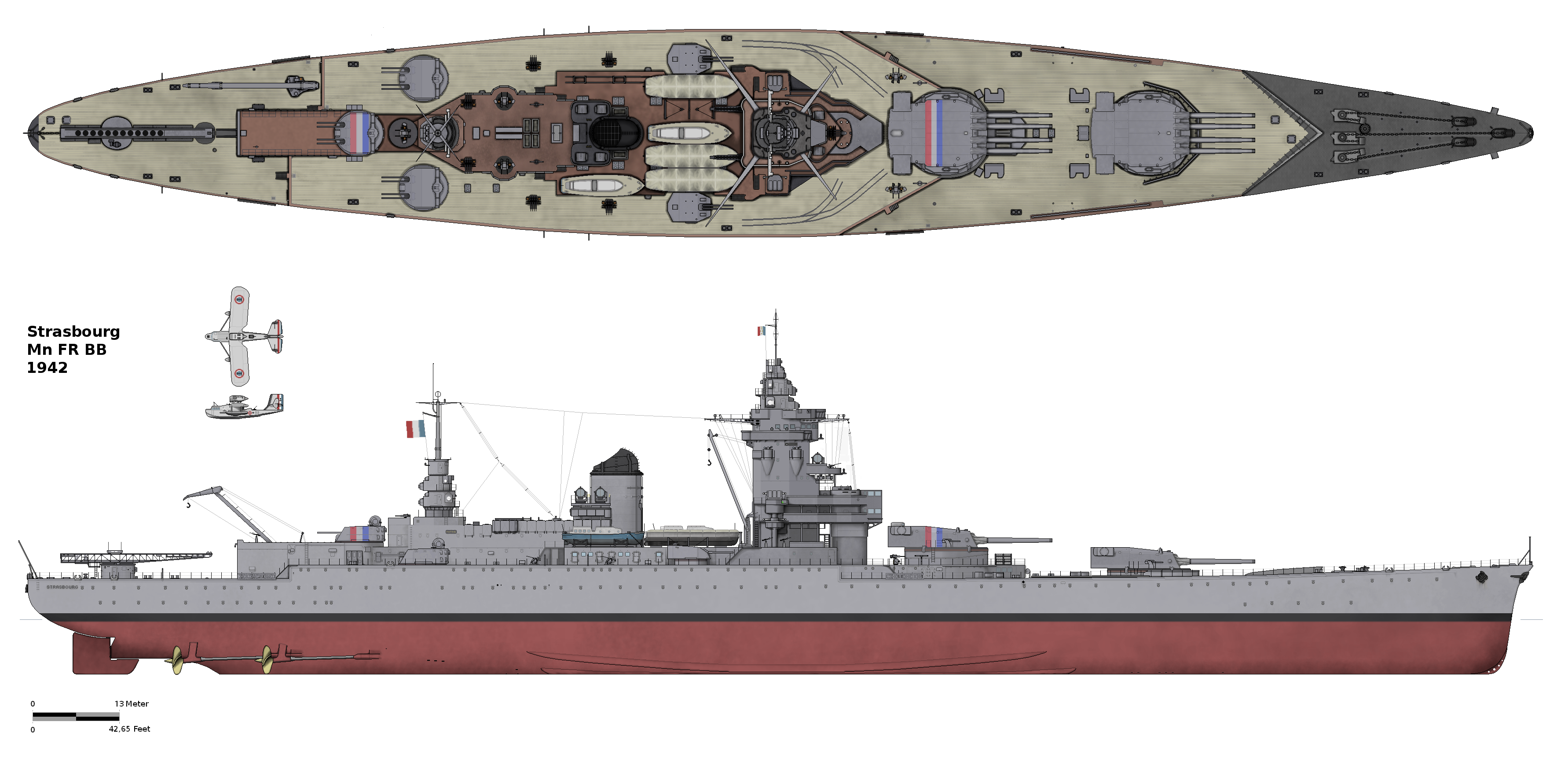
Strasbourg as she appeared in 1942

With the outbreak of war in early September, the Force de Raid, under the command of Vice-amiral d'Escadre (Squadron Vice Admiral) Marcel-Bruno Gensoul, went to sea when reports indicated that the German Deutschland-class cruisers had sortied to attack Allied shipping. The German raiders were still in the North Sea, however, and so after meeting a French passenger liner, the Force de Raid returned to port. The unit was then split to increase the chances of finding the German cruisers, with Dunkerque operating out of Brest, France, with the aircraft carrier Béarn while Strasbourg moved south to Dakar in French West Africa in company with the British carrier HMS Hermes. In November, Dunkerque joined the battlecruiser HMS Hood to hunt for the German battleships Scharnhorst and Gneisenau, but they were unable to locate the German vessels.

In late November, Strasbourg was recalled from Dakar and the Force de Raid was reconstituted. Dunkerque carried a shipment of part of the Banque de France's gold reserve to Canada and then escorted a troop ship convoy to Britain in December. The ships were sent to the Mediterranean in early 1940 as the threat of war with Italy increased; the French hoped to use the show of force to deter Italy from entering the war. Consideration was given to sending them to support the Norwegian Campaign in April 1940, but Italy's increasingly hostile posture forced the French to keep them in the Mediterranean. Based in Mers-el-Kébir along with other elements of the French fleet, the ships saw little activity during the Battle of France that ended with French defeat; the Armistice mandated that the French fleet would be demilitarised, with Dunkerque and Strasbourg to remain in Mers-el-Kébir.

==== Mers-el-Kébir ====
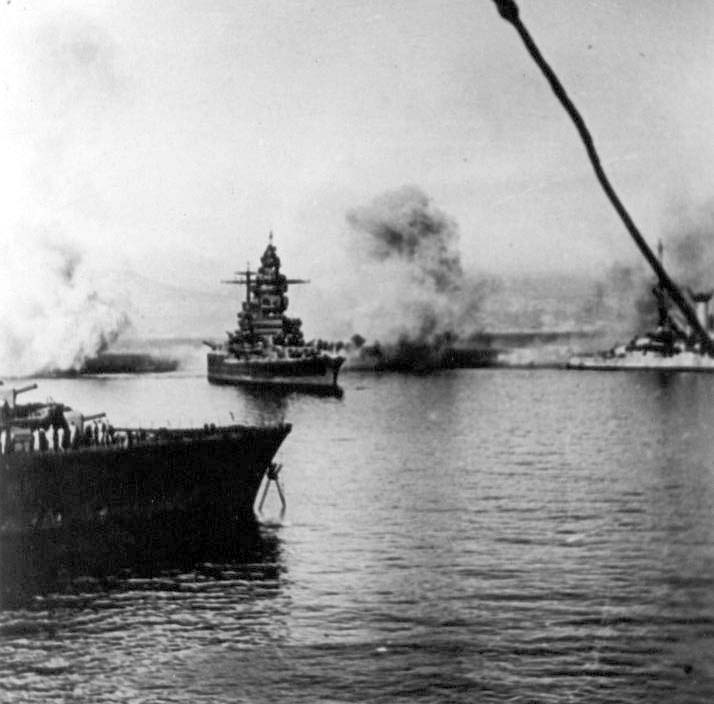
Strasbourg slips her moorings and makes for open water while under fire from the British Force H

The British government, incorrectly fearing that the Germans intended to seize the French fleet and employ it against Britain, embarked on a campaign to neutralise the vessels. The British Force H, which included Hood and the battleships Resolution and Valiant, was sent to either compel the French vessels at Mers-el-Kébir to join the Free French Forces, be demilitarised in France's Caribbean colonies or the United States, or to sink them. After Gensoul rejected their demands, the British opened fire. The French ships were moored with their sterns toward the sea, which initially prevented Dunkerque and Strasbourg from returning fire until they could get underway. The 15 in (381 mm) guns of the British ships quickly inflicted serious damage on Dunkerque and the old battleships Bretagne and Provence. Dunkerque's crew was forced to beach her to prevent her from sinking; Bretagne exploded and Provence sank to the harbour bottom. Strasbourg, however, was able to slip her moorings and escape from the harbour in the confusion. Escorted by four destroyers, she avoided the British fleet and escaped to Toulon.

Repair work began almost immediately on Dunkerque, with a view toward restoring the ship to seaworthy condition so she could be returned to Toulon for drydocking and permanent repairs. Upon learning that the ship had not been permanently disabled, the British returned and launched an air strike from the carrier HMS Ark Royal, for which Gensoul and Dunkerque's commanders had failed to erect defences, either in the form of torpedo nets or manned anti-aircraft guns. The Fairey Swordfish torpedo bombers failed to score any direct hits on Dunkerque, but a pair of torpedoes struck the patrol boat Terre-Neuve that had been moored alongside the ship. Those hits led to a secondary explosion of that vessel's depth charges that amounted to an equivalent of eight aerial torpedoes, which caused extensive damage to Dunkerque's hull. Nevertheless, repair work quickly resumed, and her holed hull was plated over and pumped dry.

In the meantime, Strasbourg became the flagship of the Forces de haute mer, which was created from the remains of the French fleet still available in Toulon, under the command of Amiral Jean de Laborde. During this period, limitations on French naval activity from the armistice kept Strasbourg largely in port, limited to two training cruises per month. In September 1940, the ship and several cruisers sortied to cover Provence, which had been repaired and refloated after the attack on Mers-el-Kébir, as she returned to Toulon.

By April 1941, Dunkerque was back in a seaworthy condition, though tests of her propulsion system were necessary before she would be able to get underway. Heavy fighting between British and Italian forces during the Mediterranean Campaign delayed Dunkerque's return to France until February 1942. Escorted by five destroyers and some 65 aircraft, she arrived in Toulon on 20 February and was later drydocked there in June to begin repairs.

==== Scuttling at Toulon ====
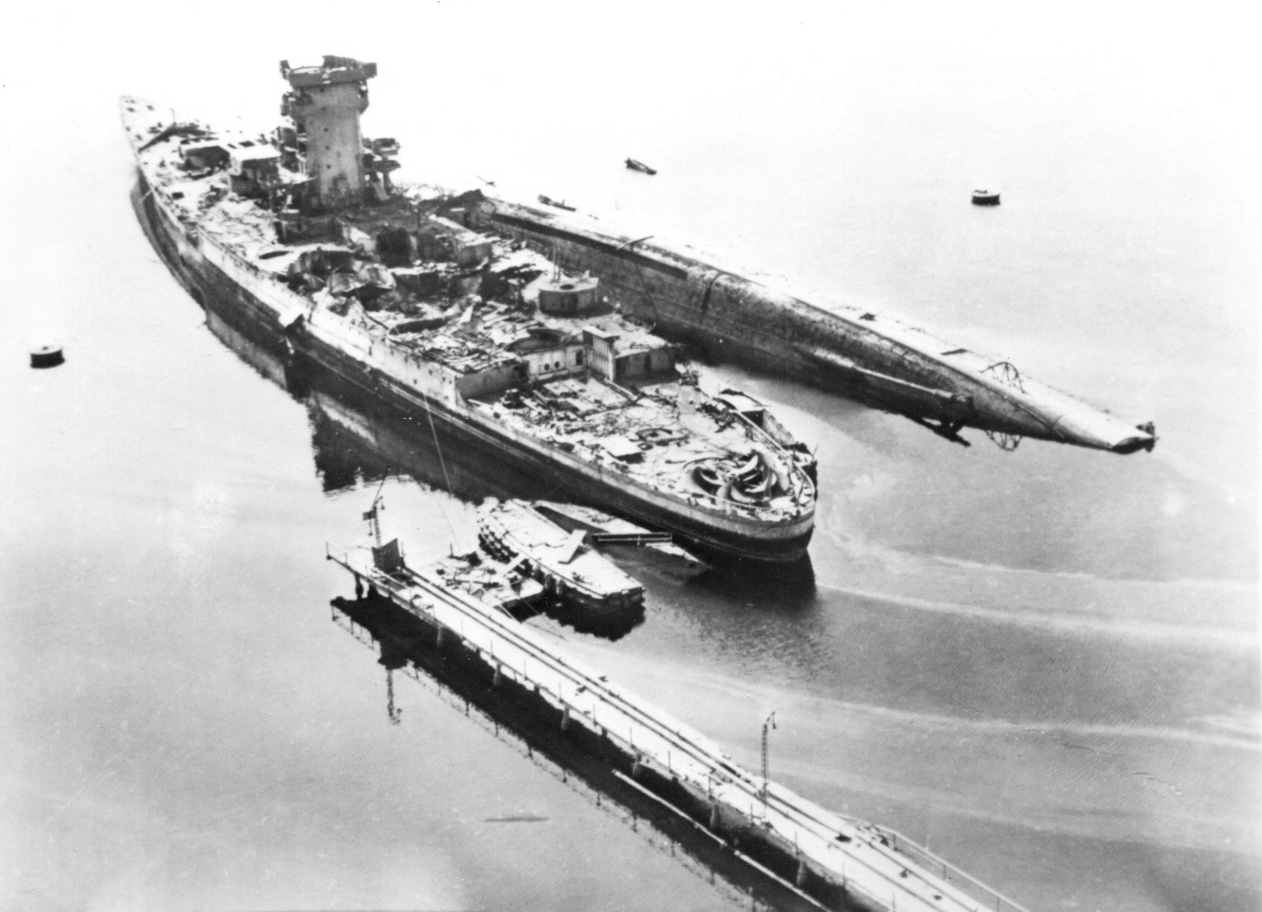
Strasbourg after having been bombed by US Air Force bombers on 18 August 1944

Following Operation Torch, the Allied invasion of French North Africa on 8 November, Germany launched Case Anton in retaliation, moving to seize all of the so-called "Zone libre", the part of Vichy France that had up to that point remained unoccupied. Expecting the Germans to arrive to commandeer the ships, de Laborde ordered his crews to prepare to scuttle their ships. When the Germans arrived in Toulon on 27 November, the work had been completed and de Laborde issued the order. Sabotage teams went through the ships, destroying any equipment that might be usable by the Germans, including rangefinders, gyrocompasses, and radios. They lit fires in the boilers and shut off the water supply so that the boilers would overheat and explode, and they packed gun barrels with explosives. Strasbourg's crew then opened the seacocks and detonated scuttling charges to ensure the ship sank. Dunkerque was at that time still incomplete in the drydock, so she was set on fire, damaged by demolition charges, and then flooded in the drydock when the locks were opened.

Italy received control over most of the wrecks, as Germany had little interest; the Italian fleet sought as many vessels as possible, but Dunkerque and Strasbourg were too badly damaged to be repaired quickly, and so they wrote them off as a total loss. To prevent the French from repairing them in the future, the Italians inflicted further damage on the wrecks, including cutting their main-battery guns. They then began breaking up both vessels, but after the Italian surrender in September 1943, the Germans reasserted control over the port. The Germans then turned Strasbourg back to Vichy control, who placed the ship in a state of conservation in the Bay of Lazaret, hoping to repair the ship after the war. She was then bombed and sunk again by American aircraft after Operation Dragoon, the Allied invasion of southern France. Dunkerque was also bombed several times in the final years of the war.

After falling under Free French control in October 1944, Strasbourg was raised again but by that point was beyond repairing. Instead, she was retained as a target for underwater weapons tests. Little else was done with either wreck for more than a decade; in March 1955, Strasbourg was condemned and renamed Q45 before being sold for scrap in May. Dunkerque became Q56 in September but remained extant until September 1958, when she, too, was sold to ship breakers.
