= 330mm/50 Modèle 1931 gun =

330mm/50 Modèle 1931
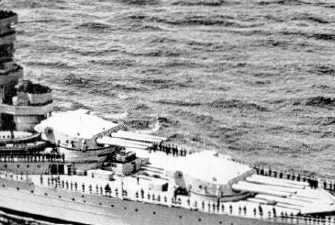
- Main guns of the Dunkerque
- Type: Naval gun
- Place of origin: France

Service history
- Used by: France
- Wars: Second World War

Specifications
- Mass: 70 tonnes (69 long tons; 77 short tons)
- Barrel length: 16.645 m (54 ft 7.3 in) L/50 (calibers)
- Shell: separate charges and shell
- Calibre: 330-millimetre (13 in)
- Rate of fire: 1.5 - 2 rounds per minute
- Maximum firing range: 41.700 m with SAP, 40.600 m with HE

The 330mm/50 Modèle 1931 gun was a heavy naval gun of the French Navy.

The built-up gun was carried by the Dunkerque-class fast battleships, in quadruple turrets inspired by those intended for the Normandie class. They had one of the longest ranges, while firing quite powerful projectiles: APC – 560 kg (1,230 lb) and HE – 552 kg (1,217 lb). The range was over 40 km in both cases; the trajectory was flat. Dunkerque's guns were affected by inaccuracy caused by their quadruple mounts (too close together), but could engage German battleships of the Scharnhorst class with enough power to pierce their armour: at 0 metres, the shell could pierce 713 mm (28.1 in), at 23 km (14 mi) penetration capability was 342 mm (13.5 in) and 292 mm (11.5 in) at 27.5 km (17.1 mi). Theoretically, it could pierce Scharnhorst's 320 mm belt at over 20 km. Given the flat trajectory, the deck perforation was less impressive, but still 105 mm at 23 km and 110 mm at 27.5 km. Therefore, the armour-piercing capability was very near that of the best battleship guns, at least at medium to short range. The armour-piercing capability of Scharnhorst's guns varied from 604 to 205 mm in the same range (0-27.5 km), so they were weaker weapons. However, Dunkerque had a weaker armour belt, so the deadly range of the German battleships was not inferior. The battleship Strasbourg had thicker armour (283 vs. 241 mm) and this reduced the useful range to only about 18 km. The deck perforation was always in favour of the 330 mm gun, the 280 mm gun being unable to pierce more than 76 mm at 27.5 km.

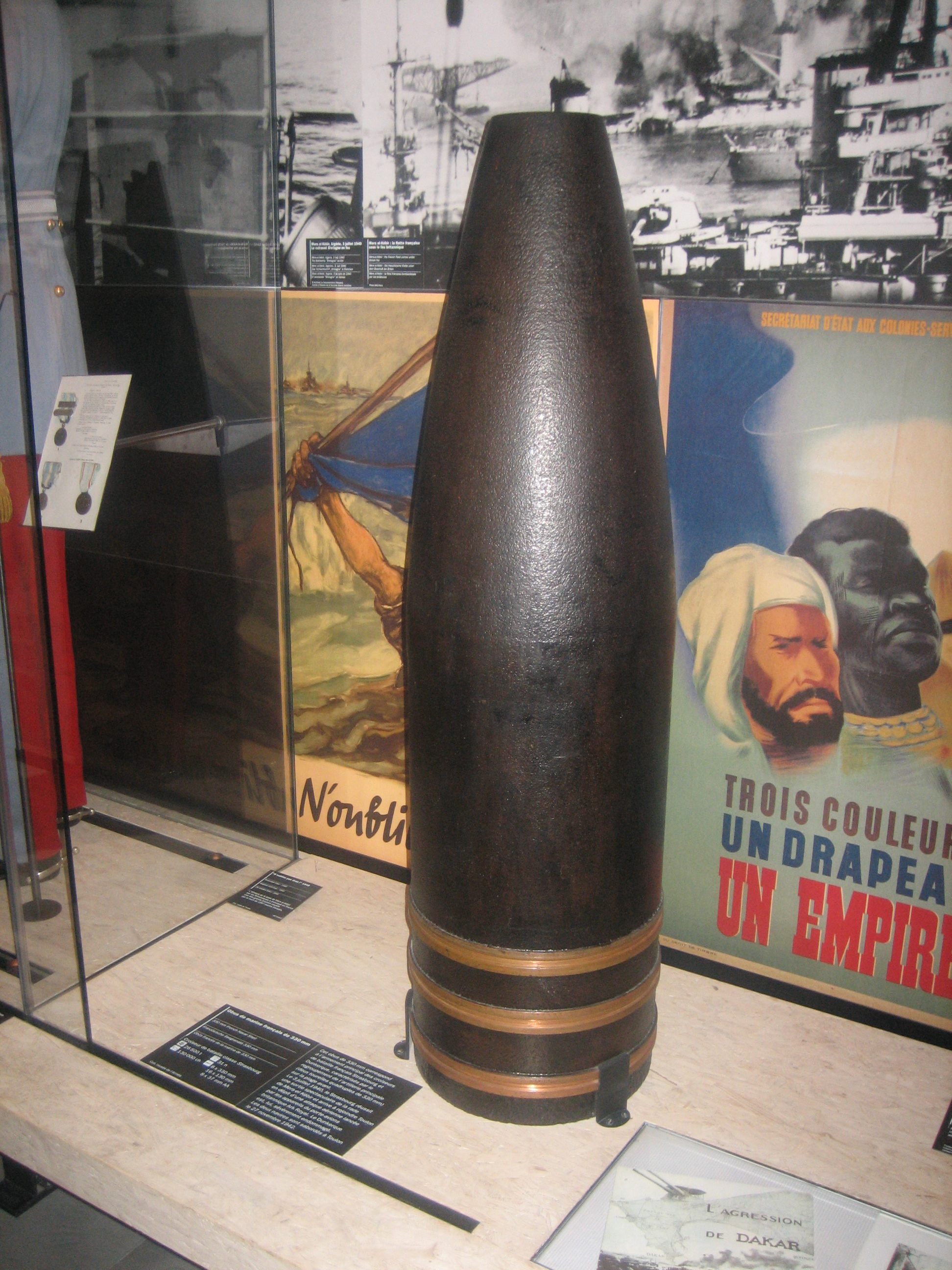
Shell on display at the Army Museum at Les Invalides

The 330 mm guns had many faults. They were complex and moved with a weak system for such 1,500 t (1,500 long tons; 1,700 short tons) turrets (roughly the weight of an Italian 381 mm triple turret). They had two 100 hp engines (but only one was typically used). Despite the great range, elevation was only 35° (therefore the gun had a very high muzzle velocity of 870 m/s). The guns were coupled in two twin arrangement, sleeved in pairs. The turrets were heavily protected, and internally had a 25–40 mm bulkhead to separate the two twin mounts. This was important at Mers-El-Kébir, where a 381 mm shell hit Dunkerque in one of her turrets: the projectile penetrated the roof and killed everyone in the semi-turret, but the other pair of guns continued to operate.

The later 380mm/45 Modèle 1935 gun essentially enlarged the design.
