= Lyon-class battleship =

1913 proposed French Navy battleship group

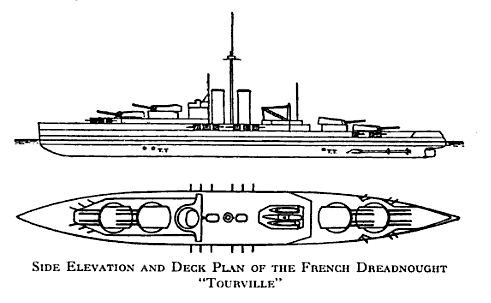
- Plan and port-side elevation drawing of the Lyon class as depicted in the Journal of United States Artillery

Class overview
- Operators: French Navy
- Preceded by: Normandie class
- Succeeded by: Dunkerque class
- Planned: 4
- Completed: 0

General characteristics
- Type: Dreadnought battleship
- Displacement: 29,600 t (29,133 long tons)
- Length: 190 m (623 ft 4 in) (p/p); 194.5 m (638 ft 1 in) (o/a)
- Beam: 29 m (95 ft 2 in)
- Draft: 8.65 to 9.2 m (28 ft 5 in to 30 ft 2 in)
- Installed power: 40,000 CV (39,000 shp)
- Propulsion: 4 shafts; Mixed steam turbines and triple-expansion steam engines or all-turbine systems
- Speed: 21 knots (39 km/h; 24 mph)
- Armament: 4 × quadruple 34 cm (13.4 in) guns; 24 × single 138.6 mm (5.5 in) guns; 2 × single 47 mm (1.9 in) AA guns; 6 × torpedo tubes (submerged)
- Armor: Waterline belt: 300 mm (11.8 in); Deck: 42 or 70 mm (1.7 or 2.8 in); Gun turrets: 300 mm (11.8 in)

The Lyon class was a set of battleships planned for the French Navy (Marine nationale) in 1913, with construction scheduled to begin in 1915. The class was to have consisted of four ships, named Lyon, Lille, Duquesne, and Tourville. The first two were named for the French cities of Lyon and Lille, and the latter pair honored the French admirals Abraham Duquesne and Anne Hilarion de Tourville. The Lyon class' design was an improvement on the previous Normandie class, utilizing a fourth quadruple-gun turret to mount a total of sixteen 34 cm (13.4 in) guns. Construction on the Lyons was cancelled due to the August 1914 outbreak of World War I, before any of the ships were laid down.

== Design ==
An artist's depiction of the Normandie class, which provided the basis for the Lyon design

The French Navy began a dreadnought battleship construction program in 1910 with the four ships of the Courbet class. Two years later, the National Assembly passed a naval law which called for a fleet of twenty-eight battleships by 1920. Under this plan, three ships would be ordered in 1912; these became the Bretagne class. Two more were projected for 1913 and another two for 1914, which were to be the first four Normandie-class battleships, though an amendment to the law increased the pace of construction to four Normandies in 1913 and a fifth of the same design in 1914. Four ships were projected for 1915. Design work on the vessels to follow the Normandies began in 1912; the design staff submitted several proposals for the new battleships, with displacements ranging from 27,000 metric tons (26,574 long tons) to 29,000 t (28,542 long tons). In 1913, the Navy authorized a fourth class of battleships, what was to have been the Lyon class, and scheduled their construction for 1915.

One of the main considerations for the new design was the armament to be carried. The French were aware that the latest British battleships—the Queen Elizabeth class—were to be armed with 38 cm (15 in) guns, prompting significant consideration of matching this caliber for the Lyon design. The design staff prepared four variants, two armed with the standard French 34 cm gun in twin or quadruple gun turrets, and two armed with 38 cm guns in twin turrets. The designers also briefly considered a ship armed with twenty 30.5 cm (12 in) guns in quadruple turrets, but the smaller gun caliber was deemed to be insufficient and it was quickly rejected. At the time, the French Navy believed that at the expected battle ranges in the Mediterranean, the 34 cm gun was effective and so the larger 38 cm gun was not necessary. The design staff determined the 38 cm gun would take too long to design, so the proposals that incorporated these weapons were rejected and officials chose between the two 34 cm proposals. The first proposal, which mounted fourteen guns, was a 27,500-metric-ton (27,066-long-ton) ship 185 meters (607 ft) long. On 24 November 1913, the design staff instead chose the slightly larger second design, armed with sixteen guns in four quadruple turrets, but the specific 34 cm gun to be used to arm the ships was still undecided.

The first proposal by the Directorate of Artillery (Direction de l'artillerie) was for the existing 45-caliber (Note: In this case, "caliber" refers to the length of the gun expressed in terms of the barrel diameter; a 45-caliber gun is 45 times long as it is in diameter.) gun used by the Bretagne and Normandie-class ships to be modified to use a slightly longer shell that weighed 590 kg (1,300 lb), 50 kg (110 lb) more than the existing shell, and was optimized for underwater performance. The second proposal was for a 50-caliber gun that fired a larger 630 kg (1,390 lb) shell. Accommodating the extra volume and weight of the longer gun was estimated to increase the displacement of the design to 31,000–32,000 t (31,000–31,000 long tons) and to increase the cost from 87 million francs to 93–96 million. The first option was ultimately selected in February 1914. The first two ships, Lyon and Lille, were scheduled to be ordered on 1 January 1915, and Duquesne and Tourville would have followed on 1 April.

The run-up to and beginning of World War I led to the end of the Lyon class. The French government mobilized its reserve forces in July, a month before the conflict, and thereby stripped its shipyards of many of the specialized tradesmen required for constructing the ships. The French also redirected their industrial capacity to weapons and munition orders from the army. In light of such constraints, the navy decided that only those ships that could be completed quickly would be worked upon, such as the Bretagnes.

=== Ships ===
Construction data
Ship	Builder
Lyon	Ateliers et Chantiers de la Loire, St Nazaire
Duquesne	Arsenal de Brest, Brest
Lille	Forges et Chantiers de la Méditerranée, La Seyne
Tourville	Arsenal de Lorient, Lorient

=== Characteristics ===
The ships would have been 190 m (623 ft 4 in) long between perpendiculars and 194.5 m (638 ft 1 in) long overall. They would have had a beam of 29 m (95 ft 2 in) and a draft of 8.65 to 9.2 m (28 ft 5 in to 30 ft 2 in). Their displacement was estimated at 29,600 metric tons (29,100 long tons). The propulsion system had not been settled by the time the class was cancelled; the design staff proposed either the mixed steam turbine and triple-expansion engine system used in the first four ships of the preceding Normandie class or the all-turbine system used in the last Normandie-class ship, Béarn, in a memo dated 13 September 1913. They also considered new geared turbines that had proved satisfactory in the new destroyer Enseigne Gabolde. The final design called for a propulsion system rated at 40,000 metric horsepower (39,000 shp) with a top speed of 21 knots (39 km/h; 24 mph). An unknown number of boilers were to be trunked into two funnels amidships.

The main battery of the Lyons would have been sixteen 34 cm Modèle 1912M guns mounted in four quadruple-gun turrets. They would have all been mounted on the centerline, although the arrangement is not clear. A preliminary sketch, attached to the design staff's memo of 19 September 1913, showed one turret was placed forward, one amidships, and two in a superfiring pair aft, although the contemporary Journal of United States Artillery suggests the turrets would have been mounted in two superfiring pairs, forward and aft. The turrets weighed 1,500 t (1,500 long tons), and were electrically trained and hydraulically elevated. The guns were divided into pairs and mounted in twin cradles; a 40 mm (1.6 in) thick bulkhead divided the turrets. Each pair of guns had its own ammunition hoist and magazine. They could be fired simultaneously or independently. Before work on the Lyon class had started, the French Navy had begun experimenting with new types of shells. After learning that shells had penetrated the hulls of battleships underwater to burst below their armored belts during the Battle of the Yellow Sea in 1904 and during British gunnery trials in 1907, the French Navy began investigating how they might optimize shell design to improve their performance through the water. By 1913 the navy believed that it had a design that could be accurate through the water for a distance of 100 meters (328 ft).

The secondary armament was to consist of twenty-four guns, either the 55-caliber 138.6 mm Modèle 1910 or a new automatic model, each singly-mounted in casemates in the hull sides. The M1910 guns fired a 36.5 kg (80 lb) shell at a muzzle velocity of 830 m/s (2,700 ft/s). The ships would also have been equipped with a pair of 47 mm (1.9 in) anti-aircraft guns and six submerged torpedo tubes of unknown size.

The ships would have been protected with a modified version of the armor layout of the earlier Normandie class. The primary alteration was that the upper strake of armor intended to protect the secondary armament was reduced from 160 millimeters (6.3 in) on the Normandies to 100 millimeters (3.9 in). The reduction compensated for the additional armor below the waterline to better protect the hull against "diving" shells. The waterline armor belt would have been 300 millimeters (11.8 in) thick between the barbettes of the end turrets. The turrets were also intended to be protected with an armor thickness of 300 millimeters on their faces. The lower armored deck would have consisted of a total of 42 millimeters (1.7 in) of mild steel; the deck sloped downwards to meet the bottom of the waterline belt and the sloped portion of the deck would have had a total thickness of 70 millimeters (2.8 in). The upper armored deck was intended to be 40 millimeters (1.6 in). Between the end barbettes, below the waterline belt, the thickness of the hull would have graduated from 80 to 35 millimeters (3.1 to 1.4 in) in thickness down to a depth of 6 meters (19 ft 8 in) below the waterline forward and 4.5 meters (14 ft 9 in) aft.
