= Marcel-Bruno Gensoul =

French admiral (1880–1973)

- Born: 12 October 1880; Montpellier, France
- Died: 30 December 1973 (aged 93); Paris, France
- Military career
- Allegiance: France
- Branch: French Navy
- Conflicts: Mers-el-Kebir

Marcel-Bruno Gensoul (12 October 1880 – 30 December 1973) was a French admiral.

== Life ==
Gensoul was born on 12 October 1880 in Montpellier. His father was a local magistrate. In 1898, he entered the École navale (French Naval Academy) in 1898.

=== Second World War ===
He commanded the Force de Raid, based at Brest until the Armistice of 22 June 1940. The force was then transferred to Mers El Kébir in French North Africa. Gensoul was upset at the armistice, feeling the "defeat of his country as a deep personal humiliation."

As Vice Admiral, Gensoul was subsequently involved in abortive negotiations with British Admiral James Somerville that culminated in the bombardment and attack on Mers-el-Kébir on 3 July 1940. Admiral Gensoul had initially refused to see a British representative on the morning of July 3, 1940, because he thought the British were merely trying to intimidate him. However, he later, after recognising the seriousness of the situation, agreed to see Captain Cedric Holland, the British representative on the French battleship Dunkerque but could not agree to the British choices intending to prevent the ships from falling into German control. Gensoul stated that any “force would be met with force." He then received a message from French Naval Headquarters which supported his defiant response. As soon as Holland cleared the harbour onboard HMS Foxhound Admiral Somerville ordered his fleet Force H to open fire, severely damaging the French fleet. Gensoul's ship was badly damaged but was prevented from sinking by being deliberately run aground in shallow water. Gensoul survived the attack and was promoted by the Vichy government to the full rank of Admiral.

=== Death ===
He died 30 December 1973 in Paris.
