= French submarine Vénus (1935) =

1935 Minerve-class submarine

History

France
- Name: Vénus
- Namesake: Venus
- Builder: Chantiers Worms, Rouen
- Laid down: 27 June 1932
- Launched: 6 April 1935
- Commissioned: 15 November 1936
- Fate: Scuttled, 27 November 1942, scrapped 1951

General characteristics
- Type: Submarine
- Displacement: 662 long tons (673 t) surfaced; 856 long tons (870 t) submerged
- Length: 68.1 m (223 ft 5 in)
- Beam: 5.6 m (18 ft 4 in)
- Draught: 4 m (13 ft 1 in)
- Propulsion: 2 × Vickers-Normand diesel engines, 1,800 bhp (1,342 kW); 2 × Electric motors, 1,230 shp (917 kW)
- Speed: 14.2 knots (26.3 km/h; 16.3 mph) surfaced; 9 knots (17 km/h; 10 mph) submerged
- Range: 2,000 nmi (3,700 km; 2,300 mi) at 10 knots (19 km/h; 12 mph) surfaced; 85 nmi (157 km; 98 mi) at 5 knots (9.3 km/h; 5.8 mph) submerged
- Test depth: 80 m (260 ft)
- Complement: 42
- Armament: 1 × 75 mm (3 in)/35 Model 1928 deck gun with 150 rounds; 2 × 13.2 mm (0.52 in) AA machine guns; 6 × 550 mm (21.7 in) internal torpedo tubes (4 bow/2 stern) with 12 torpedoes; 3 × 400 mm (15.7 in) external torpedo tubes

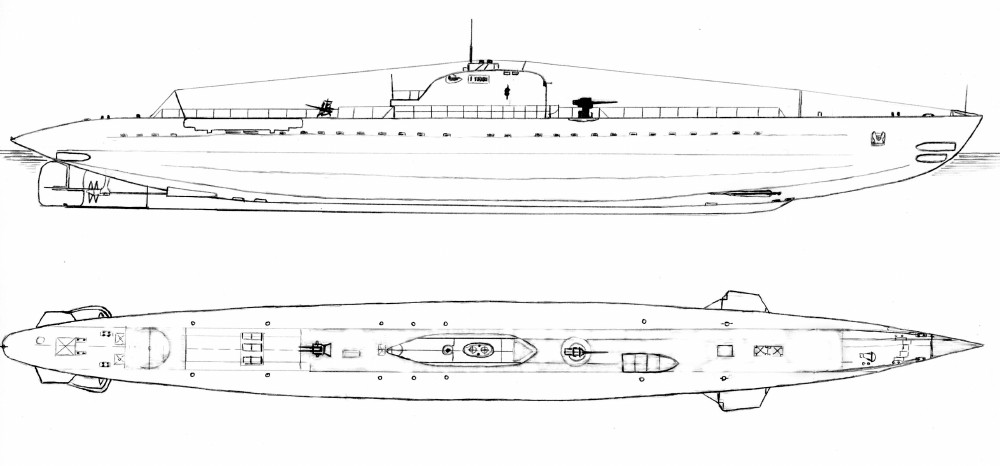
schematic drawing of the submarine

Vénus (Q187) was a Minerve-class submarine of the French Navy, commissioned in 1936, and scuttled at Toulon in November 1942.

== Service history ==
The submarine was laid down on 27 June 1932 at the Chantiers Worms shipyard at Rouen, launched on 6 April 1935, and commissioned on 15 November 1936 into the 5e Escadrille de Sous-Marins (5th Submarine Squadron), and served in the 15ème Division de Sous-Marins (15th Submarine Division) at Toulon from 1937.

On 10 January 1940, during World War II, she left Toulon for Oran, and patrolled the French West Indies, returning to France on 3 June 1940. After France surrendered to Germany in June 1940, Vénus served with the navy of Vichy France. By February 1941 she was part of a group of submarines based at Casablanca, French Morocco, and from July 1941 to February 1942 was at Dakar, Senegal. She then returned to Toulon.

On 27 November 1942, following the German occupation of Vichy, the fleet at Toulon were ordered to scuttle their ships, but Vénus was one of five submarines (the others were Casabianca, Marsouin, Glorieux, and Iris) that disobeyed and attempted to escape, sailing from the harbour while avoiding minefields and German bombers. The other submarines escaped, but Vénus was scuttled in the entrance of Toulon Harbour.

The wreck was salvaged in 1951 and scrapped.

== See also ==
- List of submarines of France
