= Scuttling =

Act of deliberately sinking a ship by allowing water to flow into the hull

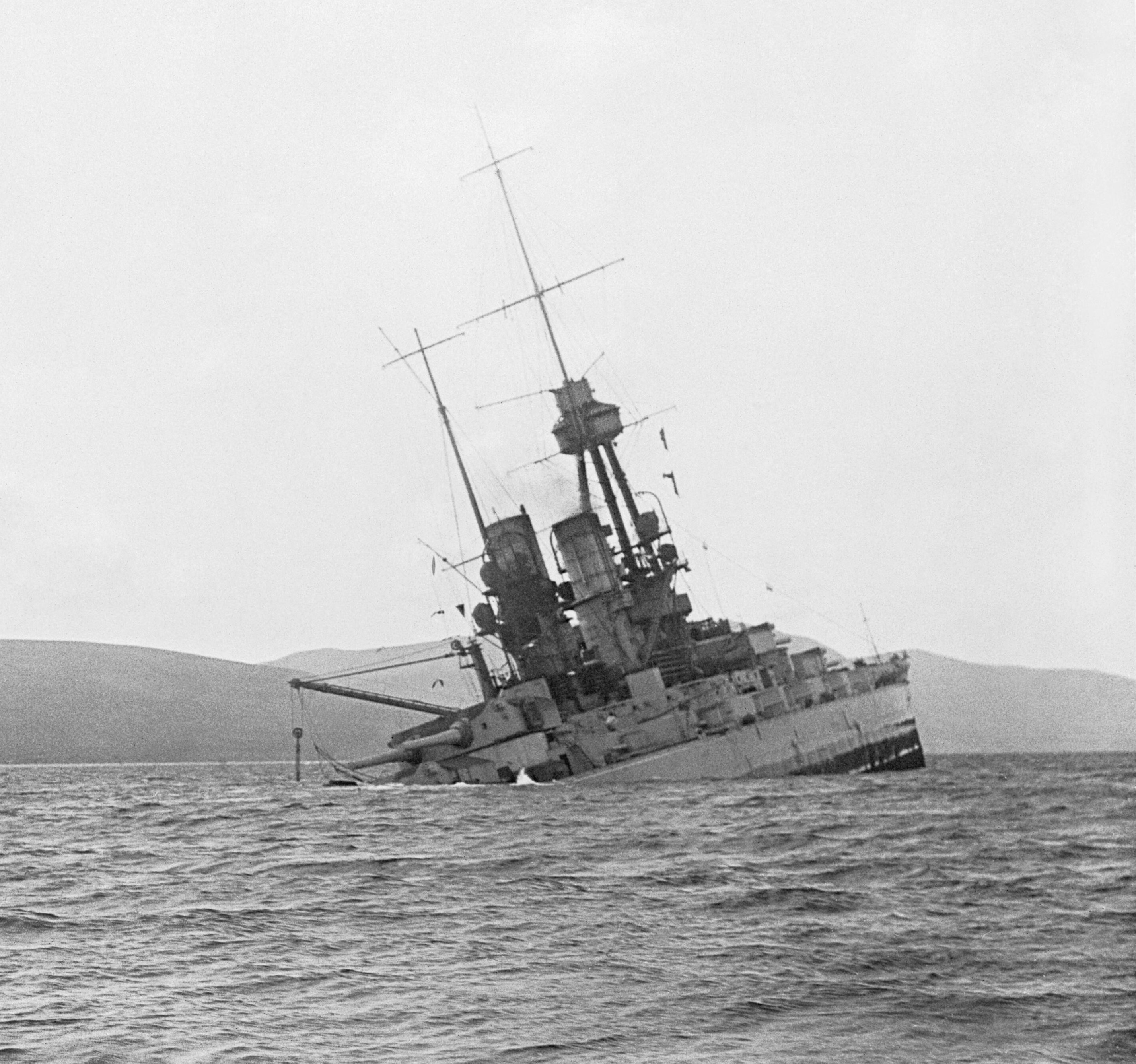
The battleship SMS Bayern sinking during the Scuttling of the German fleet at Scapa Flow in June 1919

Scuttling is the act of deliberately sinking a ship by allowing water to flow into the hull, typically by its crew opening holes in its hull.

Scuttling may be performed to dispose of an abandoned, old, or captured vessel; to prevent the vessel from becoming a navigation hazard; as an act of self-destruction to prevent the ship from being captured by an enemy force; as a blockship to restrict navigation through a channel or within a harbor; to provide an artificial reef for divers and marine life; or to alter the flow of rivers.

== Notable historical examples ==
=== Skuldelev ships (around 1070) ===
The Skuldelev ships, five Viking ships, were sunk to prevent attacks from the sea on the Danish city of Roskilde. The scuttling blocked a major waterway, redirecting ships to a smaller one that required considerable local knowledge.

=== Cog near Kampen (early 15th century) ===
In 2012, a cog preserved from the keel up to the decks in the silt was discovered alongside two smaller vessels in the river IJssel in the city of Kampen, in the Netherlands. The ship, dating from the early 15th century, was suspected to have been deliberately sunk into the river to influence its current.

=== Hernán Cortés (1519) ===
The Spanish conquistador Hernán Cortés, who led the expedition that resulted in the fall of the Aztec Empire, ordered his men to strip and scuttle his fleet to prevent the secretly planned return to Cuba by those loyal to Cuban Governor Diego Velázquez de Cuéllar. Their success would have halted his inland march and conquest of the Aztec Empire.

=== HMS Sapphire (1696) ===
HMS Sapphire was a 32-gun, fifth-rate sailing frigate of the Royal Navy in Newfoundland Colony to protect the English migratory fishery. The vessel was trapped in Bay Bulls harbour by four French naval vessels led by Jacques-François de Brouillan. To avoid its capture, the English scuttled the vessel on 11 September 1696.

=== HMS Endeavour (1778) ===
HMS Endeavour was Captain James Cook's ship upon which he travelled to Australia. After being sold into private hands, she was finally scuttled in a blockade of Narragansett Bay, Rhode Island in 1778.

=== Siege of Yorktown (1781) ===
The British sank one ship on 10 October 1781 to prevent it from being captured by the French fleet. Furthermore, the York River, while protected by the French Navy, also contained a few scuttled ships, which were meant to serve as a blockade should any British ships enter the river.

=== HMS Bounty (1790) ===
HMS Bounty, after her crew mutinied, was scuttled by the mutineers in Bounty Bay off Pitcairn Island on 23 January 1790.

=== Chesapeake Bay Flotilla (1814) ===
During the War of 1812, Commodore Joshua Barney, of the U.S. Navy, Chesapeake Bay Flotilla, sank all nineteen of his fighting vessels, to prevent them from being captured by the British, as he and his men marched, inland, in the unsuccessful defense of Washington D.C.

=== Jan van Speyk (1831) ===
During the Belgian Revolution, Dutch gunboat commander Jan van Speyk had his ship boarded by a mob of Antwerp labourers. When they tried to force him and his crew to surrender, he ignited a barrel of gunpowder, thereby blowing up his ship and killing himself along with most of the ship's crew and the mob. Van Speyk went on to become a national hero in the Netherlands.

=== Russian Black Sea Fleet in Sevastopol (1854) ===
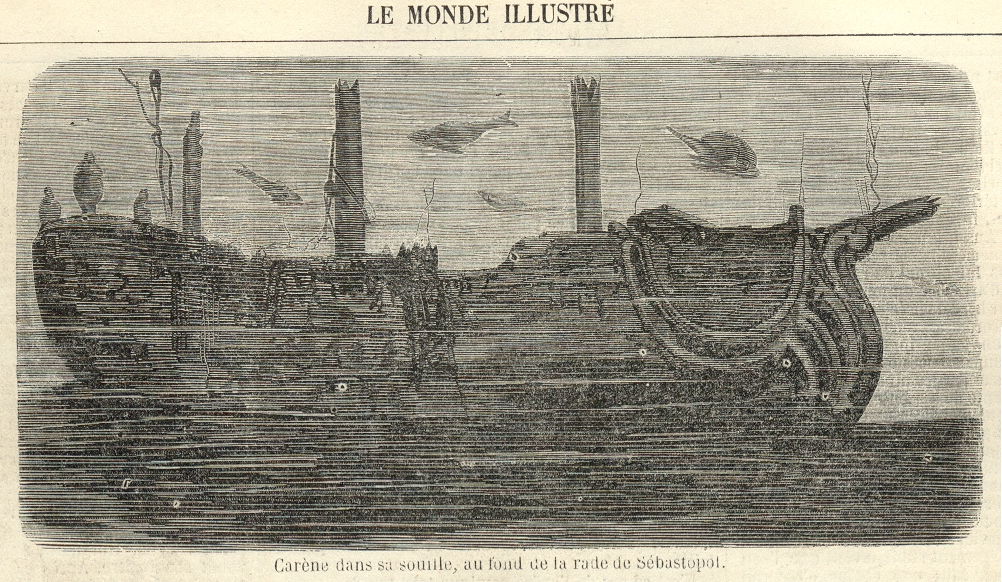
A sunken ship at Sevastopol, 1858

During the Crimean War, in anticipation of the siege of Sevastopol, the Russians scuttled ships of the Black Sea Fleet to protect the harbour, to use their naval cannon as additional artillery, and to free up the ships' crews as marines. Those ships that were deliberately sunk included Grand Duke Constantine, City of Paris (both with 120 guns), Brave, Empress Maria, and Chesme.

=== The Clotilda ===
The Clotilda (slave ship) (often misspelled Clotilde) was the last known U.S. slave ship to bring captives from Africa to the United States, arriving at Mobile Bay, in autumn 1859 or on 9 July 1860, with 110 African men, women, and children. The ship was a two-masted schooner, 86 feet (26 m) long with a beam of 23 ft (7.0 m). U.S. involvement in the Atlantic slave trade had been banned by Congress through the Act Prohibiting Importation of Slaves enacted on 2 March 1807 (effective 1 January 1808), but the practice continued illegally, especially through slave traders based in New York in the 1850s and early 1860. In the case of the Clotilda, the voyage's sponsors were based in the South and planned to buy Africans in Kingdom of Whydah, Dahomey. After the voyage, the ship was burned and scuttled in Mobile Bay in an attempt to destroy the evidence.

=== USS Merrimack/CSS Virginia (1861) ===
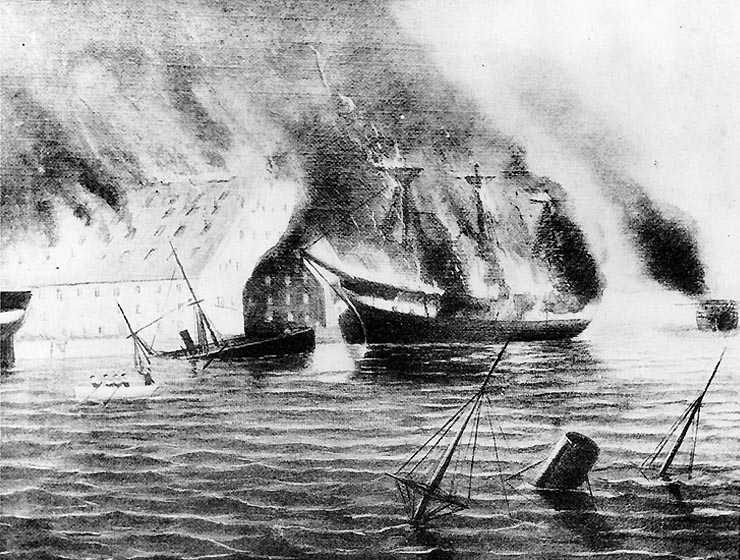
Merrimack alight on 20 April 1861

In April 1861, the United States Navy steam frigate USS Merrimack was among several ships Union forces set afire or scuttled at the Gosport Navy Yard (now Norfolk Naval Shipyard) in Portsmouth, Virginia, to keep them from falling into Confederate hands at the outbreak of the American Civil War. The unsuccessful attempt at scuttling Merrimack enabled the Confederate States Navy to raise and rebuild her as the broadside ironclad CSS Virginia. Shortly after her famous engagement with the U.S Navy monitor USS Monitor in the Battle of Hampton Roads in March 1862, the Confederates scuttled Virginia to keep her from being captured by Union forces.

=== Stone Fleet (1861–1862) ===
In December 1861 and January 1862, Union forces scuttled a number of former whalers and other merchant ships in an attempt to block access to Confederate ports during the American Civil War. Loaded with stone before being scuttled, the scuttled ships were known as the "Stone Fleet". Those scuttled in December 1861 sometimes are called the "First Stone Fleet", while those sunk in January 1862 sometimes are termed the "Second Stone Fleet".

CSS Georgia (1864)

In December 1864 during the Union capture of the Confederate city Savannah, Georgia, the Savannah Navy Squadron destroyed most of its vessels to prevent them being used by the Union. Most notable was the significantly underpowered and mainly stationary floating battery CSS Georgia. Her seacocks were opened by her crew and she sank to the bottom of the river. In 1968 the wreck was rediscovered and was partially raised from 2012-2015.

=== Peruvian fleet at El Callao (1881) ===
During the War of the Pacific, as Chilean troops entered Lima and El Callao, the Peruvian naval officer Germán Astete ordered the whole Peruvian fleet to be scuttled to prevent capture by Chile.

=== USS Merrimac (1898) ===
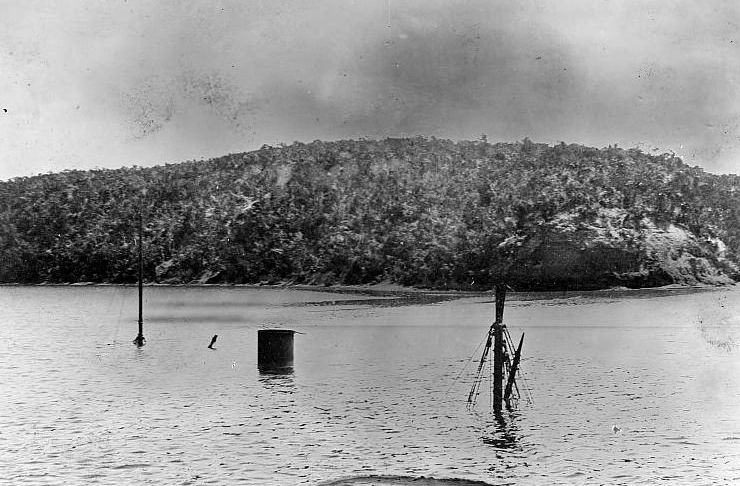
The wreck of USS Merrimac

During the Spanish–American War, a volunteer crew of United States Navy personnel attempted to scuttle the collier USS Merrimac in the entrance to the harbor at Santiago de Cuba in Cuba on the night of 2–3 June 1898 in an attempt to trap the Spanish Navy squadron of Vice Admiral Manuel de la Cámara y Libermoore in port there. The attempt failed when she came under fire by Spanish ships and fortifications and sank without blocking the entrance.

=== Port Arthur (1904–1905) ===
In 1904, during the Russo-Japanese War, the Imperial Japanese Navy made three attempts to block the entrance to the Imperial Russian Navy base at Port Arthur, Manchuria, China, by scuttling transports. Although the Japanese scuttled five transports on 23 February, four on 27 March, and eight on 3 May, none of the attacks succeeded in blocking the entrance. The Russians also scuttled four steamers at the entrance in March 1904 in an attempt to defend the harbor from Japanese intrusion.

During the siege of Port Arthur, the Russians scuttled the surviving ships of their Pacific Squadron that were trapped in port at Port Arthur in late 1904 and early January 1905 to prevent their capture intact by the Japanese.

=== SMS Dresden (1915) ===
In December 1914, SMS Dresden was the only German warship to escape destruction in the Battle of the Falkland Islands. She eluded her British pursuers for several more months, until she put into Más a Tierra in March 1915. Her engines were worn out and she had almost no coal left for her boilers. There, she was trapped by British cruisers, which violated Chilean neutrality and opened fire on the ship. Dresden's Executive Officer – the future Admiral Wilhelm Canaris – negotiated with the British and bought time for his crew to scuttle the Dresden.

=== Zeebrugge Raid (1918) ===
The Zeebrugge Raid involved three outdated British cruisers chosen to serve as blockships in the German-held Belgian port of Bruges-Zeebrugge from which German U-boat operations threatened British shipping. Thetis, Intrepid and Iphigenia were filled with concrete then sent to block a critical canal. Heavy defensive fire caused the Thetis to scuttle prematurely; the other two cruisers sank themselves successfully in the narrowest part of the canal. Within three days, however, the Germans had broken through the western bank of the canal to create a shallow detour for their submarines to move past the blockships at high tide.

=== German fleet at Scapa Flow (1919) ===
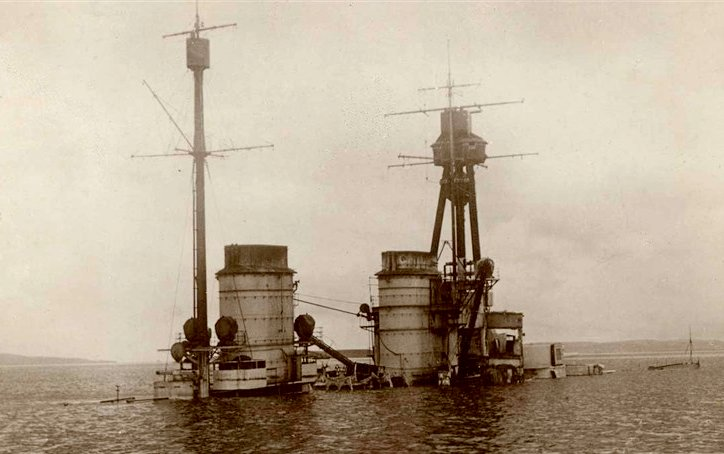
SMS Hindenburg at Scapa Flow

In 1919, over 50 warships of the German High Seas Fleet were scuttled by their crews at Scapa Flow in the north of Scotland, following the deliverance of the fleet as part of the terms of the German surrender. Rear Admiral Ludwig von Reuter ordered the sinkings, denying the majority of the ships to the Allies. Von Reuter was made a prisoner-of-war in Britain but his act of defiance was celebrated in Germany. Though most of the fleet was subsequently salvaged by engineer Ernest Cox, a number of warships (including three battleships) remain, making the area very popular amongst undersea diving enthusiasts.

=== Washington Naval Treaty (1922) ===
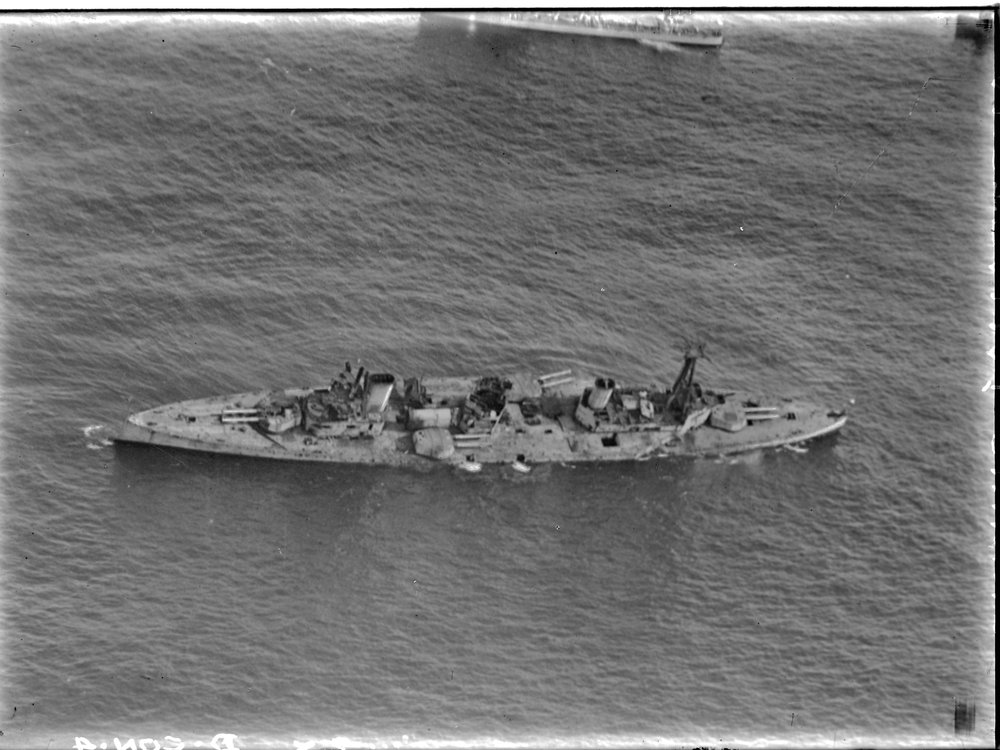
HMAS Australia sinking in the Tasman Sea on 12 April 1924

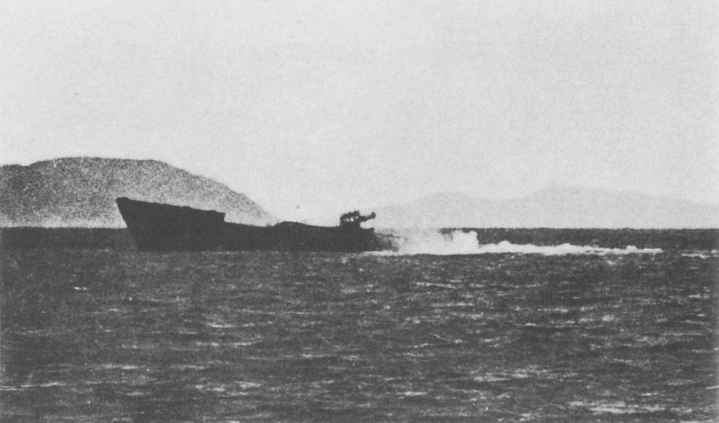
Tosa sinking in the Bungo Channel on 9 February 1925

Under the terms of the Washington Naval Treaty of 1922, the great naval powers were required to limit the size of their battlefleets, resulting in the disposal of some older or incomplete capital ships. During 1924 and 1925, the treaty resulted in the scuttling of the Royal Australian Navy battlecruiser HMAS Australia and the incomplete Imperial Japanese Navy battleship Tosa, while four old Japanese battleships, the Royal Navy battleship HMS Monarch, and the incomplete United States Navy battleship USS Washington (BB-47) all were disposed of as targets.

=== Admiral Graf Spee (1939) ===
Following the Battle of the River Plate the damaged German pocket battleship Admiral Graf Spee sought refuge in the port of Montevideo. On 17 December 1939, with the British and Commonwealth cruisers HMS Ajax, HMS Cumberland, and HMNZS Achilles waiting in international waters outside the mouth of the Río de la Plata, Captain Hans Langsdorff sailed Graf Spee just outside the harbour and scuttled the vessel to avoid risking the lives of his crew in what he expected would be a losing battle. Langsdorff shot himself three days later.

=== San Giorgio at Tobruk (1941) ===
When British and Commonwealth land forces attacked Tobruk on 21 January 1941, the Italian cruiser San Giorgio turned its guns against the attacking force, repelling an attack by tanks. As British forces were entering Tobruk, San Giorgio was scuttled at 4:15 AM on 22 January. San Giorgio was awarded the Gold Medal of Military Valor for her actions in the defence of Tobruk. The ship was salvaged in 1952, but while being towed to Italy, her tow rope failed and she sank in heavy seas.

=== Blockade of Massawa (1941) ===
As the Allies advanced toward Eritrea during their East African Campaign in World War II, Mario Bonetti—the Italian commander of the Red Sea Flotilla based at Massawa—realized that the British would overrun his harbor. In the first week of April 1941, he began to destroy the harbor's facilities and ruin its usefulness to the Allies. Bonetti ordered the sinking of two large floating dry docks and supervised the calculated scuttling of eighteen large commercial ships in the mouths of the north Naval Harbor, the central Commercial Harbor and the main South Harbor. This blocked navigation in and out. He also had a large floating crane scuttled. These actions rendered the harbor useless by 8 April 1941, when Bonetti surrendered it to the British. Scuttled ships included the German steamers Liebenfels, Frauenfels, Lichtenfels, Crefeld, Gera and Oliva. Also scuttled were the Italian steamers Adua, Brenta, Arabia, Romolo Gessi, Vesuvio, XXIII Marzo, Antonia C., Riva Ligure, Clelia Campenella, Prometeo and the Italian tanker Giove. The largest scuttled vessel was the 11,760-ton Colombo, an Italian steamer. Thirteen coastal steamers and small naval vessels were also scuttled.

The British seized the harbor and initiated marine salvage operations under Commander Joseph Stenhouse to restore navigation in and out. Stenhouse was slowed by heat exhaustion but his team refloated the oil tanker Giove; he died in September 1941 when the salvage tug Tai Koo bearing him as a passenger was sunk by a naval mine in the Red Sea. His death left a civilian contractor to open a channel, but this crew made no progress. It was not until a year later that headway was made in the effort to return Massawa to military duties. U.S. Navy Commander Edward Ellsberg arrived in April 1942 with a salvage crew and a small collection of specialized tools and began methodically correcting the damage. His salvage efforts yielded significant results in just 5½ weeks. American divers sealed the hulls underwater, and air was pumped in to float the hulls. The divers defused a booby trap in Brenta, which contained an armed naval mine sitting on three torpedo warheads in the hold. Another danger was Regia Marina minelayer Ostia, which had been sunk by the Royal Air Force with several of its mines still racked. On 8 May 1942, SS Koritza, an armed Greek steamer, had drydocked for cleaning and minor hull repairs. Massawa's first major surface fleet "customer" was HMS Dido, which needed repairs to a heavily damaged stern in mid-August 1942, the beginning of a repair and maintenance period for the war-weary 15th Cruiser Squadron. Many of the harbor's sunken ships were patched by Ellsberg's divers, refloated, repaired and taken into service. Ostia and Brenta were successfully salvaged, despite their armed mines. All of this occurred while the British civil contractor struggled and failed to refloat one ship.

=== Bismarck (1941) ===
In 1941 the battleship Bismarck, heavily damaged by the Royal Navy, leaking fuel, listing, unable to steer and with no effective weapons, but still afloat and with engines running, was scuttled by its crew to avoid capture. This was supported by survivors' reports in Pursuit: the Sinking of the Bismarck, by Ludovic Kennedy, 1974, and by a later examination of the wreck itself by Dr Robert Ballard in 1989. A later, more advanced examination found torpedoes had penetrated the second deck, normally above water, and only possible on an already sinking ship, thus further indicating that scuttling had made the final torpedoing redundant.

=== Coral Sea and Midway (1942) ===
After the Battles of the Coral Sea and Midway, the heavily damaged American aircraft carrier Lexington and the Japanese carriers Hiryū, Sōryū, Akagi, and Kaga were all scuttled to prevent their preservation and use by their respective enemies.

=== French fleet at Toulon (1942) ===
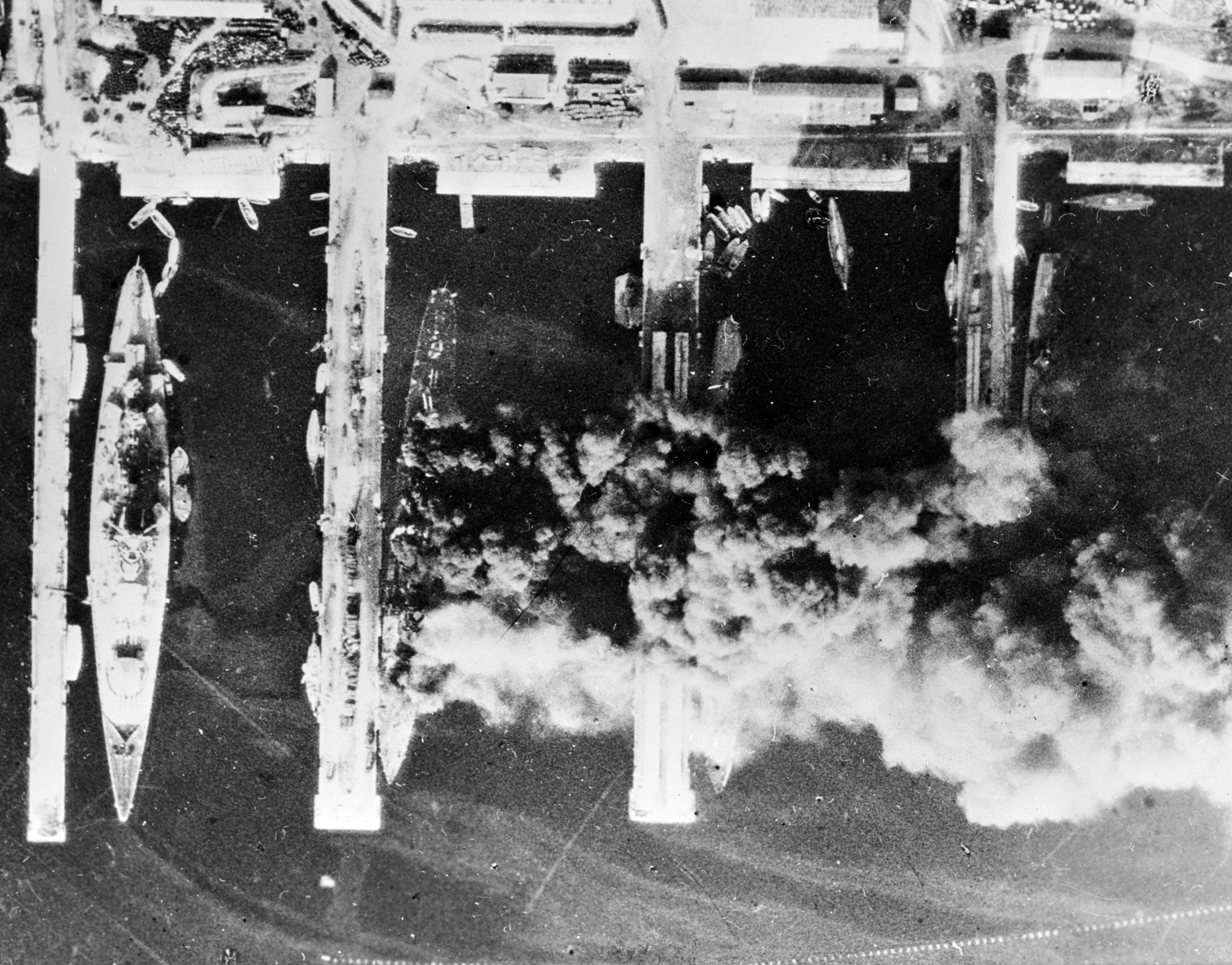
The scuttling of the French fleet, from left to right: Strasbourg, Colbert, Algérie, and Marseillaise

In November 1942, in an operation codenamed Case Anton, Nazi German forces occupied the so-called Free Zone in response to the Allied landing in North Africa. On 27 November they reached Toulon, where the majority of the French Navy was anchored. To avoid capture by the Nazis (Operation Lila) the French admirals-in-command (Laborde and Marquis) decided to scuttle the 230,000-tonne fleet, most notably, the battleships Dunkerque and Strasbourg. Eighty percent of the fleet was utterly destroyed, all of the capital ships proving impossible to repair. Legally the scuttling of the fleet was allowed under the terms of the 1940 Armistice with Germany.

=== Danish fleet (1943) ===
Anticipating a German seizure of all units of the Danish Navy as part of Operation Safari, mostly in Copenhagen but also at other harbours and at sea in Danish waters, the Danish Admiralty had instructed its captains to resist, short of outright fighting, any German attempts to assume control over their vessels, by scuttling if escape to Sweden was not possible and suitable preparations were made. Of the fifty-two vessels in the Danish Navy on 29 August, two were in Greenland, thirty-two were scuttled, four reached Sweden and fourteen were taken undamaged by the Germans. Nine Danish sailors lost their lives and ten were wounded. Subsequently, major parts of the Naval personnel were interned for a period.

=== Allied landing in Normandy (1944) ===
Old ships code-named Corn cobs were sunk to form a protective reef for the Mulberry harbours at Arromanches and Omaha Beach for the Normandy landings. The sheltered waters created by these scuttled ships were called Gooseberries and protected the harbours so transport ships could unload without being hampered by waves.

=== Operation Deadlight (1945–1946) ===
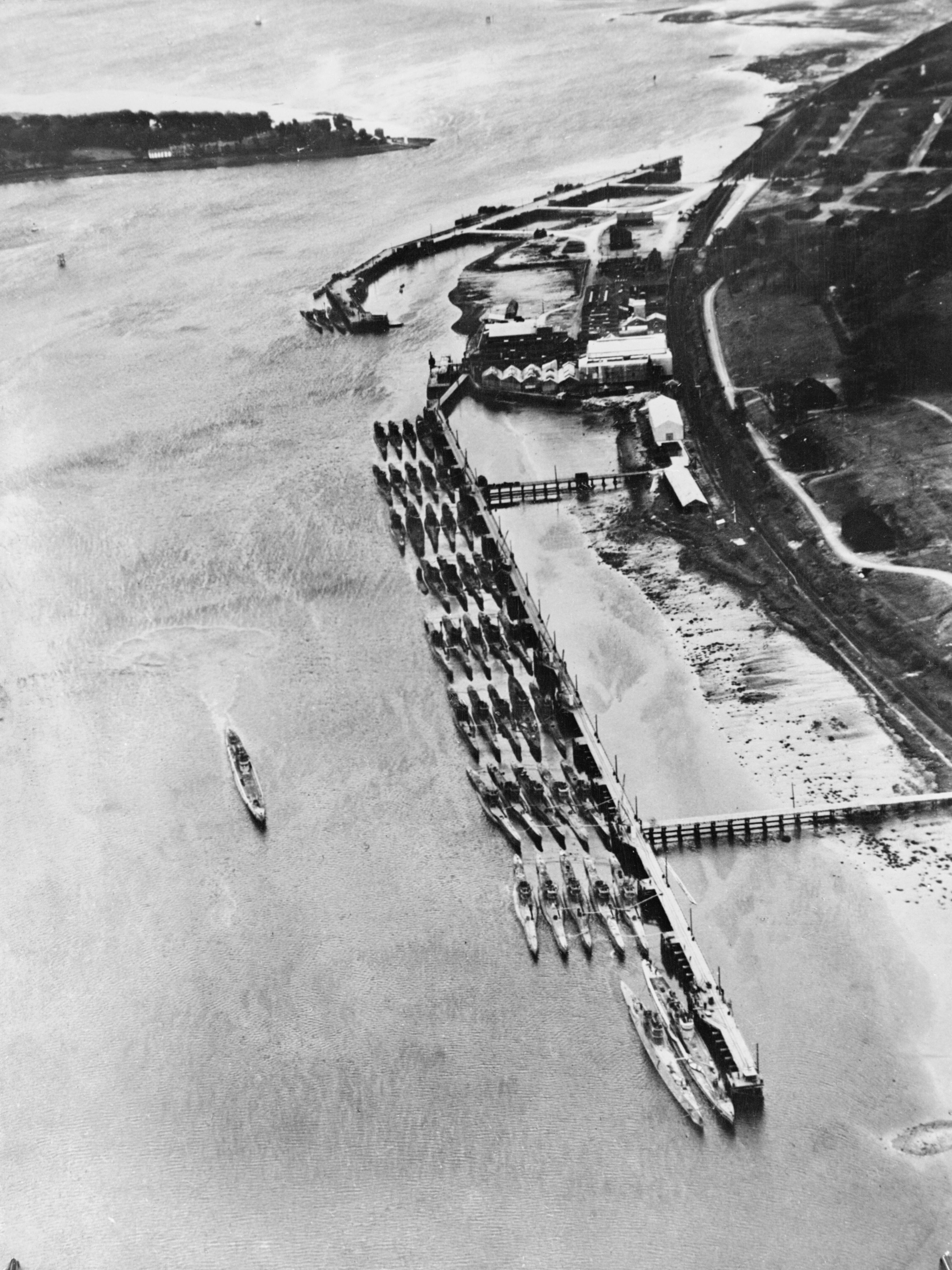
Fifty-two surrendered German submarines await scuttling at Lisahally on 12 June 1945

Of the 156 German submarines ("U-boats") surrendered to the Allies at the end of World War II, 116 were scuttled by the Royal Navy in Operation Deadlight. Plans called for them to be scuttled in three areas in the North Atlantic Ocean west of Ireland, but 56 of the submarines sank before reaching the designated areas due to their poor material condition. Most of the submarines were sunk by gunfire rather than with explosive charges. The first sinking took place on 17 November 1945 and the last on 11 February 1946.

=== Japanese submarines (1946) ===
After Japan's surrender, the United States Navy seized 24 Imperial Japanese Navy submarines, bringing them to Sasebo Bay to study them. To prevent an inspection by a Soviet team, the submarines were scuttled during Operation Road's End.

== Modern era ==
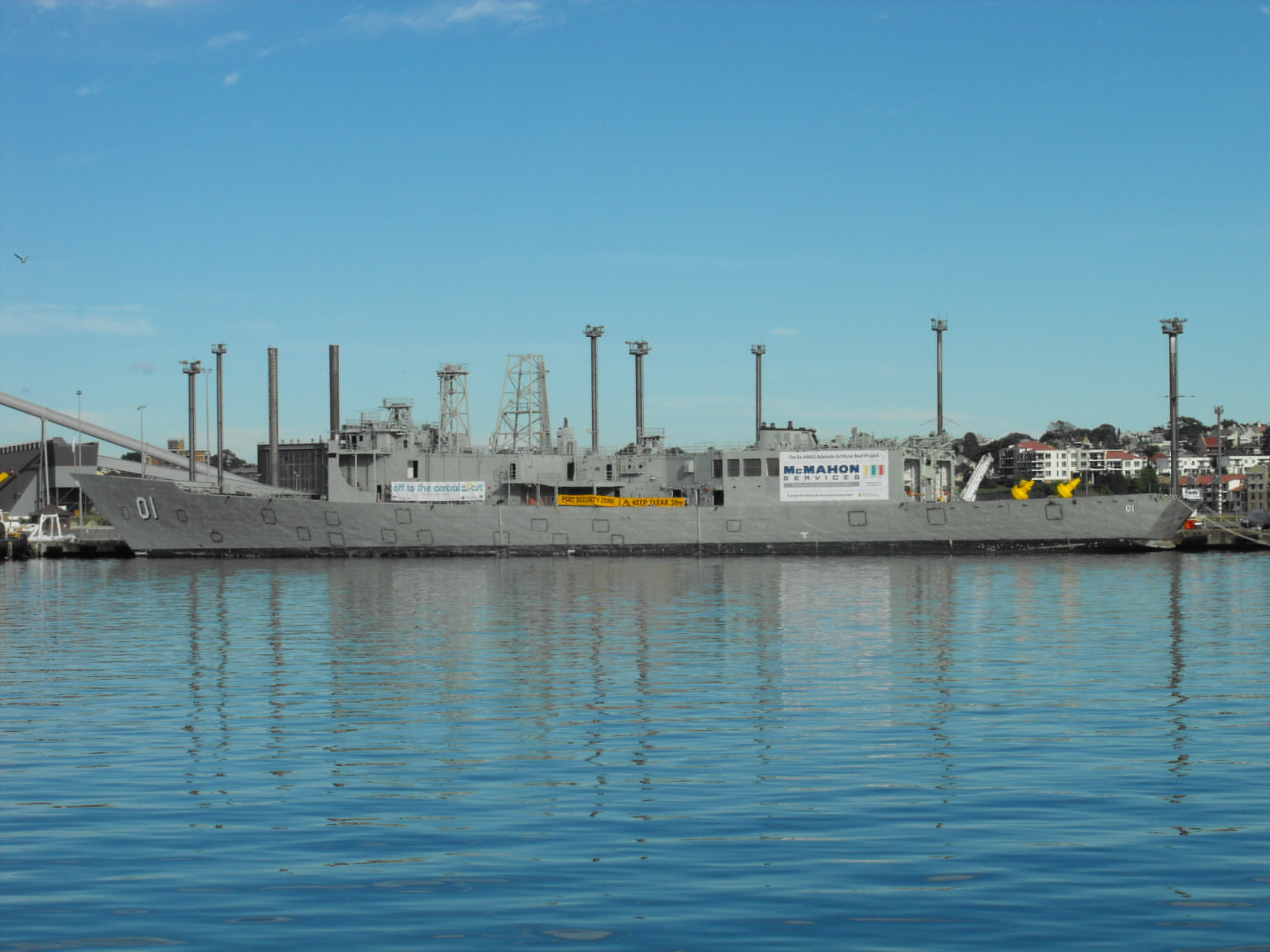
HMAS Adelaide prior to scuttling to be used as an artificial reef

Today, ships (and other objects of similar size) are sometimes sunk to help form artificial reefs, as was done with the former USS Oriskany in 2006. It is also common for military organizations to use old ships as targets, in war games, or for various other experiments. As an example, the decommissioned aircraft carrier USS America was subjected to surface and underwater explosions in 2005 as part of classified research to help design the next generation of carriers (the Gerald R. Ford class), before being sunk with demolition charges.

Ships are increasingly being scuttled as a method of disposal. The economic benefit of scuttling a ship includes removal of ongoing operational expense to keep the vessel seaworthy. Controversy surrounds the practice. The USS Oriskany was scuttled with 700 pounds of PCBs remaining on board as a component in cable insulation, contravening the Stockholm Convention on safe disposal of persistent organic pollutants, which has zero tolerance for PCB dumping in marine environments. The planned scuttling of the Australian frigate HMAS Adelaide at Avoca Beach, New South Wales in March 2010 was placed on hold after resident action groups aired concerns about possible impact on the area's tides and that the removal of dangerous substances from the ship was not thorough enough. Further cleanup work on the hulk was ordered, and despite further attempts to delay, Adelaide was scuttled on 13 April 2011.

Scuttled ships have been used as conveyance for dangerous materials. In the late 1960s, the United States Army scuttled SS Corporal Eric G. Gibson and SS Mormactern with VX nerve gas rockets aboard as part of Operation CHASE — "CHASE" being Pentagon shorthand for "Cut Holes and Sink 'Em." Other ships have been "chased" containing mustard agents, bombs, land mines, and radioactive waste.

In Somalian waters, pirate ships captured are scuttled. Most nations have little interest in prosecuting the pirates, thus this is usually the only repercussion.

In March 2022 Ukraine scuttled the Ukrainian frigate Hetman Sahaidachny, a Krivak-class frigate, owing to encroaching Russian offensive operations that threatened to capture the frigate.

In February 2023 the Brazilian Navy scuttled the decommissioned aircraft carrier São Paulo into the Atlantic Ocean, following the rejections of injunctions from the Ministry of the Environment and the Federal Public Ministry.

In November 2026 the SS United States was scuttled to create an artificial reef.

== Bibliography ==
- George, S. C. (1981). Jutland to Junkyard. Edinburgh: Paul Harris Publishing. ISBN 9780862280291.
