= French submarine Iris =

History

France
- Name: Iris
- Namesake: Iris
- Builder: Ateliers et Chantiers Dubigeon, Nantes
- Laid down: 1 July 1932
- Launched: 23 September 1934
- Commissioned: 15 September 1936
- Decommissioned: 1 February 1950
- Fate: Scrapped

General characteristics
- Class & type: Minerve-class submarine
- Displacement: 662 long tons (673 t) surfaced; 856 long tons (870 t) submerged
- Length: 68.1 m (223 ft 5 in)
- Beam: 5.6 m (18 ft 4 in)
- Draught: 4 m (13 ft 1 in)
- Propulsion: 2 × Vickers-Normand diesel engines, 1,800 bhp (1,342 kW); 2 × Electric motors, 1,230 shp (917 kW)
- Speed: 14.2 knots (26.3 km/h; 16.3 mph) surfaced; 9 knots (17 km/h; 10 mph) submerged
- Range: 2,000 nmi (3,700 km; 2,300 mi) at 10 knots (19 km/h; 12 mph) surfaced; 85 nmi (157 km; 98 mi) at 5 knots (9.3 km/h; 5.8 mph) submerged
- Test depth: 80 m (260 ft)
- Complement: 42
- Armament: 1 × 75 mm (3 in)/35 Model 1928 deck gun with 150 rounds; 2 × 13.2 mm (0.52 in) AA machine guns; 6 × 550 mm (21.7 in) internal torpedo tubes (4 bow/2 stern) with 12 torpedoes; 3 × 400 mm (15.7 in) external torpedo tubes

Iris (Q188) was a Minerve-class submarine of the French Navy, commissioned in 1936. The boat was interned in Spain from November 1942, following the scuttling of the French fleet in Toulon, finally returning to service post-war until 1950.

== Service history ==
The submarine was laid down on 1 July 1932 at the Ateliers et Chantiers Dubigeon shipyard at Nantes, launched on 23 September 1934, and commissioned on 15 September 1936.

On 27 November 1942, following the German occupation of Vichy, the fleet at Toulon were ordered to scuttle their ships, however Iris was one of five submarines (the others were Casabianca, Marsouin, Glorieux, and Vénus) that disobeyed and attempted to escape, sailing from the harbour avoiding minefields and circling German Ju 88 bombers. Iris, under the command of Lieutenant de vaisseau Degé, with a skeleton crew of only 17 men, escaped from Toulon harbour and once in the open sea submerged until nightfall, evading the screen of German U-boats stationed there to intercept them, and further out British submarines on the same mission.

Iris sailed to neutral Spain, arriving at Barcelona on the 28th. Under the terms of the 1907 Hague Convention a warship can stay in a neutral port for a maximum of 48 hours or be interned. Degé contacted the French Consul General, who was unable to assist them in procuring any more food and fuel (of which they were desperately short) or gaining any extension to the deadline. After contacting the French Naval Attaché at Madrid the crew of Iris was offered a simple choice; internment or scuttling. They voted for internment. The crew were held at the prison camp at Miranda de Ebro, while a Spanish crew under the supervision of Degé and Enseigne de vaisseau Robert Lagane maintained the submarine.

In January 1943, in order to prevent any escape attempts, the propellers were removed, and in late February Iris was towed to Cartagena.

Finally, on 29 November 1945, Iris returned to France, and remained in service until decommissioned on 1 February 1950.

== See also ==
- List of submarines of France
