= Operation Attila =

1942 German military operation

During World War II, Operation Attila (named after Attila the Hun) was a plan for the German occupation of Vichy France. It was drawn up as War Directive no. 19 in December 1940 in case the French rejoined the Allies or of an Allied threat to the south of France. An important aspect was the capture of the French Navy, with various measures under consideration to prevent its escape despite the fact that little resistance was otherwise expected.

Owing to the changing situation of the war, particularly as a consequence of the events on the Eastern front, the original plan was never executed. An altered version (Case Anton), designed as an improvised plan to be "carried out at very short notice", which included Italian forces, was executed on 11 November 1942 in response to the Operation Torch landings in North Africa.

The attempt to capture the French fleet, Operation Lila, failed due to the scuttling of the French fleet at Toulon, on orders of Admiral Jean de Laborde, to prevent its capture. As a result of the action, the Germans and Italians failed to gain the use of three battleships, seven cruisers, twenty-eight destroyers and twenty submarines. However, the destruction of the fleet also denied it to Charles de Gaulle and the Free French Forces, which explained Hitler's satisfaction at the result.
