= List of Adolf Hitler's directives =

Instructions and strategic plans issued by Adolf Hitler himself

The following is a list of the Führer directives and Führer Orders issued by Adolf Hitler over the course of World War II:

== List ==
Directive no.	Date issued	Subject	Notes	Full text
1	September 1, 1939	Plan of Attack on Poland	Invasion of Poland	
2	September 3, 1939	Hostilities in the West		
3	September 9, 1939	Transfer of Forces from Poland to the West		
4	September 25, 1939	Finishing the War in Poland		
5	September 30, 1939	Partition of Poland, removing restrictions on naval warfare.		
6	October 9, 1939	Plans for Offensive in the West		
7	October 18, 1939	Preparations for Attack in the West		
8	November 20, 1939	Further Preparations for Attack in the West		
9	November 29, 1939	Instructions for Warfare against the Economy of the Enemy		
10	January 19–February 18, 1940	Concentration of Forces for "Case Yellow" (Fall Gelb)	Manstein Plan	
10a	March 1, 1940	Case "Weser Exercise" against Denmark and Norway	Operation Weserübung	
11	May 14, 1940	The Offensive in the West		
12	May 18, 1940	Prosecution of the Attack in the West		
13	May 24, 1940	Next Object in the West		
14	June 8, 1940	Continuation of the Offensive in France		
15	June 14, 1940	Advance on the Loire		
16	July 16, 1940	Preparations for Operation Sea Lion	Specifies a broad front landing on south coast of England from Ramsgate to Isle of Wight.	
17	August 1, 1940	Battle of Britain		
18	November 12, 1940	Seizure of Gibraltar	Operation Felix	Full text
19	December 10, 1940	German occupation of Vichy France	Operation Attila	Full text
20	December 13, 1940	German invasion of Greece	Operation Marita	
21	December 18, 1940	Invasion of the Soviet Union	Operation Barbarossa	Führer Directive 21
22	January 11, 1941	German Support for Battles in the Mediterranean Area	Operation Sonnenblume	
23	February 6, 1941	Directions for Operations against the English War Economy		
24	March 5, 1941	Co-operation with Japan		
25	March 27, 1941	Plan of Attack on Yugoslavia	(see Führer Directive No. 25)	Original text
26	April 3, 1941	Co-operation with our Allies in the Balkans		
27	April 4, 1941	Plan of Attack on Greece		
28	April 25, 1941	Invasion of Crete	Operation Mercury	
29	May 17, 1941	Proposed Military Government of Greece		
30	May 23, 1941	Support of anti-British forces in Iraq	(see Führer Directive No. 30)	
31	June 9, 1941	German Military Organisation in the Balkans	Battle of Crete	
32	June 11, 1941	Plans following defeat of the Soviet Union	Operation Orient	Full text
32a	July 14, 1941	Use of resources following defeat of the Soviet Union		Full text
33	July 19, 1941	Continuation of the War in the East	Two Panzer Groups were removed from Army Group Centre, depriving it of the armour which it would otherwise have used to attack Moscow.	
33a	July 23, 1941	Supplement to 33		
34	July 30, 1941	Strengthening Soviet resistance		
34a	August 12, 1941	Supplement to 34		
35	September 6, 1941	Closing the encirclement of Leningrad, destruction of the Southwestern Front	Battle of Moscow, Siege of Leningrad	
36	September 22, 1941	Instructions for Winter operations in the Arctic	Instructions to the Army High Command, Norway, the navy and the air force for winter operations in and around northern Norway, Finland, and the Soviet Arctic regions.	
37	October 10, 1941	Reorganizing forces in the Arctic		
38	December 2, 1941	Transfer of air units to the Mediterranean		
39	December 8, 1941	Abandoning the Offensive on the Eastern Front	Cancels Operation Barbarossa in reaction to the massive Soviet winter counter-offensive	
40	March 23, 1942	Competence of Commanders in Coastal Areas	Command Organization of the Coast's Atlantic Wall	
41	April 5, 1942	Summer Campaign in the Soviet Union	Operation Blue	
42	May 29, 1942	Instructions for operations against unoccupied France and the Iberian Peninsula	Operation Attila replaced by Case Anton; Operation Isabella cancelled	
43	July 11, 1942	Continuation of Operations from the Crimea		
44	July 21, 1942	Operations in Northern Finland		
45	July 23, 1942	Continuation of Operation Brunswick		
46	August 18, 1942	Instructions for Intensified Action Against Banditry in the East	Attempting to suppress Soviet resistance movements	
47	December 28, 1942	Outlines the Chain of command for the South Eastern Mediterranean, and defensive strategies for a possible Allied attack on the Balkans and surrounding islands.		
48	July 26, 1943	Command and defence measures in the southeast		
49	July, 1943	Believed to be a contingency plan to seize Italian positions in the event of their withdrawal from the war.	Did not survive?	
50	September 28, 1943	Concerning the preparations for the withdrawal of 20th Mountain Army to Northern Finland and Northern Norway		
51	November 3, 1943	Preparations for a two-front war		
52	January 28, 1944	Battle of Rome	Battle of Monte Cassino	
53	March 8, 1944	Establishment of fortified areas and strong points		
54	April 2, 1944	Measures to halt the Soviet advance in the East		
55	May 16, 1944	Utilization of long range bombardment against England	V-1 and later V-2 missile strikes	
56	July 12, 1944	Orders for the protection of shipping		
57	July 13, 1944	Protocols for how authorities should operate in the event of an invasion of the Reich		
58	July 19, 1944	Preparations for the defense of the Reich		
59	July 23, 1944	Reorganization of Army Group North's command structure		
60	July 26, 1944	Defensive measures for the Italian Alps		
61	August 24, 1944	Establishment of defensive positions in the West		
62	August 29, 1944	Establishment of defenses along the German northern coastal regions		
63	September 1, 1944	Order for the West Wall to be on the defensive		
64	September 3, 1944	Orders for Commander-in-Chief West		
64a	September 7, 1944	Conferring powers to Commander-in-Chief West		
64b	September 9, 1944	Supplement to 64a		
65	September 12, 1944	Defensive measures for the South-East		
66	September 19–22, 1944	Second decree on command authority within the Reich in the event of invasion		
67	November 28, 1944	Exercise of command for isolated units		
68	January 21, 1945	Reestablishing the command supremacy of the Fuhrer		
69	January 28, 1945	Employment of the Volkssturm		
70	February 5, 1945	Evacuation of refugees from the East to Denmark		
71	March 20, 1945	Orders for a scorched earth campaign within the Reich	"Decree Concerning Demolitions in the Reich Territory" also known as Nero Decree	
72	April 7, 1945	Reorganization of command in the West		
73	April 15, 1945	Organization of command in the event Northern and Southern Germany are separated		
74	April 15, 1945	Order of the day to soldiers on the Eastern Front		
