= French cruiser Jean de Vienne =

French light cruiser launched in 1935, scuttled in 1942

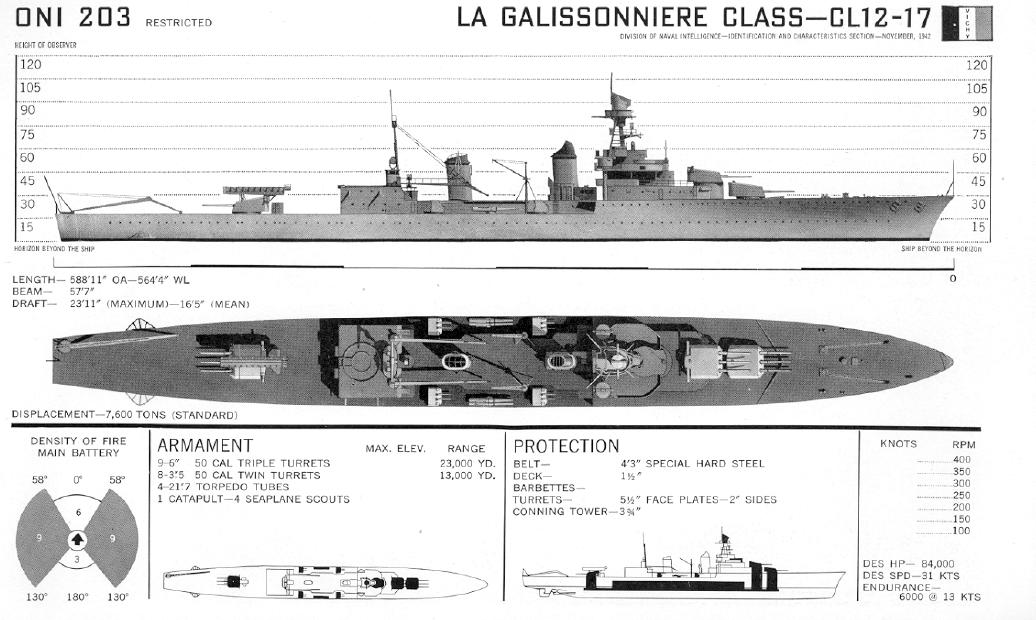
- General layout of a La Galissonnière-class cruiser

History

France
- Name: Jean de Vienne
- Namesake: Jean de Vienne
- Builder: Arsenal de Lorient, Lorient
- Laid down: 20 December 1931
- Launched: 31 July 1935
- Commissioned: 10 February 1937
- Fate: Scuttled 27 November 1942, later transferred to Regia Marina

Italy
- Name: FR.11
- Acquired: November 1942; 18 February 1943 (raised)
- Fate: Bombed in Toulon 24 November 1943, scrapped August 1944

General characteristics
- Class & type: La Galissonnière-class cruiser
- Displacement: 7,600 tons (standard); 9,120 tons (full load)
- Length: 179 m (587 ft)
- Beam: 17.5 m (57 ft)
- Draught: 5.35 m (17.6 ft)
- Propulsion: 2-shaft Parsons single reduction geared turbines; 4 Indret boilers; 84,000 shp (63,000 kW)
- Speed: 31 knots (57 km/h; 36 mph)
- Range: 7,000 nmi (13,000 km; 8,100 mi) at 12 knots (22 km/h; 14 mph)
- Complement: 540
- Armament: Initial; 9 × 152 mm (6.0 in)/55 guns (3 × 3); 8 × 90 mm (3.5 in) AA (4 × 2); 8 × 37 mm (1.5 in) light AA (4 × 2); 12 × 13.2 mm (0.52 in) light AA (4 × 3); 4 × 550 mm (22 in) torpedo tubes (2 × 2); Vichy refit (1941); 9 × 152 mm (6.0 in)/55 guns (3 × 3); 8 × 90 mm (3.5 in) AA (4 × 2); 9 × 37 mm (1.5 in) light AA (4 × 2, 1 × 1); 2 × 25 mm (0.98 in) light AA (1 × 2); 16 × 13.2 mm (0.52 in) light AA (4 × 3, 2 × 2); 4 × 550 mm (22 in) torpedo tubes (2 × 2)
- Armour: Main belt: 105 mm (4.1 in); End bulkheads: 30 mm (1.2 in); Sides: 120 mm (4.7 in); Deck: 38 mm (1.5 in); Turrets: 100 mm (3.9 in); Conning tower: 95 mm (3.7 in)
- Aircraft carried: up to 4 GL-832, later 2 Loire 130 flying boats; 1 catapult

Jean de Vienne was a French light cruiser of the La Galissonnière class. During World War II, she remained with Vichy France. She was named for Jean de Vienne, a 14th-century French knight, general and admiral during the Hundred Years' War.

== Design and description ==
The La Galissonnière class was designed as an enlarged and improved version of the preceding Emile Bertin. The ships had an overall length of 179.5 meters (588 ft 11 in), a beam of 17.48 meters (57 ft 4 in), and a draft of 5.28 meters (17 ft 4 in). They displaced 7,722 metric tons (7,600 long tons) at standard load and 9,460 t (9,310 long tons) at deep load. Their crew consisted of 557 men in peacetime and 612 in wartime.

When completed, La Galissonnière, Jean de Vienne, and Marseillaise formed the 3rd Cruisers Division, flagship Marseillaise, attached to the Mediterranean Squadron, and based in Bizerte. At the start of World War II, Jean de Vienne had completed a major refit at Toulon and had returned to the 3rd Cruiser Division, still at Bizerte. Her formation was to protect French interests in North Africa, should Italy enter the war. As Italy remained neutral, the 3rd Cruiser Division's role was limited, the main event being to transport French gold bullion to Halifax, Nova Scotia in December 1939. After Italy's entry into the war on 10 June 1940, there was a major French sortie to prevent anticipated attempts by the Kriegsmarine to force the Straits of Gibraltar. The only sight of the enemy was a failed attack by the Dandolo.

With the other La Galissonnière-class cruisers, Jean de Vienne was at Algiers at the time of the Armistice, in late June 1940. On 3 July, at Mers-el-Kébir, Admiral Sommerville, commander of Force H, had to deliver an ultimatum to the French admiral commanding the French battleship squadron, either to join the British or to be attacked. As negotiations dragged on, the French Admiralty signaled in a radio message in clear, that the Algiers cruisers had been ordered to join the battleship squadron off Mers-el-Kébir. The British Admiralty warned Admiral Somerville and hurried him to put an end to the negotiations with the French admiral and to open fire. So the six cruisers, too far to intervene, made for Toulon instead, where they arrived the day after. Jean de Vienne remained there, out of action until she joined the French High Seas Force in March 1941. In January 1942, Jean de Vienne was sent to rescue the liner Lamoriciere, whose sinking in a winter tempest, off the Balearic Islands, caused more than 300 deaths. .

During the scuttling of the French fleet in Toulon, Jean de Vienne was in drydock, and her captain, Capitaine de Vaisseau Mailloux had her moved forward, to obstruct the gates. Although German commandos rushed aboard and found and disarmed the demolition charges, the ship's valves had been opened and the ship settled, blocking the gates and making the drydock useless. Her crew had also smashed every piece of equipment.

== Italian FR.11 ==
She was handed over to Italy's Regia Marina, renamed FR.11 and raised on 18 February 1943. Italy received many French ships in November 1942 in addition to Jean de Vienne: 2 light cruisers, 11 destroyers, 11 minor ships (corvettes, etc.), 9 submarines and 10 minesweepers.

A ship refit was begun but was only about 85% complete at the time of the Italian armistice.

By the end of June 1943, FR.11 was ready to be moved from Toulon to Liguria for the last repairs, and a crew from the sunken Italian cruiser Trieste was sent to Toulon in order to manage the ship. However, the departure was delayed and the vessel fell into German hands once more in September.

During a USAAF air raid, the ship was hit by incendiary bombs on 24 November 1943 and set ablaze, gradually listing until she rested against the quayside. When Toulon was liberated by the Allies in August 1944 (Operation Dragoon), a refit was considered but the idea was abandoned and Jean de Vienne was scrapped.

== Bibliography ==
- Jordan, John & Moulin, Jean (2013). French Cruisers 1922–1956. Barnsley, UK: Seaforth Publishing. ISBN 978-1-84832-133-5.
- Whitley, M. J. (1995). Cruisers of World War Two: An International Encyclopedia. London: Cassell. ISBN 1-86019-874-0.
