= Gabriel Auphan =

French naval officer (1894–1982)

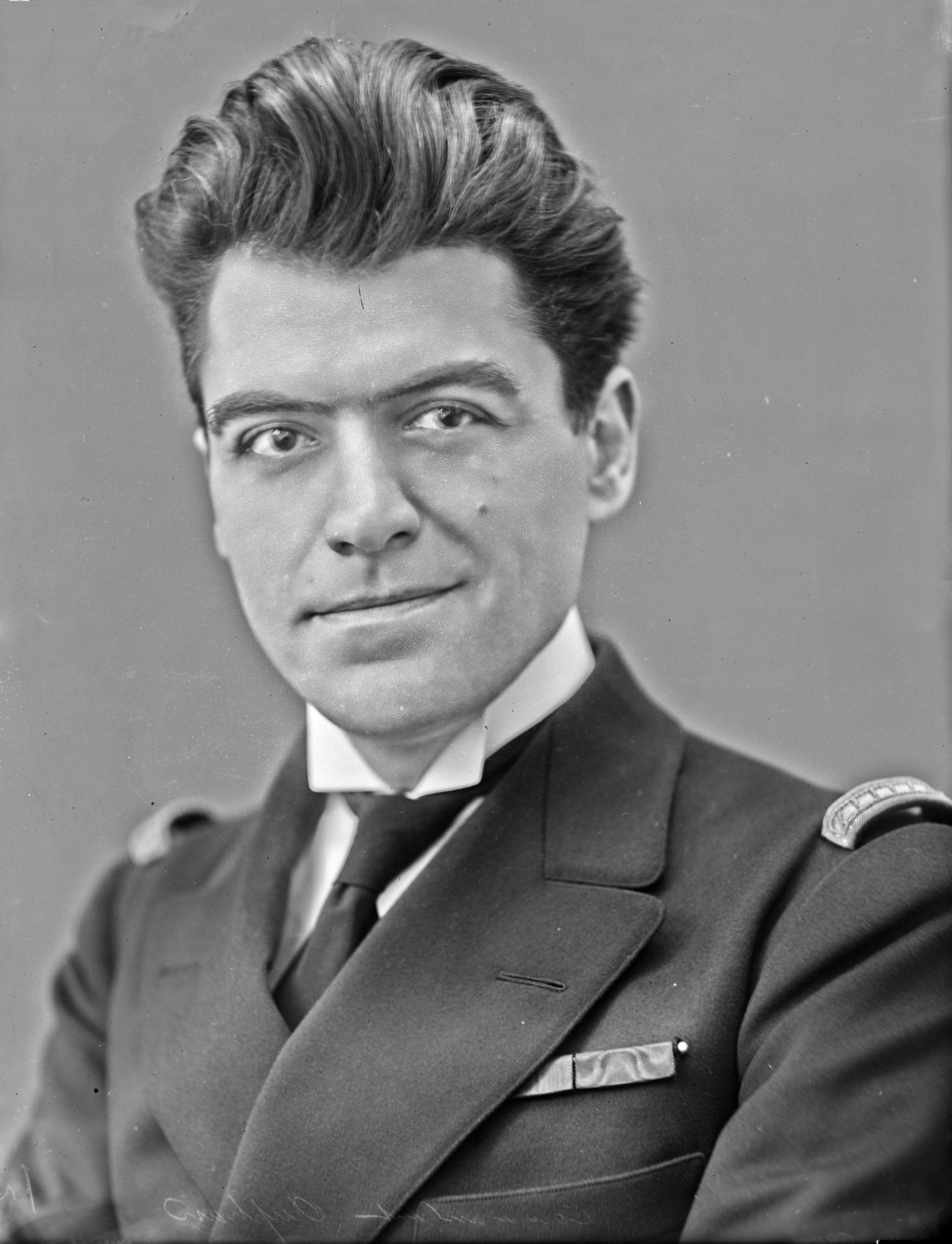
- Gabriel Auphan in 1927
- Born: November 4, 1894; Alès, France
- Died: April 6, 1982 (aged 87) Versailles, France
- Allegiance: France
- Branch: French Navy
- Service years: 1911–1944
- Rank: Counter admiral
- Commands: Le Verrier (1920–1922); Fulton (1925–1927); La Palme (1929–1930); Émile Bertin (1936–1937); Chef d'état-major des forces maritimes (1941); Secrétaire d'État à la Marine (1942)
- Conflicts: World War I World War II

Gabriel Paul Auphan (November 4, 1894 – April 6, 1982) was a French naval officer who served as State Secretary of the Navy (secrétaire d'État à la Marine) in the Vichy government from April 18 to November 18, 1942.

== Naval career ==
Auphan entered the École navale in 1911, was commissioned enseigne de vaisseau in 1914, and served with the Northern Squadron and in the Mediterranean, including the Dardanelles theatre. He later served with naval intelligence in the Levant and as executive officer on the aviso Laborieux. Promoted lieutenant de vaisseau in 1919, he commanded the submarine Le Verrier (1920–1922) and subsequently Fulton (1925–1927). He held staff posts in the central Navy staff and in ministerial cabinets and commanded the destroyer La Palme and the cruiser Émile Bertin before being appointed to training and staff duties; in 1937–1938 he commanded Jeanne d’Arc on a world cruise for midshipmen. He attained capitaine de vaisseau in 1936 and was active in inter-Allied planning on the eve of war. He became contre-amiral on June 19, 1940.

== Vichy government ==
In August 1941 Auphan was named chef d'état-major des forces maritimes. After Pierre Laval returned to head the government, Auphan was appointed State Secretary of the Navy from April 18 to November 18, 1942; he was succeeded by Jean-Marie Charles Abrial.

== November 1942 and the Toulon scuttling ==
Following the Allied landings in North Africa (Operation Torch) on 8 November 1942 and the subsequent German occupation of the so-called Free Zone (11 November), Auphan instructed the Toulon naval commanders Jean de Laborde and André Marquis to prevent any seizure of the fleet and, if necessary, to scuttle the ships rather than allow capture. On 27 November 1942, with German forces attempting to take the base (Operation Lila), the French Navy scuttled its fleet at Toulon; several submarines escaped to North Africa or Spain. Auphan resigned on 18 November 1942, prior to the scuttling.

== 1944 mission and arrest ==
On 11 August 1944 Philippe Pétain tasked Auphan with approaching Charles de Gaulle regarding a formal handover of authority. Auphan delivered Pétain’s letter to General Alphonse Juin on 27 August 1944; de Gaulle refused to receive him and ordered his arrest. He subsequently became a fugitive and went into hiding.

== Prosecution and later life ==
Tried in absentia by the High Court of Justice on 14 August 1946, Auphan was sentenced to forced labour, indignité nationale for life and confiscation of property. Returned to France, he was retried on 19–20 July 1955 and given a five-year suspended prison term and five years of indignité nationale; in 1956 the Council of State restored his rank and pension rights. He subsequently wrote widely on naval and contemporary history and died in Versailles in 1982.

== Publications ==
- La Lutte pour la vie 1940–1942 ou La Marine au service des Français (1947)
- Mensonges et vérité – Essai sur la France (1949)
- Les grimaces de l’histoire et l’histoire de mes trahisons (1951)
- Les échéances de l’histoire ou l’éclatement des empires coloniaux de l’Occident (1952)
- Le Drame de la désunion européenne (1955)
- La Marine dans l’histoire de France (1955)
- La Marine française dans la Seconde Guerre mondiale (with Jacques Mordal) (1958)
- Histoire de la Méditerranée (1962)
- Histoire élémentaire de Vichy (1971)
- Histoire de la décolonisation (1975)
- L’honneur de servir (1978)

== See also ==
- Scuttling of the French fleet at Toulon
- Jean-Marie Charles Abrial

Political offices
Preceded by François Darlan	State Secretary of the Navy; 1942	Succeeded by Jean-Marie Charles Abrial
