= French cruiser Colbert (1928) =

Heavy cruiser of the Suffren class

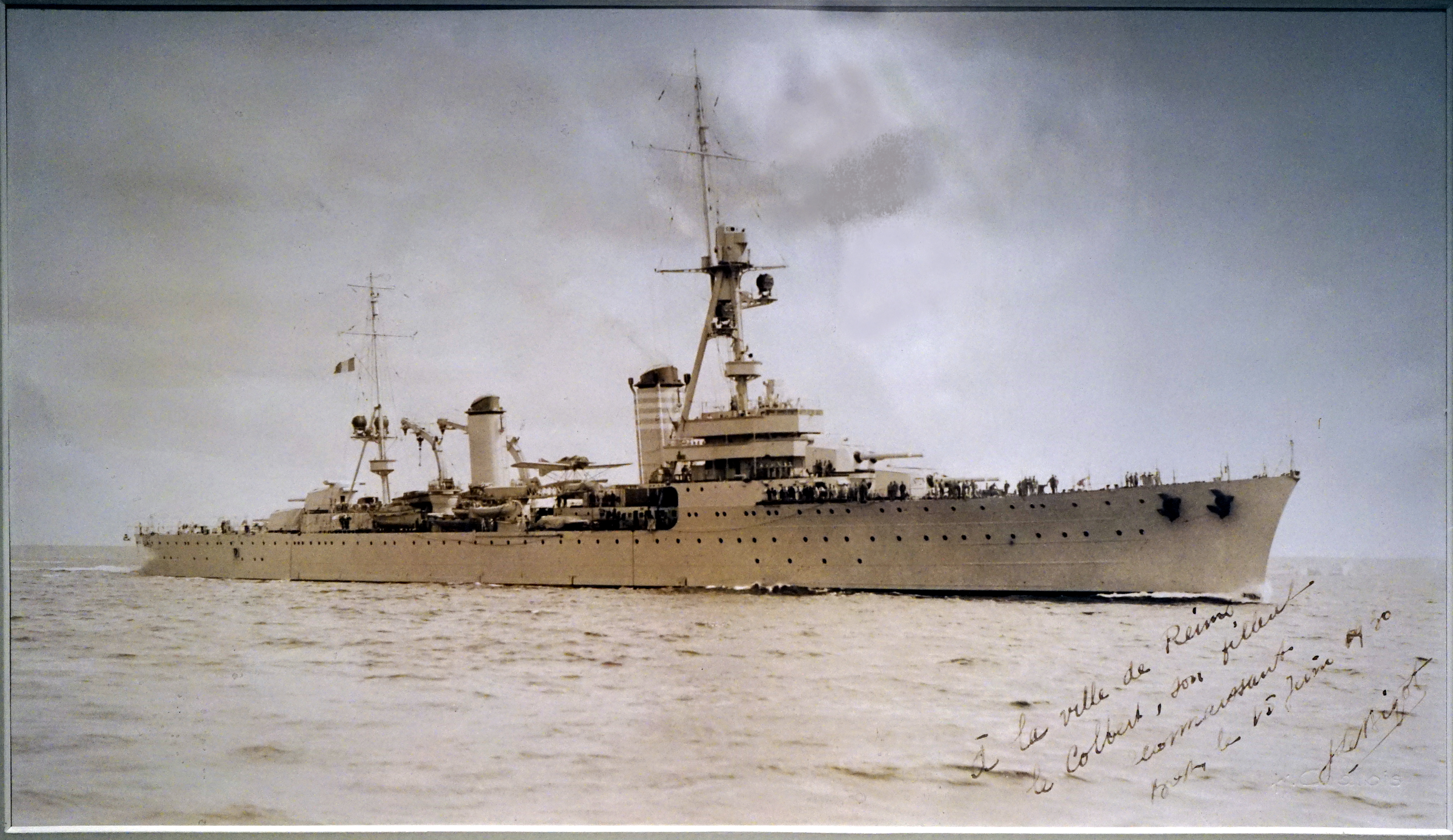
- Colbert

History

France
- Name: Colbert
- Namesake: Jean Baptiste Colbert
- Builder: Arsenal de Brest
- Laid down: 12 June 1927
- Launched: 20 April 1928
- Completed: 4 March 1931
- Commissioned: 11 November 1929
- In service: 1 April 1931
- Out of service: scuttled at Toulon, 27 November 1942
- Fate: Scrapped 1948

General characteristics
- Class & type: Suffren-class cruiser
- Type: Treaty Cruiser; Marine National designation; 1925 Light Cruiser; 1931 1st Class Cruiser
- Displacement: 10,160 t (10,000 long tons) (standard); 11,769 t (11,583 long tons) (Normal); 13,135 t (12,928 long tons) (full load)
- Length: 194 m (636.48 ft) overall; 185 m (606.96 ft) between perpendiculars
- Beam: 19.26 m (63.19 ft)
- Draught: 6.51 m (21.36 ft) at normal displacement
- Installed power: 6 Guyot du Temple boilers, 20 kg/cm2 (215°) plus two small coal/oil fired boilers; 88,768.8 shp (66,194.9 kW)
- Propulsion: 3-shaft Rateau-Bretagne geared steam turbines
- Speed: 32 knots (59 km/h) (designed)
- Range: 1,876 tons oil fuel and 500 tons coal; radius 4,600 nautical miles (8,500 km) at 15 knots (28 km/h); 2,000 nautical miles (3,700 km) at 11 knots (20 km/h) on cruise boilers; 3,700 nautical miles (6,900 km) at 20 knots (37 km/h)
- Complement: 773
- Armament: Initial; 8 × 203 mm (8.0 in)/50 guns (4 × 2); 8 × 90 mm (3.5 in)/50 AA guns (8 × 1); 6 × 37 mm (1.5 in) light AA guns (6 × 1); 12 × 13.2 mm (0.52 in) AA machine guns (4 × 3); 6 × 550 mm (22 in) torpedo tubes (2 × 3); 1941 refit; 8 × 203 mm (8.0 in)/50 guns (4 × 2); 8 × 90 mm (3.5 in)/50 AA guns (8 × 1); 12 × 37 mm (1.5 in) light AA guns (12 × 1); 32 × 13.2 mm (0.52 in) AA machine guns (7 x 4, 2 × 2); 4 × 8 mm (0.31 in) AA machine guns (4 × 1); 6 × 550 mm (22 in) torpedo tubes (2 × 3)
- Armour: Belt: 50 mm (2.0 in); Deck: 25 mm (0.98 in); Turrets and conning tower: 30 mm (1.2 in); Magazine box 50 mm (2.0 in) sides with 20 mm (0.79 in) crowns
- Aircraft carried: 3 GL-810 then Loire-Nieuport 130
- Aviation facilities: 2 catapults

Colbert was the second of four Suffren class cruisers built for the French Navy. During the interwar period she served in the Mediterranean. In 1935 she underwent a major refit at Lorient before joining the International Patrol off the Spanish south coast during the Spanish Civil War. In 1939 she was in Oran moving to Toulon in January 1940. She partook in the bombardment of Genoa in mid-June. She was in Toulon at the time of the French Armistice. She underwent a refit in 1941 to augment her light anti-aircraft guns then was placed in care and maintenance at Toulon. She was scuttled at Toulon when the Germans attempted to seize the French Fleet at the end of November 1942. She was raised and scrapped post war in 1948.

She was named in honour of Jean-Baptiste Colbert (1619–1683), the Controller General of Finances under King Louis XIV from 1665 to 1683. He was responsible for bringing France out of bankruptcy, restoring the financial health of the nation and laying the foundation of the French Navy, including bases and the training of the officers and men.

== Design and description ==
Under the 1926 program a 10,000 ton Treaty Cruiser was authorized, becoming the second ship of the Suffren class. The contract for the new vessel was awarded to the Arsenal de Brest with the order being placed on 1 March 1927. The Hull would be basically identical to the Suffren with the same level of protection and machinery layout. The differences in the layout topside would differentiate her from her sister. The raised bridge was lowered back on top of the conning position, 90 mm guns in single mounts would replace the 75 mm guns. The aircraft catapults were moved forward to between the funnels and two new cranes were fitted abeam of the second funnel. She was laid down as Project Number C1 with her hull designated as number 77 on 12 June 1927 at Brest. She was launched on 20 April 1928. She continued to fit out until ready for her contractor trials on 15 June 1929. With acceptance from the contractors she underwent acceptance trials on 29 August. She was commissioned on 11 November 1929 On 10 May 1930 she partook in a Naval Review celebrating 100 years since the arrival of the French in Algeria at Algiers. She was finally completed on 4 March 1931.

== Service history ==
=== Pre war service ===
On 1 April 1931 she entered service with La Marine National and was assigned to the First Light Division of the First Squadron at Toulon. She carried out normal peacetime operations until 1935. In February 1935 she proceeded to Lorient and started a major refit on 16 February which lasted until January 1936. On 12 April 1937 the First Light Division was renamed as the First Cruiser Division and consisted of Colbert, Foch, Dupleix and Algérie. On 27 May 1937 she was present at the Great Naval Review at Brest following Naval Maneuvers with the Mediterranean and Atlantic Squadrons. Upon returning to the Mediterranean she was assigned to the International Patrol off the south coast of Spain. The international Patrol had been formed to protect merchant shipping from piracy instituted by unknown (probably Italian) submarines.

=== Wartime service ===
At the beginning of the war she was in Toulon. In December she sailed with Tourville for Bizerte, Tunisia. On 8 December after forming the Second Cruiser Division both ships sailed to monitor shipping as far east as Beirut. She returned to Bizerte on 28 December. In January 1940 she joined Force Y arriving at Dakar on 30 January to replace Force X. The first sortie was from 18 to 28 February. She was due to participate in the second sortie from 6 to 18 March, but was sent on 7 March to reinforce Force X consisting of the battleship Bretagne and cruiser Algérie escorting gold to Canada. She returned to Dakar when completed. Force Y left Dakar on 11 April 1940 and returned to Toulon.

On the night of 13/14 June she participated in Operation Vado, the bombardment of Genoa and Vado, Italy by the Third Squadron. The Vado Group included the cruisers Foch and Algérie and the Genoa Group included the cruisers Dupleix and Colbert. The bombardment cause little damage as Group Genoa fired at the wrong target and half of Group Vado shells fell into the sea. The squadron returned to Toulon by mid-day on 14 June. Foch suffered a steering malfunction but returned safely. On 25 June the Franco-German Armistice took effect and La Marine Nationale ceased all offensive operations. On 3 July with the ill-conceived British attack on Mers-el-Kébir, the battleship Strasbourg had escape undamaged, the Fourth Cruiser Division had sailed from Algiers to Oran. The Fourth failed to link up with Strasbourg so they sailed for Toulon. Algérie, Foch and Colbert with twelve contre-torpilleurs sailed from Toulon to rendezvous with the French forces sailing north to France. They linked up with the Fourth in the early morning of 4 July and returned to Toulon. Strasbourg arrived later that evening. In August 1940 Colbert underwent a refit to upgrade her light anti-aircraft weapons. The quad 13.2 mm machineguns were finally installed during this refit. When completed she was placed in care and maintenance with a reduced crew. On 1 January 1941 she was activated to replace Dupleix in the Forces de haute mer.

On 11 November 1942 the Germans started their occupation of Vichy France. The FHM was ready to sail to North Africa to defend it from the Torch landings but was denied permission to sail. By 27 November they had reached Toulon and entered the base. The Germans were delayed from entering the naval dockyard, giving the French sailors time to scuttle the fleet. Colbert was at Dock No. 5. Her guns were spiked with 35 kg charges that were successfully detonated, destroying the guns, and the sea cocks were opened, leaving Colbert to settle on the bottom. Fire took hold of the ship and she burned until 3 December. Colbert was raised after the war, and scrapped between 1946 and 1947.

== Bibliography ==
- Jordan, John & Moulin, Jean (2013). French Cruisers 1922–1956. Barnsley, UK: Seaforth Publishing. ISBN 978-1-84832-133-5.
- McMurtrie, Francis E. (1940). Jane's Fighting Ships 1940. London: Sampson Low, Marston & Company, Ltd.
- Whitley, M.J. (1995). Cruisers of World War Two – An International Encyclopedia. London: Arms and Armour Press. ISBN 1-85409-225-1.
