= André Marquis =

French admiral (1883–1957)

- Born: 24 October 1883
- Died: 15 October 1957 (aged 73)
- Military career
- Allegiance: France
- Branch: French Navy

André Marquis (24 October 1883 – 15 October 1957) was a French Vichyist admiral, famous for the scuttling of the French fleet in Toulon.

Marquis was préfet maritime of Toulon, and as such, oversaw the base. He was captured by the Germans in the wake of their attempt to capture the French fleet, but his chief of staff managed to warn other officers and transmit the order to scuttle the fleet.

At the Liberation, he was tried for treason, failure to save his fleet, failing to deliver his fleet to the Allies, and indignité nationale.
