= Case Anton =

1942 occupation of France in WWII

- Part of World War II
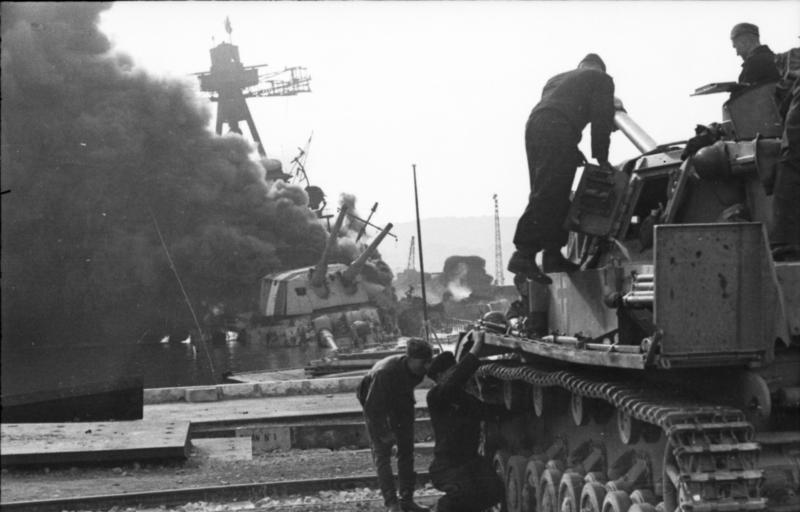
- Panzertruppen watching a burning French warship, probably Colbert
Date	10–27 November 1942 (2 weeks and 3 days)
Location	France
Result	German and Italian victory: Military occupation of the Zone libre; Division of the Zone libre between Germany and Italy; Failure to capture the French fleet

Belligerents
Germany; Italy	Vichy France

Commanders and leaders
(Nazi Germany) Johannes Blaskowitz (Fascist Italy) Mario Vercellino	(Vichy France) Philippe Pétain (Vichy France) Pierre Laval (Vichy France) Jean de Laborde

Case Anton (German: Unternehmen Anton) was the military occupation of Vichy France carried out by Nazi Germany and Fascist Italy in November 1942. It marked the end of the Vichy regime as a nominally independent state and the disbanding of its army (the severely-limited Armistice Army), but it continued its existence as a puppet government within occupied France. One of the last actions of the Vichy armed forces before their dissolution was the scuttling of the French fleet at Toulon to prevent it from falling into Axis hands.

== Background ==
A German plan to occupy Vichy France had been drawn up in December 1940 under the codename of Operation Attila and soon came to be considered with Operation Camellia, the plan to occupy Corsica. Operation Anton updated the original Operation Attila, including different Wehrmacht units and adding Italian involvement.

For Adolf Hitler, the main rationale for permitting a nominally independent France to exist was that it was, in the absence of German naval superiority, the only practical means to deny the use of the French colonies to the Allies. However, the Allied landings in French North Africa on 8 November 1942 caused that rationale to disappear, especially since it quickly became apparent that the Vichy government possessed neither the political will nor the practical means to prevent French colonial authorities from submitting to Allied occupation. Moreover, Hitler knew he could not risk an exposed flank on the French Mediterranean. After a final conversation with French Prime Minister Pierre Laval, Hitler gave orders for Corsica to be occupied on 11 November and Vichy France the following day.

== Operation ==
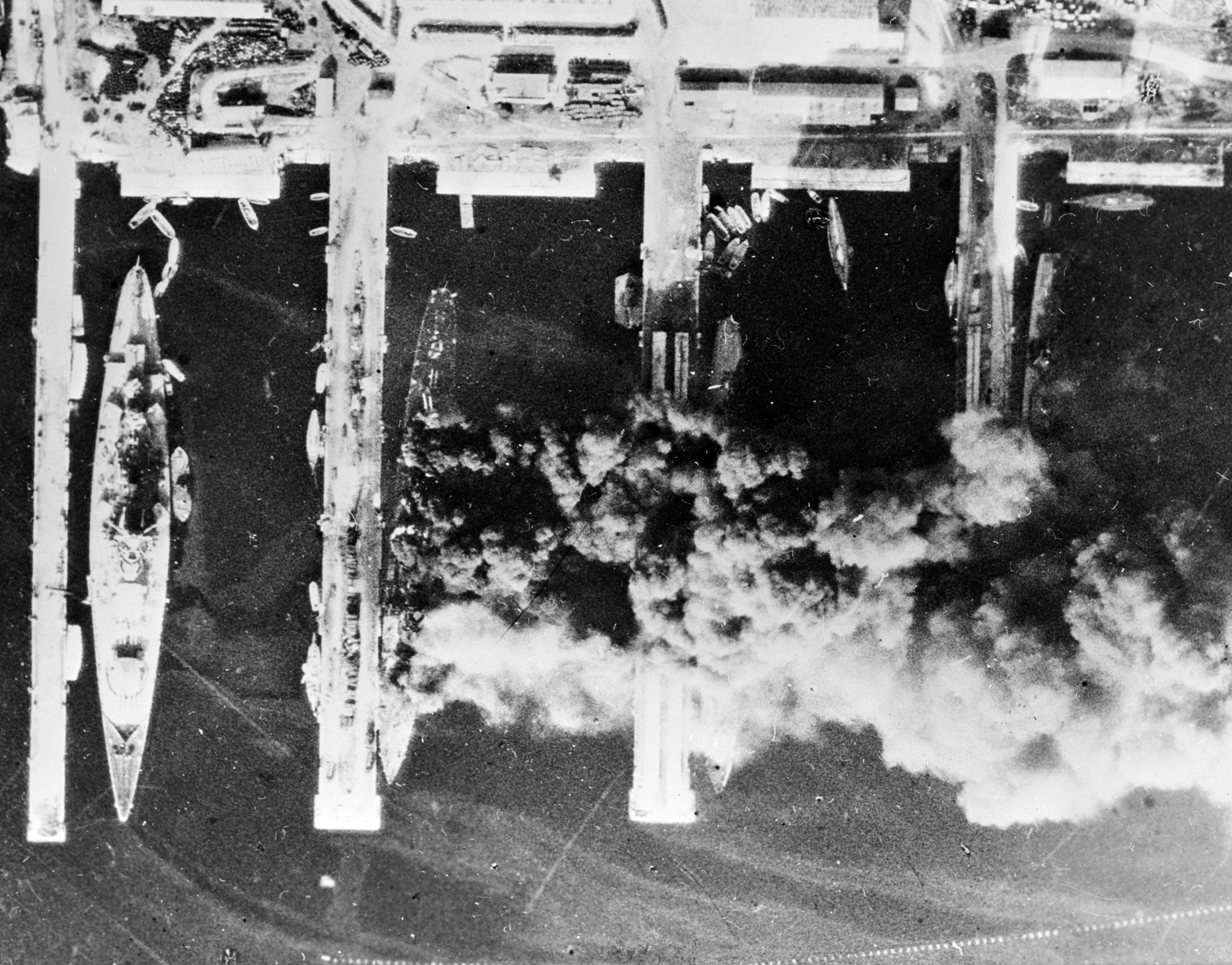
The scuttling of the French fleet, from left to right: Strasbourg, Colbert, Algérie, and Marseillaise

By the evening of 10 November 1942, Wehrmacht and Royal Italian Army forces had completed their preparations for Case Anton. The 1st Army advanced from the Atlantic coast, parallel to the France–Spain border, while the 7th Army advanced from central France towards Vichy and Toulon, under the command of General Johannes Blaskowitz. The Italian 4th Army occupied the French Riviera and an Italian division landed on Corsica. By the evening of 11 November, German tanks had reached the Mediterranean coast.

The Germans had planned Operation Lila to capture intact the demobilised French fleet at Toulon. French naval commanders managed to delay the Germans by negotiation and subterfuge long enough to scuttle their ships on 27 November, before German soldiers could seize them, preventing three battleships, seven cruisers, 28 destroyers and 20 submarines from falling into the hands of the Axis powers. Despite the disappointment of the German Naval War Staff, Hitler considered that the elimination of the French fleet sealed the success of Operation Anton since the destruction of the fleet denied it to Charles de Gaulle and the Free French Navy.

Vichy France offered no resistance, contenting itself with a radio broadcast objecting to the violation of the armistice of 1940. The German government countered that it was the French who violated the armistice first by not offering a determined resistance to the Allied landings in North Africa. The 50,000-strong Vichy French Army took defensive positions around Toulon, but when confronted by German demands to disband, it did so since it lacked the military capability to resist the forces.

== Aftermath ==
Although it became little more than a puppet government, the Vichy regime continued to exercise nominal civil authority over the whole of Metropolitan France except Alsace-Lorraine, as it had done since 1940. The Italian occupation zone was abolished following the removal of Mussolini from office and the Italian government's subsequent request for an armistice in 1943. France subsequently remained under exclusively German occupation from then until the western Allied invasions (Operation Overlord in Normandy and Operation Dragoon in the Rhone delta) and liberation of the country in 1944.

== See also ==
- German occupation of France during World War II
- Italian occupation of France during World War II
