= French submarine Marsouin (1924) =

Marsouin
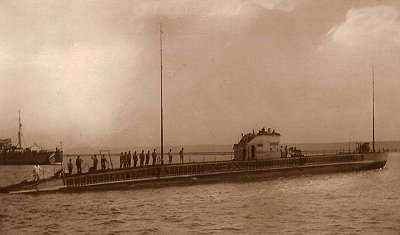

History

France
- Name: Marsouin
- Builder: Brest Arsenal
- Laid down: 4 November 1922
- Launched: 27 December 1924
- Commissioned: 7 September 1927
- Fate: Escaped from Toulon on 27 November 1942 and joined the Free French Naval Forces; disarmed at Oran in April 1944, and stricken on 28 February 1946.

General characteristics
- Class & type: Requin-class submarine
- Displacement: 1,150 long tons (1,168 t) (surfaced); 1,441 long tons (1,464 t) (submerged)
- Length: 78.30 m (256 ft 11 in)
- Beam: 6.84 m (22 ft 5 in)
- Draught: 5.10 m (16 ft 9 in)
- Propulsion: 2 × diesel engines, 2,900 hp (2,163 kW); 2 × electric motors, 1,800 hp (1,342 kW)
- Speed: 15 knots (28 km/h) (surfaced); 9 knots (17 km/h) (submerged)
- Range: 7,700 nautical miles (14,300 km) at 9 knots (17 km/h); 70 nautical miles (130 km) at 5 knots (9.3 km/h) (submerged)
- Test depth: 80 m (260 ft)
- Complement: 51 men
- Armament: 10 × 550 mm (21.7 in) torpedo tubes; 1 × 100 mm (3.9 in) deck gun; 2 × 8 mm (0.31 in) machine guns

The French submarine Marsouin was a Requin-class submarine built for the French Navy in the mid-1920s. Laid down in November 1922, it was launched in December 1924 and commissioned in September 1927. It escaped from Toulon on 27 November 1942 and joined the Free French Naval Forces; it was later disarmed at Oran in April 1944, and stricken on 28 February 1946.

== Design ==
78 m (255 ft 11 in) long, with a beam of 6.8 m (22 ft 4 in) and a draught of 5.1 m (16 ft 9 in), Requin-class submarines could dive up to 80 m (260 ft). The submarine had a surfaced displacement of 1,150 long tons (1,168 t) and a submerged displacement of 1,441 long tons (1,464 t). Propulsion while surfaced was provided by two 2,900 hp (2,163 kW) diesel motors and two 1,800 hp (1,342 kW) electric motors. The submarines' electrical propulsion allowed it to attain speeds of 9 knots (17 km/h; 10 mph) while submerged and 15 knots (28 km/h; 17 mph) on the surface. Their surfaced range was 7,700 nautical miles (14,300 km) at 9 knots (17 km/h), and 4,000 nautical miles (7,400 km) at 12 knots (22 km/h), with a submerged range of 70 nautical miles (130 km) at 5 knots (9.3 km/h).
