= Jean de Laborde =

French admiral (1878–1977)

Comte Jean de Laborde Legion of Honor
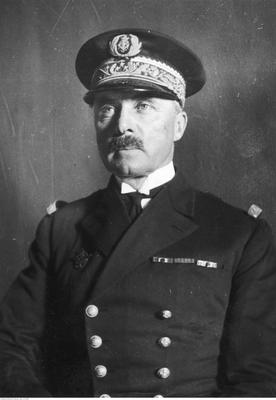
- Born: Jean Joseph Jules Noël de Laborde; 29 November 1878; Chantilly, France
- Died: 30 July 1977 (aged 98); Castillon-la-Bataille
- Spouse: Rose Marie Saldo
- Military career
- Allegiance: French Third Republic; Vichy France
- Branch: French Navy
- Service years: 1897–1943
- Rank: Admiral
- Nickname: Comte Jean
- Commands: Chief of Naval Aviation; Béarn aircraft carrier; Toulon maritime sector; Commander-in-chief 4th maritime region; Commander-in-chief Atlantic squadron; Commander-in-chief western maritime forces; Chief of Forces de Haute Mer
- Conflicts: Boxer Rebellion; World War I; World War II; Scuttling of the French fleet in Toulon
- Awards: Legion of Honor (stripped); Médaille militaire (stripped); Croix de guerre 1914–1918; Croix de guerre 1939–1945 (France); Ordre du Mérite Maritime; 1901 China expedition commemorative medal; Morocco commemorative medal (1909); Colonial Medal; Distinguished Service Medal (U.S.); Order of Ouissam Alaouite; Distinguished Service Cross (United Kingdom); Order of Glory (Tunisia)

Jean de Laborde (French pronunciation: [ʒɑ̃ də labɔʁd]; 29 November 1878 – 30 July 1977) was a French admiral who had a long career starting at the end of the 19th century and extending to World War II after which he was convicted of treason and sentenced to death. A pioneer of naval aviation in France, he captained the first French aircraft carrier, earned many awards, and held many top posts. He is most well known for his final military act, the scuttling of the French fleet in Toulon, after he refused to allow Germany to seize his fleet or to order his fleet to join the Allies during the German occupation of Vichy France in World War II, which left his prestige in ruins and led to his arrest and conviction for treason.

== Education ==
Jean de Laborde entered Naval school in 1895 with the title of "Count", which remained his nickname during his career.

== Military career ==
=== World War I and prior ===
After graduating, de Laborde was posted to the Far East in 1897 where he served first as Ensign in 1900 and took part in the Chinese campaign following the Boxer Rebellion. Upon returning to France, he was commissioned a Lieutenant in 1908. After a couple of years in Moroccan waters, he was sent back to the Far East on board the armored cruiser Dupleix. While there, he learned to fly and overflew Saigon, earning his pilot's license in 1914. As a pilot during World War I he led a flight unit and later directed the maritime aviation center at Dunkirk.

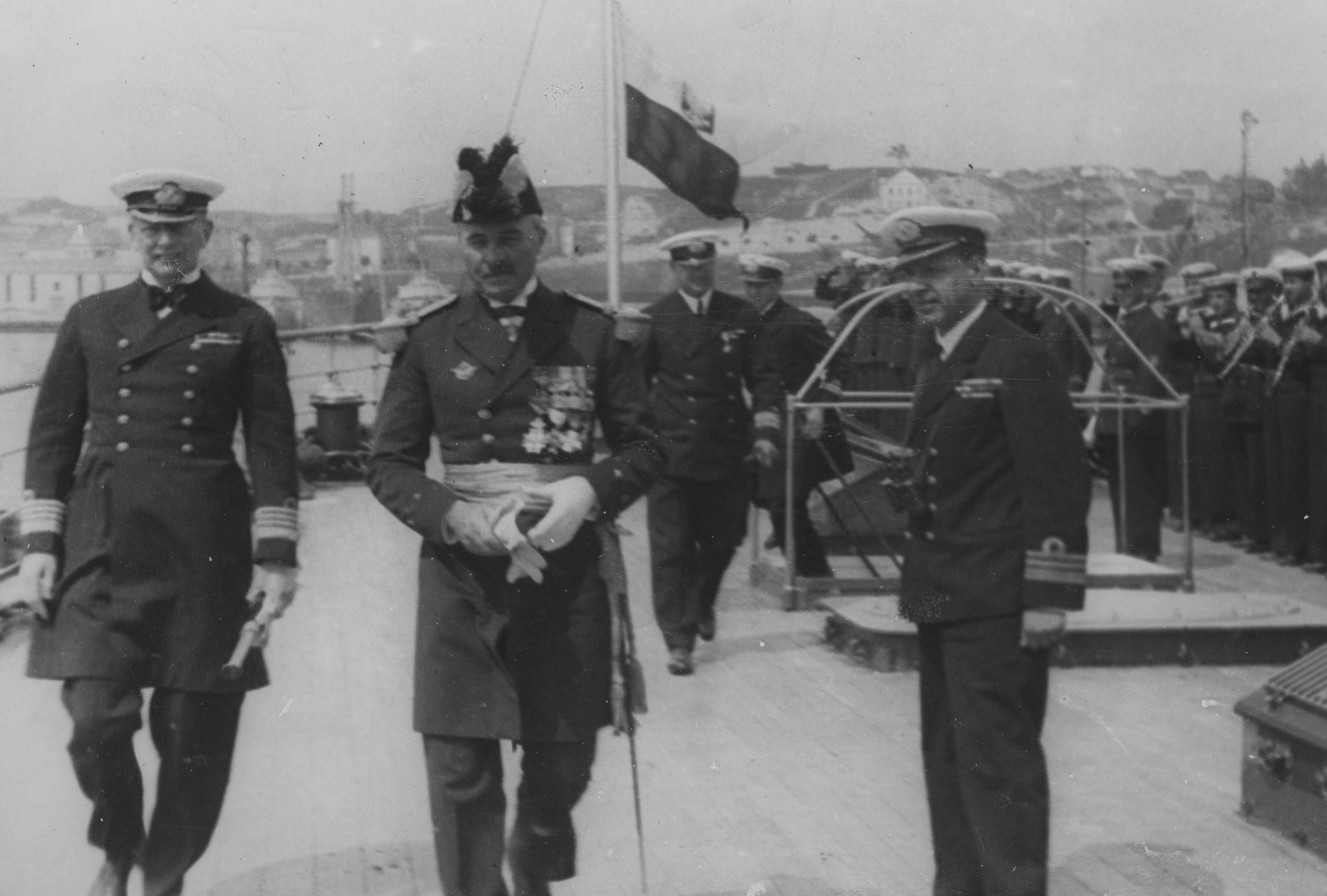
de Laborde with Józef Unrug (left) and Eugeniusz Solski (right), 1931

=== Between the wars ===
A pioneer of naval aviation in France, he was named head of naval aviation in 1925 and took command of the Béarn, the first French aircraft carrier. In 1928 at the age of 50, he earned the rank of contre-amiral, (equivalent to rear admiral), and became commander of the maritime sector of Toulon, and in 1930, commander-in-chief of the 2nd Squadron. He was elevated to Vice-Amiral (vice admiral) in 1932 and commander-in-chief and Maritime Prefect of the 4th maritime region (Bizerte) covering the Mediterranean. In 1936 de Laborde again took charge of the 2nd Squadron and later that year became commander-in-chief of the Atlantic Squadron.

From 1937 to 1940 he was a member of the Superior Naval Council (Conseil supérieur de la Marine). In 1938 he earned his fifth star, becoming Full Admiral. From 1938 to 1939 he served as inspector general of naval forces, and was involved in various naval consultative commissions under the French Third Republic.

=== World War II ===
==== German invasion of France ====
In 1939 and 1940 he served as commander-in-chief of naval forces of the West, and was known as "Admiral West". By this time, he had earned numerous medals, including the highly prestigious Legion of Honor.

Nazi Germany invaded France in May 1940, and an armistice was signed in June dividing France into two sectors, an occupied zone in the north and west, and a free zone in the southeast, with a French government administered by Marshal Philippe Pétain based in Vichy. De Laborde had reached retirement age by September 1940, but after the armistice was reactivated and named leader of the Forces de Haute mer (FHM) a newly created unit, for two years.

==== Scuttling of the Fleet ====
Pétain counted on the rivalry between de Laborde and Admiral of the fleet François Darlan to keep control. Darlan had been made Admiral of the Fleet in 1939.

As a vice-admiral, Laborde was chief of the First Squadron, organised around the battleship Strasbourg. Following the capitulation of France and the rise of Vichy government under Philippe Pétain, Laborde decided to side with the regime, and was made commander of the High Seas Fleet. Pétain counted on using Laborde's dislike of Darlan to make the Fleet easier to manage. The High Seas Fleet was composed of 38 modern units and amounting to a quarter of the total French Navy.

Very antagonistic to the British and to Charles de Gaulle, Laborde promoted a project to re-take Chad. When the Allies invaded the French colonies of North Africa in Operation Torch, he suggested that the French fleet should sail and attack the Allies in retaliation; this proposal was sharply turned down by Gabriel Auphan.

Amidst intrigue, attempted deals and changing loyalties, following invasion of North Africa by the Allies on 7 November 1942, Darlan made a deal with the Allies, ordering French troops to join the allies, which they did. Pétain stripped Darlan of his office and ordered resistance in North Africa, but was ignored. In response, Nazi troops occupied the free zone, but paused outside Toulon, the base where most of the remaining French ships were moored. On 11 November, Darlan responded by ordering Laborde join him with the fleet in North Africa. Auphan, who had succeeded Darlan as head of the navy, also privately urged him to join the Allies. Laborde rejected the appeals, insisting that he would only do so on a direct order from Petain.

On 27 November 1942 Laborde ordered the scuttling of the French fleet in Toulon to prevent his ships from falling in German, Italian or British hands. By the time the Germans tried to seize the ships, virtually all had been scuttled, sabotaged or had escaped.

After Liberation, during the Épuration légale, Laborde was sentenced to death by the Haute Cour de Justice (France) for treason and for failing to save the fleet by allowing it to defect to the Allies. His sentence was later commuted to life imprisonment, and he was pardoned in 1951.
