= French cruiser La Galissonnière =

French Navy Ship

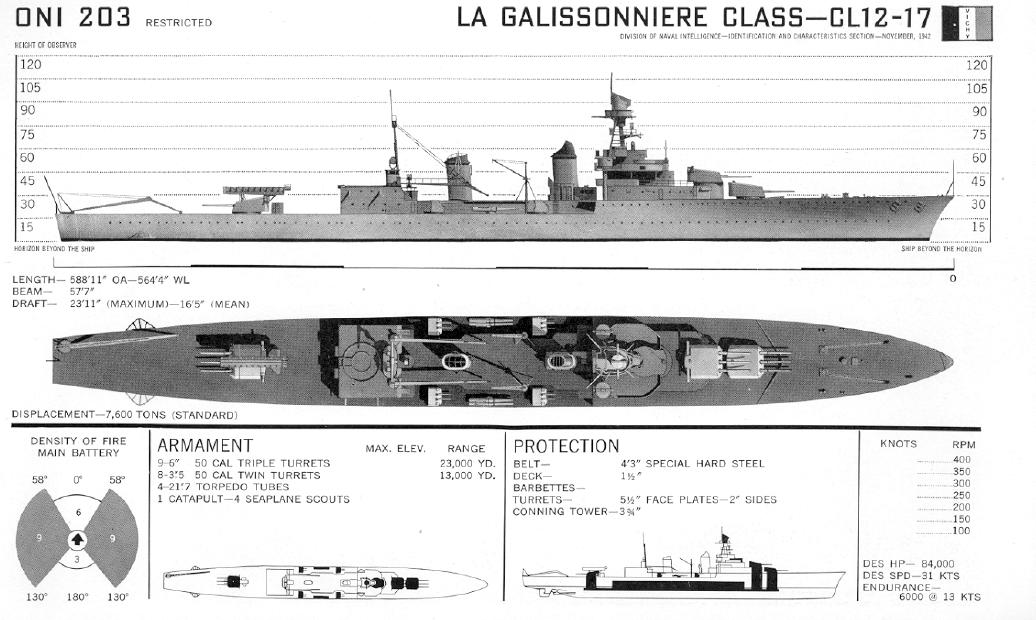
- General layout of a La Galissonnière-class cruiser

History

France
- Name: La Galissonnière
- Namesake: Roland-Michel Barrin de La Galissonière
- Builder: Arsenal de Brest, Brest
- Laid down: 15 December 1931
- Launched: 18 November 1933
- Commissioned: 1 January 1936
- Fate: Scuttled at Toulon 27 November 1942, later transferred to Regia Marina

Italy
- Name: FR 12
- Acquired: November 1942; 3 March 1943 (raised)
- Fate: Bombed and sank 18 August 1944, scrapped 1952

General characteristics
- Class & type: La Galissonnière class cruiser
- Displacement: 7,600 tons (standard); 9120 tons (full load)
- Length: 179 m (587 ft)
- Beam: 17.5 m (57 ft)
- Draught: 5.35 m (17.6 ft)
- Propulsion: 2-shaft Parsons single reduction geared turbines; 4 Indret boilers; 84,000 shp
- Speed: 31 knots (57 km/h; 36 mph)
- Range: 7,000 nmi (13,000 km; 8,100 mi) at 12 knots (22 km/h; 14 mph); 6,800 at 14 knots; 5,500 at 18 knots; 1,650 at 34 knots
- Complement: 540
- Armament: Initial; 9 × 152 mm (6.0 in)/55 guns (3 × 3); 8 × 90 mm (3.5 inch) AA (4 × 2); 8 × 37 mm (1.5 in) light AA (4 × 2); 12 × 13.2 mm (0.52 in) light AA (4 × 3); 4 × 550 mm (22 in) torpedo tubes (2 × 2); Vichy refit (1941); 9 × 152 mm (6.0 in)/55 guns (3 × 3); 8 × 90 mm (3.5 in) AA (4 × 2); 9 × 37 mm (1.5 in) light AA (4 × 2, 1 × 1); 2 × 25 mm (0.98 in) light AA (1 × 2); 16 × 13.2 mm (0.52 in) light AA (4 × 3, 2 × 2); 4 × 550 mm (22 in) torpedo tubes (2 × 2)
- Armour: Main belt: 105 mm (4.1 in); End bulkheads: 30 mm (1.2 in); Sides: 120 mm (4.7 in); Deck: 38 mm (1.5 in); Turrets: 100 mm (3.9 in); Tower: 95 mm (3.7 in)
- Aircraft carried: up to 4 GL-832, later 2 Loire 130 flying boats; 1 catapult

La Galissonnière was the lead ship of her class of six light cruisers built for the Marine Nationale (French Navy) during the 1930s. She was named in honour of Roland-Michel Barrin de La Galissonière. During World War II, she served with Vichy France.

== Design and description ==
The La Galissonnière class was designed as an enlarged and improved version of the preceding Emile Bertin. The ships had an overall length of 179.5 meters (588 ft 11 in), a beam of 17.48 meters (57 ft 4 in), and a draft of 5.28 meters (17 ft 4 in). They displaced 7,722 metric tons (7,600 long tons) at standard load and 9,460 t (9,310 long tons) at deep load. Their crew consisted of 557 men in peacetime and 612 in wartime.

== History ==
La Galissonnière was at first assigned to the 2nd Light Squadron in the Mediterranean until October 1937, when she formed the 3rd Cruiser Division at Toulon, together with her sister ships Jean de Vienne and Marseillaise.

At the outbreak of World War II, La Galissonnière carried out patrol duties off the Tunisian coast until mid-November 1939, when she started a major refit at Brest until the end of February 1940. She then was based at Toulon until the French surrender in June.

From January 1941, she was part of the Vichy "High Seas Force" at Toulon. Two of the three cruisers from the 3rd Cruisers Division – she and Marseillaise – never went to high sea due to lack of fuel, except in November 1940, to cover the return to Toulon of the battleship Provence, severely damaged by British gunfire in July 1940 during Operation Catapult. However, La Galissonnière was effectively disarmed and inactive.

When the Germans occupied Vichy France, she was scuttled on 27 November 1942 to prevent her capture by the Germans and Italians. The cruiser shared the drydock with Dunkerque, and her captain moved her forward and opened the sea valves so that she would sink and block the gates.

== Italian FR 12 ==
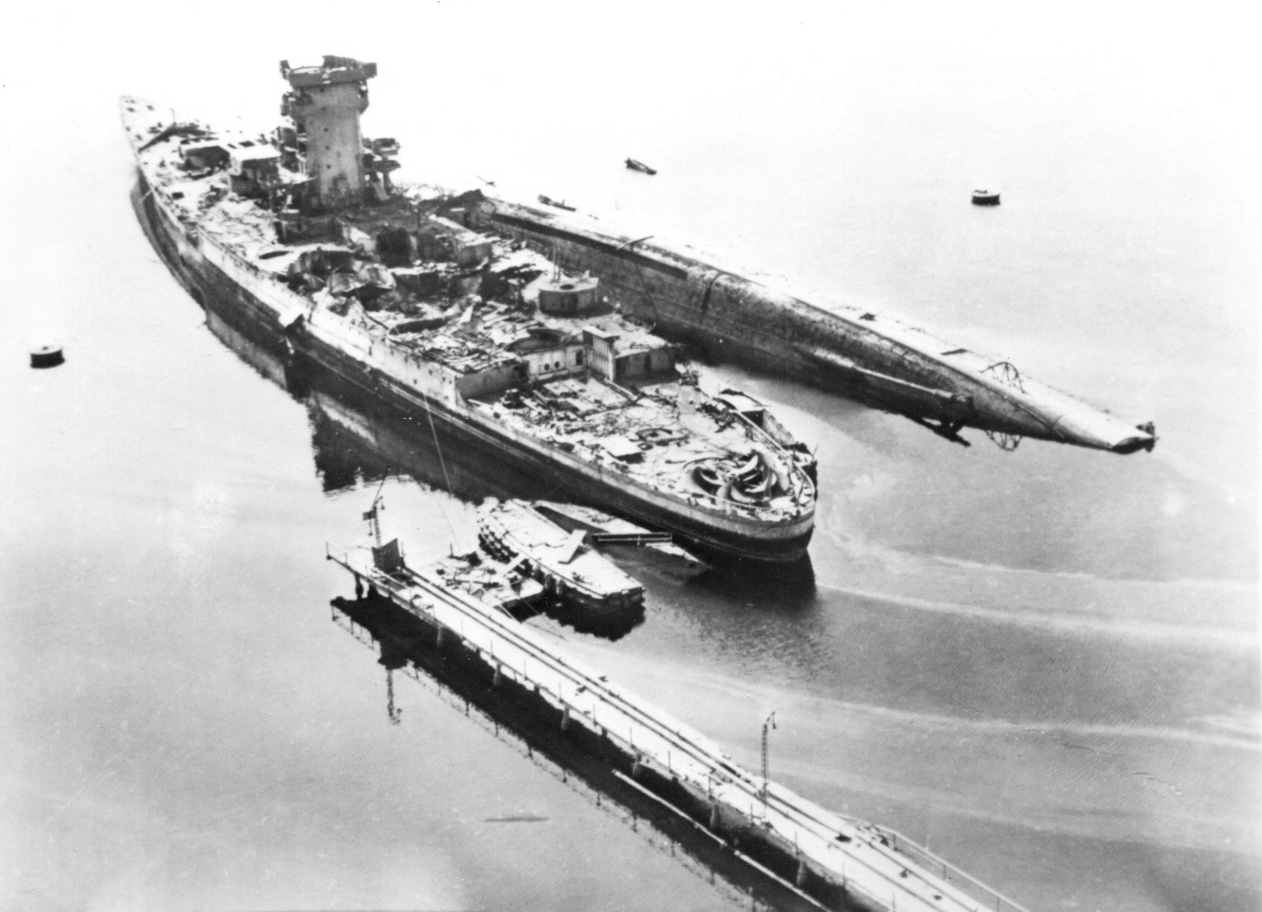
La Galissonnière capsized alongside the heavily damaged Strasbourg

Allocated to the Kingdom of Italy after some political delays, she was subsequently raised by the Regia Marina (Italian Royal Navy) on 3 March 1943, repaired and renamed FR 12. Besides La Galissonnière, Italy also obtained two light cruisers, 11 destroyers, 11 escort ships, nine submarines, and 10 minesweepers.

A refit began, but this had not finished at time of the Italian armistice (nearly 60% of the ship was rebuilt). The intention to incorporate the former French ship into the Regia Marina was, however, undermined by Italy's chronic oil fuel shortages.

While in German hands, she was damaged by U.S. bombers on 24 November 1943, after the Italian armistice. La Galissonière eventually sank on 18 August 1944 in an air raid by B-25 Mitchells of the United States Army Air Forces′ 321st Bombardment Group.

The hulk was raised and finally scrapped in 1952.

== Bibliography ==
- Roger Chesneau, ed. (1980). Conway's All the World's Fighting Ships 1922–1946. Greenwich: Conway Maritime Press. ISBN 0-85177-146-7.
- Jordan, John & Moulin, Jean (2013). French Cruisers 1922–1956. Barnsley, UK: Seaforth Publishing. ISBN 978-1-84832-133-5.
- Whitley, M. J. (1995). Cruisers of World War Two: An International Encyclopedia. London: Cassell. ISBN 1-86019-874-0.
