= French cruiser Georges Leygues =

1936 La Galissonnière-class cruiser

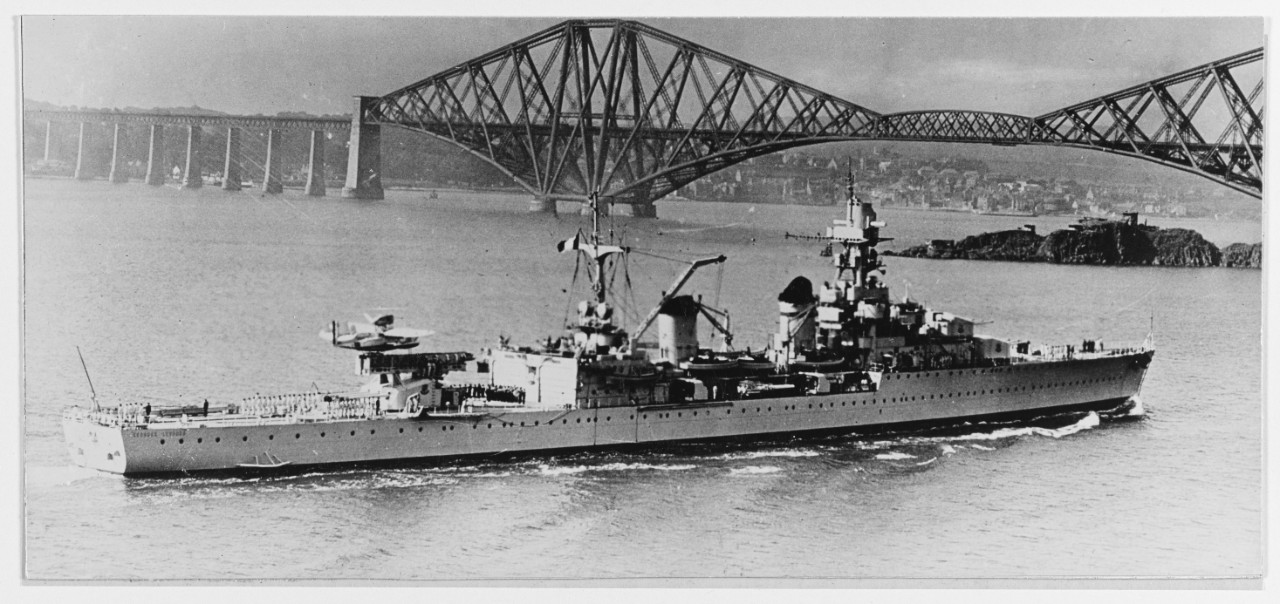
- French light cruiser Georges Leygues transiting the Firth of Forth in 1938.

History

France
- Name: Georges Leygues
- Namesake: Georges Leygues
- Builder: At.& Ch de St. Nazaire-Penhoet (St. Nazaire, France)
- Laid down: 21 September 1933
- Launched: 24 March 1936
- Commissioned: 15 November 1937
- Decommissioned: 1 May 1957
- Nickname(s): (in English) "George's Legs"
- Fate: Sold for scrap in November 1959

General characteristics
- Class & type: La Galissonnière-class cruiser
- Displacement: 7,600 tons (standard); 9120 tons (full load)
- Length: 179 m (587 ft)
- Beam: 17.5 m (57 ft)
- Draught: 5.35 m (17.6 ft)
- Propulsion: 2-shaft Parsons single reduction geared turbines; 4 Indret boilers; 84,000 shp (63,000 kW)
- Speed: 31 knots (57 km/h)
- Range: 7,000 nautical miles (13,000 km) at 12 knots (22 km/h); 6,800 nautical miles (12,600 km) at 14 knots (26 km/h); 5,500 nautical miles (10,200 km) at 18 knots (33 km/h); 1,650 nautical miles (3,060 km) at 34 knots (63 km/h)
- Complement: 540
- Armament: Initial; 9 × 152 mm (6.0 in)/55 guns (3 × 3); 8 × 90 mm (3.5 in) AA (4 × 2); 8 × 37 mm (1.5 in) light AA (4 × 2); 12 × 13.2 mm (0.52 in) light AA (4 × 3); 4 × 550 mm (22 in) torpedo tubes (2 × 2); Vichy refit (1941); 9 × 152 mm (6.0 in)/55 guns (3 × 3); 8 × 90 mm (3.5 in) AA (4 × 2); 9 × 37 mm (1.5 in) light AA (4 × 2, 1 × 1); 2 × 25 mm (0.98 in) light AA (1 × 2); 16 × 13.2 mm (0.52 in) light AA (4 × 3, 2 × 2); 4 × 550 mm (22 in) torpedo tubes (2 × 2); Allies refit (1943); 9 × 152 mm (6.0 in)/55 guns (3 × 3); 8 × 90 mm (3.5 in)) AA (4 × 2); 24 × 40 mm (1.6 in) AA (6 × 4); 16 × 20 mm (0.79 in) light AA (1 × 16); 4 × 550 mm (22 in) torpedo tubes (2 × 2)
- Armour: Main belt: 105 mm; End waterline bulkheads: 60 mm; End below waterline bulkheads: 20 mm; Deck: 38 mm (1.5 in); Turrets Face: 100 mm (3.9 in); Turrets Sides and roof: 50 mm (2.0 in); Tower: 95 mm (3.7 in)
- Aircraft carried: up to 4 GL-832, later 2 Loire 130 flying boats
- Aviation facilities: 1 catapult
- Georges Leygues Disposition de la protection

Georges Leygues was a French light cruiser of the La Galissonnière class. During World War II, she served with both Vichy France and the Allies. She was named for the prominent 19th and 20th-century French politician Georges Leygues.

== Design and description ==
The La Galissonnière class was designed as an enlarged and improved version of the preceding Emile Bertin. The ships had an overall length of 179.5 meters (588 ft 11 in), a beam of 17.48 meters (57 ft 4 in), and a draft of 5.28 meters (17 ft 4 in). They displaced 7,722 metric tons (7,600 long tons) at standard load and 9,460 t (9,310 long tons) at deep load. Their crew consisted of 557 men in peacetime and 612 in wartime.

== Service history ==
At the start of World War II, she was assigned to the Force de Raid, patrolling the Atlantic in response to German commerce raids. The only incident, however, was when the Casabianca was shelled in error. To pre-empt the potential Italian threat, Georges Leygues and other French warships were moved to Mers-el-Kebir (now Oran) on 24 April 1940.

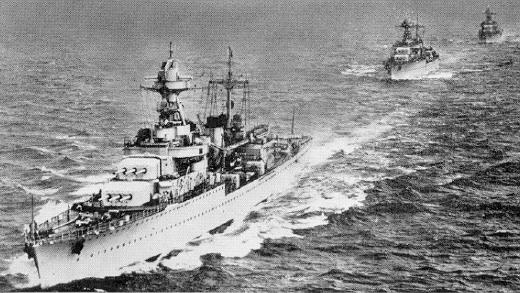
Georges Leygues in formation with sister ships.

The 3rd and 4th Cruiser Divisions, including Georges Leygues, avoided the destruction of the French Fleet at Mers-el-Kebir, and eventually put into Toulon. On 9 September 1940, she left Toulon with her sister ships Gloire and Montcalm, and passed Gibraltar without being challenged (for which the local British commander, Admiral North, was relieved of his command). The flotilla refuelled at Casablanca and continued to Dakar, arriving on 14 September.

The three cruisers left Dakar on 18 September, intending to go south to Libreville, but they were intercepted by Allied forces, including the heavy cruiser HMAS Australia. Montcalm and Georges Leygues outran the Allied ships and returned to Dakar, where they helped to defend the port against the unsuccessful British and Free French attack (Operation Menace) on 23–25 September 1940. Georges Leygues hit Australia twice and avoided Fleet Air Arm torpedo attacks. Gloire, slowed by mechanical troubles and unable to escape, had been ordered back to Casablanca.

Apart from a transport of bullion to Casablanca in August 1941, the next two years were uneventful until the Allied landings in North Africa (Operation Torch) and the German occupation of Vichy France, when she joined the Allies, as did other French warships. Early in 1943, she began Atlantic patrols from Dakar, and on 13 April, she intercepted the German blockade runner Portland, which was scuttled by her crew.

Georges Leygues was refitted at Philadelphia Naval Shipyard, from July until October 1943, removing the aircraft installations and adding light anti-aircraft weapons.

Georges Leygues returned to Dakar based anti-blockade-runner patrols. She then supported Allied landings in Normandy at Omaha Beach in June 1944 and the invasion of southern France in August. A French naval tradition says that beyond five months of campaigning, the war flag of a ship gets longer by one metre for each month spent away from France. The war flag of Georges Leygues is said to have been 60 metres (200 ft) when she entered Toulon on 13 September 1944.

She then bombarded the Italian Riviera coastline around Genoa until March 1945. This was her last action of the war.

She had a major refit at Casablanca from May to the end of January 1946. In 1954, along with Montcalm, she was used for fire support in the First Indochina War. In 1956, she took part in the Suez Crisis, during which she led a group of French warships providing fire support for Israeli ground forces in the Gaza Strip.

The ship was nicknamed "George's Legs" by the British.

== Bibliography ==
- Jordan, John & Moulin, Jean (2013). French Cruisers 1922–1956. Seaforth Publishing. ISBN 978-1-84832-133-5.
- Rohwer, Jürgen (2005). Chronology of the War at Sea 1939–1945: The Naval History of World War Two (Third Revised ed.). Naval Institute Press. ISBN 1-59114-119-2.
- Whitley, M. J. (1995). Cruisers of World War Two: An International Encyclopedia. Cassell. ISBN 1-86019-874-0.
