= French cruiser Gloire (1935) =

French light cruiser

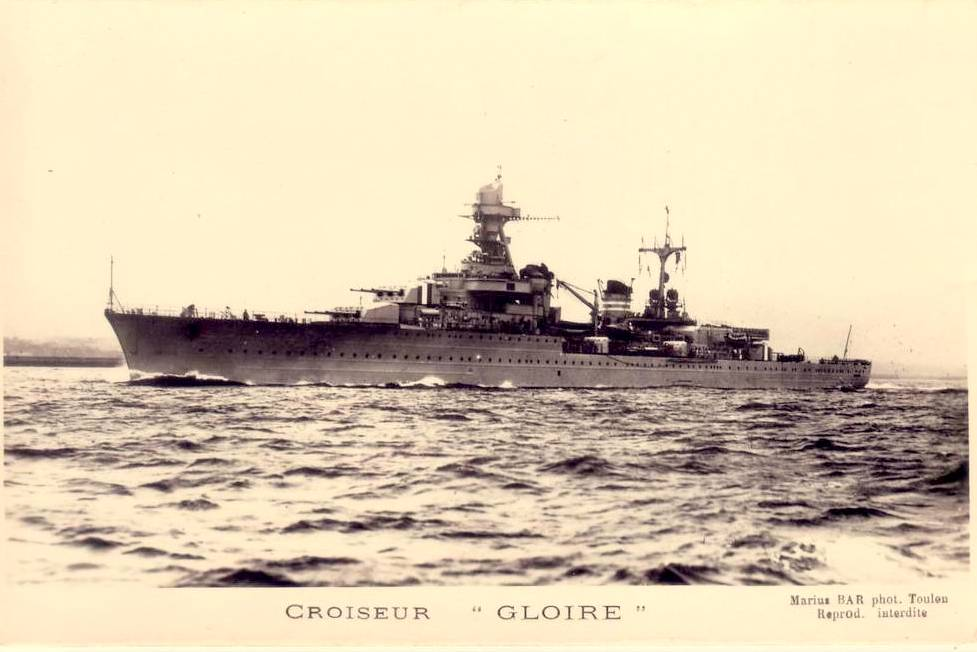

History

France
- Name: Gloire
- Namesake: Glory
- Builder: Forges et Chantiers de la Gironde
- Laid down: 13 November 1933
- Launched: 28 September 1935
- Commissioned: 15 November 1937
- Fate: Scrapped 1958

General characteristics
- Class & type: La Galissonnière-class cruiser
- Displacement: 7,600 tons (standard); 9120 tons (full load)
- Length: 179 m (587 ft)
- Beam: 17.5 m (57 ft)
- Draught: 5.35 m (17.6 ft)
- Propulsion: 2-shaft Parsons single reduction geared turbines; 4 Indret boilers; 84,000 shp (63,000 kW)
- Speed: 31 knots (57 km/h; 36 mph)
- Range: 7,000 nmi (13,000 km; 8,100 mi) at 12 knots (22 km/h; 14 mph)
- Complement: 540
- Armament: Initial; 9 × 152 mm (6.0 in)/55 guns (3 × 3); 8 × 90 mm (3.5 in) AA (4 × 2); 8 × 37 mm (1.5 in) light AA (4 × 2); 12 × 13.2 mm (0.52 in) light AA (4 × 3); 4 × 550 mm (22 in) torpedo tubes (2 × 2); Vichy refit (1941); 9 × 152 mm (6.0 in)/55 guns (3 × 3); 8 × 90 mm (3.5 in) AA (4 × 2); 9 × 37 mm (1.5 in) light AA (4 × 2, 1 × 1); 2 × 25 mm (0.98 in) light AA (1 × 2); 16 × 13.2 mm (0.52 in) light AA (4 × 3, 2 × 2); 4 × 550mm (21.7 inch) torpedo tubes (2 × 2); Allies refit (1943); 9 × 152 mm (6.0 in)/55 guns (3 × 3); 8 × 90 mm (3.5 in) AA (4 × 2); 24 × 40 mm (1.6 in) AA (4 × 6); 16 × 20 mm (0.79 in) light AA (1 × 16); 4 × 550mm (21.7 inch) torpedo tubes (2 × 2)
- Armour: Main belt: 105 mm (4 in); End bulkheads: 30 mm (1.2 in); Sides: 120 mm (4.7 in); Deck: 38 mm (1.5 in); Turrets: 100 mm (4 in); Conning tower:95 mm (3.7 in)
- Aircraft carried: up to 4 GL-832, later 2 Loire 130 flying boats; 1 catapult

Gloire was a French light cruiser of the La Galissonnière class.

== Design and description ==
The La Galissonnière class was designed as an enlarged and improved version of the preceding Emile Bertin. The ships had an overall length of 179.5 meters (588 ft 11 in), a beam of 17.48 meters (57 ft 4 in), and a draft of 5.28 meters (17 ft 4 in). They displaced 7,722 metric tons (7,600 long tons) at standard load and 9,460 t (9,310 long tons) at deep load. Their crew consisted of 557 men in peacetime and 612 in wartime.

== Construction and career ==
After completing trials, Gloire arrived in Brest on 18 November 1937, then left for French Indochina on 1 December, returning to Brest on 16 April 1938. Gloire joined the 4th Cruiser Division in January 1939, with which it visited Britain and the United States. It was refitted between October and December 1939. It then sailed for Canada with the battleship Dunkerque, carrying gold, and subsequently escorted a Canadian troop convoy on its return. Atlantic patrols as part of Vice Admiral Marcel-Bruno Gensoul's Force de Raid followed. At the time of the French surrender in June 1940, Gloire was at Algiers, but returned to Toulon on 4 July, where the 4th Cruiser Division formed part of the French Independent Naval Force.

Gloire initially stayed loyal to the Vichy French government. Free French Forces’ successes in Chad and Cameroon became politically embarrassing, and so the Axis Naval Commission permitted the despatch of the cruisers Montcalm and Georges Leygues to Dakar as Force Y. After an unchallenged passage past Gibraltar, for which the local British commander was removed, they arrived on 14 September. On 18 September the 4th Cruiser Division sailed for Libreville, French Equatorial Africa. They were intercepted by British forces. Gloire suffered machinery problems and was unable to outrun the British flotilla, so it turned back and it was 'escorted' into Casablanca by the Allied cruisers HMAS Australia and HMS Cumberland and was therefore not present during the subsequent Allied attack on Dakar.

Between April and July, Gloire underwent a refit at Casablanca, and on 12 September 1942 took part in the rescue operations after the passenger liner Laconia had been sunk, arriving on the scene in the evening of 17 September.

After the Allied invasion of north Africa (Operation Torch) and the consequent abrogation by the Germans of the armistice (Case Anton) in November 1942, Gloire rejoined the Allies. Three surviving La Galissonnière-class cruisers, based at Dakar, were refitted in 1943. Unlike its sister ships which were refitted at Philadelphia, instead it was refitted at New York. removing aircraft installations and adding light anti-aircraft weapons. Gloire then operated from Dakar together with other French and Italian cruisers, searching for Axis blockade runners in the central and south Atlantic until 16 January 1944, when it moved to the Mediterranean.

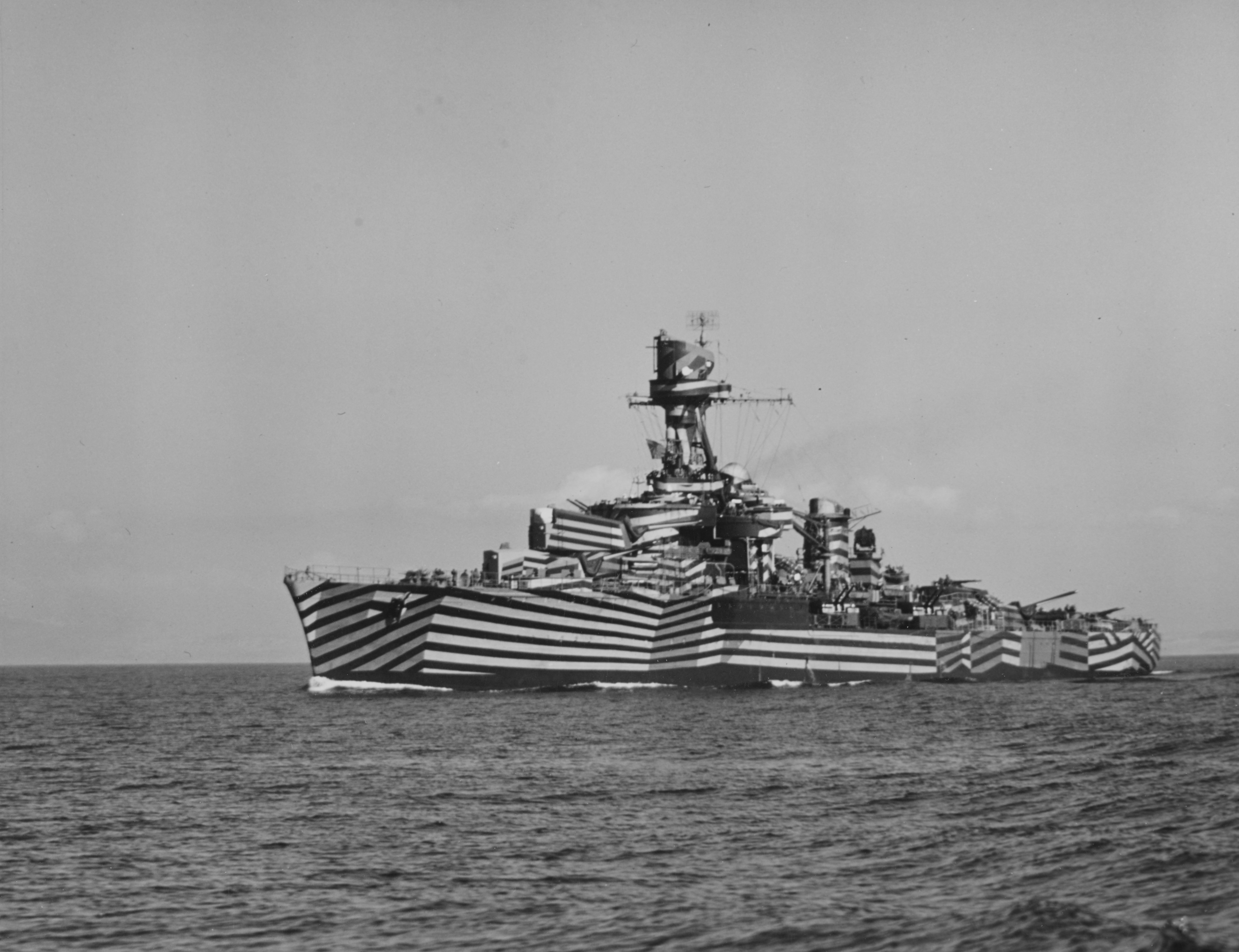
Gloire, in dazzle camouflage, off the coast of North Africa, 1944

In February, this ship supported the Allied landings at Anzio, bombarding enemy positions in the Bay of Gaeta (firing 604 rounds) and transporting troops to Italy and Corsica. After a refit at Algiers between 27 April and 17 June, it participated in the landing in the south of France (Operation Dragoon) in August, firing nearly 2,000 rounds in shore support between 15 and 28 August. Gloire continued to support Allied forces along the French and Italian Rivieras until the end of the war, except for a special trip to the United States in December.

Postwar, Gloire made three deployments to Indo-China and it was finally placed in reserve on 1 February 1955, being condemned for disposal on 2 January 1958.

== Bibliography ==
- Jordan, John & Moulin, Jean (2013). French Cruisers 1922–1956. Barnsley, UK: Seaforth Publishing. ISBN 978-1-84832-133-5.
- Whitley, M. J. (1995). Cruisers of World War Two: An International Encyclopedia. London: Cassell. ISBN 1-86019-874-0.
