= La Galissonnière-class cruiser =

1930s French cruisers

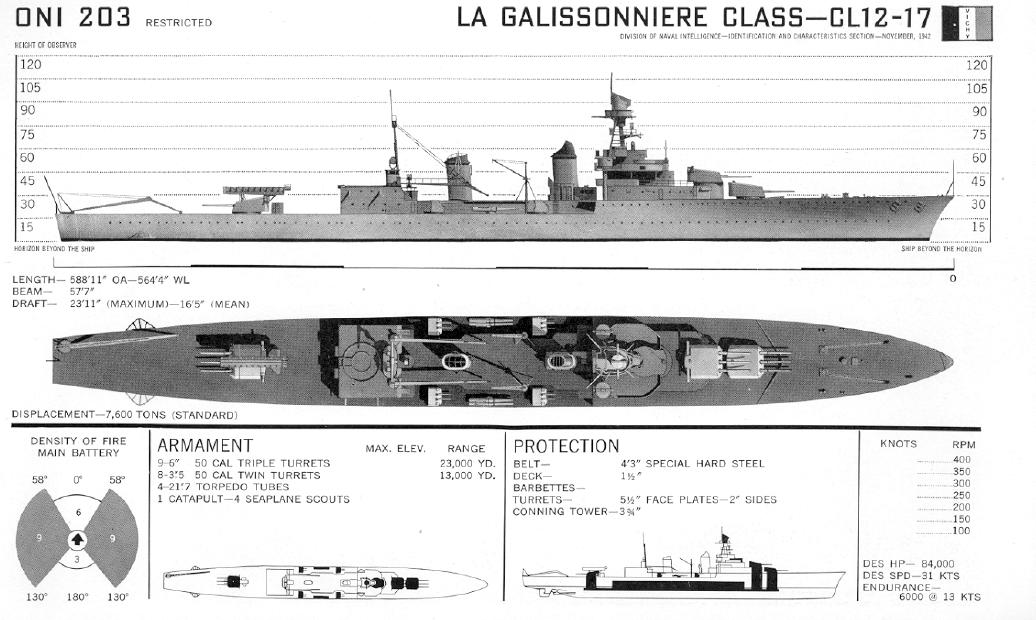
- Diagram of a La Galissonnière-class cruiser

Class overview
- Name: La Galissonnière class
- Builders: Arsenal de Brest; Arsenal de Lorient; Ateliers et Chantiers de la Loire; Ateliers et Chantiers de Penhoët; Forges et Chantiers de la Gironde; Forges et Chantiers de la Méditerranée
- Operators: French Navy
- Preceded by: Émile Bertin
- Succeeded by: De Grasse (planned)
- In commission: 1937–1958
- Completed: 6
- Lost: 3
- Retired: 3

General characteristics
- Type: Light cruiser
- Displacement: 7,600 tons (standard); 9,120 tons (full load)
- Length: 179 m (587.3 ft)
- Beam: 17.5 m (57.4 ft)
- Draught: 5.35 m (17.6 ft)
- Propulsion: 2-shaft geared turbines (Parsons or Rateau-Bretagne); 4 Indret boilers; 84,000 shp (63 MW)
- Speed: 31 knots (57 km/h) (designed); 35 knots (65 km/h) (trials)
- Range: 7,000 nmi (13,000 km) at 12 knots (22 km/h)
- Complement: 540
- Armament: 9 × 152 mm (6.0 in)/55 caliber guns (3x3); 8 × 90 mm (3.5 in) anti-aircraft guns (4x2); 24 × 40 mm (1.6 in) guns (6x4); 4 × 550 mm (21.7 in) torpedo tubes (2x2)
- Armour: Main belt: 105 mm (4.1 in); End bulkheads: 30 mm (1.2 in); Sides: 120 mm (4.7 in); Deck: 38 mm (1.5 in); Turrets: 100 mm (3.9 in); Conning tower: 95 mm (3.7 in)
- Aircraft carried: Up to 4 GL-832, later 2 Loire 130 flying boats
- Aviation facilities: 1 catapult

The La Galissonnière-class cruisers were commissioned by the French Navy in the 1930s. They were the last French cruisers completed after 1935, until the completion of De Grasse in 1956. They are considered fast, reliable and successful light cruisers. Two cruisers of this class, Georges Leygues and Montcalm, took part in the defence of Dakar in late September 1940 during World War II. With the cruiser Gloire, they joined the Allied forces after the successful Allied landings in North Africa in November 1942. The three other cruisers of the La Galissonière class, held under Vichy control at Toulon, were scuttled on 27 November 1942.

After refitting, Georges Leygues, Montcalm and Gloire took part in various Allied operations, including the Normandy landings in 1944. Postwar, several of the class acted as the flagship of the French Mediterranean Squadron, and carried out operations off Indo-China until 1954, and afterwards were deployed during the Suez Crisis and operations off Algeria. They were scrapped between 1958 and 1970.

== Background ==
The French Navy emerged from World War I with light cruisers, in very small numbers, aged and exhausted by war service. One Austrian (SMS Novara) and four German light cruisers (SMS Kolberg, SMS Stralsund, SMS Regensburg, SMS Königsberg), were received as reparations for war losses. They were renamed from Alsace-Lorraine towns, respectively Thionville, Colmar, Mulhouse, Strasbourg and Metz, armed with nine 100 mm (3.9 in) guns for Thionville, and six to eight 150 mm (5.9 in) guns for the others, a displacement of 4,000 tons for Thionville, 5,000 to 7,000 tons for the other cruisers, with a speed of 26–27 knots (48–50 km/h; 30–31 mph). They were retired from active service by the early 1930s.

In 1920 the French Navy made plans to construct 5,200-ton light cruisers, with a main armament of 139.7 mm (5.5 in) guns, capable of speeds over 36 knots (67 km/h). Funds were granted in the 1922 budget for the three Duguay-Trouin-class cruisers, known as 8000 tons cruisers, which were launched in 1923–24. They had four turrets mounting two guns each. The 155 mm (6.1 in) guns, in regular use by the French Army were chosen to facilitate a streamlined ammunition supply chain. With nearly no armour, they had a speed of 34 knots (63 km/h; 39 mph).

Also remaining in service were armoured cruisers, built between 1900 and 1910, that were obsolete when they had been commissioned. With their armament arrangement in two double turrets of 194 mm (7.6 in) guns, and single turrets and casemates of generally 167.4 mm (6.6 in), (only the Edgar Quinet-class cruisers Edgar Quinet and Waldeck-Rousseau cruisers had fourteen 194 mm (7.6 in) guns as their main armament), a speed of 23 knots (43 km/h; 26 mph), an armoured belt of 90 to 170 mm (3.5 to 6.7 in), for a displacement of 12,000 to 14,000 tons, they were outgunned by their British or German contemporaries.

=== Washington Naval Treaty ===
The 1922 Washington Naval Treaty forbade the armoured cruiser type, with clauses limiting the cruiser tonnage to 10,000 tons, and the size of their guns to 203 mm (8.0 in).

As war experience had clearly shown the importance of securing trade routes against surface threats, all the signatories of the treaty had built, until 1930, nearly only Washington heavy cruisers (fifteen each for the United Kingdom and the United States, twelve for Japan, seven each for France and Italy). These cruisers bore eight 203 mm guns in four double turrets, in the British, French and Italian navies, but nine to ten guns in the United States Navy, or the Imperial Japanese Navy, with a speed from 30 to 35 knots (56 to 65 km/h), and a very light armour, for the earliest ships built, and a better protection, with a slightly reduced speed, for the next classes. On the first Washington heavy cruisers built, in the French Navy, Duquesne, the weight of armour was 430 tons, and the maximum speed on trials reached 35.30 knots (65.38 km/h), with 126,919 shp (94,643 kW), and, for the last one, Algérie, the weight of armour was 2,657 tons, and the maximum speed 33.20 knots (61.49 km/h), with 93,230 shp (69,520 kW).

Germany was not subject to the restrictions in warship building resulting from the treaty, and the German Reichsmarine laid down, between 1926 and 1928, three cruisers of the Königsberg class with a displacement of 6,650 tons, armed with three triple turrets of 150 mm (5.9 in) guns, and a speed of 30–32 knots. In 1929, an improved unit, Leipzig, with a more powerful cruising diesel engine installation, and a more extended armoured belt, with nearly the same displacement (6,710 tons).

The British Navy considered that the Washington cruiser type was too large for its needs, and, in 1927, a slightly smaller 8 in (203.2 mm)-gun cruiser was laid down, HMS York, with only six 8-inch guns. As the 1930 London Naval Conference had just opened, the United Kingdom announced the cancellation of the next projected 8-inch-gun cruiser design, while the first unit of a new class was to be built, with a displacement of 6,500 tons and armed with eight 152.4 mm (6 in) guns, able to counter Leipzig. It was HMS Leander.

=== London Naval Treaty ===
The 1930 London Naval Treaty introduced a distinction between Type A cruisers (commonly called "heavy cruisers"), with guns over 154.9 mm (6.1 in) (the main armament mounted on the Duguay-Trouin-class cruisers) and up to 203.2 mm (8 in), and Type B cruisers (commonly called "light cruisers"), with guns of 154.9 mm (6.1 in) or under. It fixed the limit for the number of Type A units of each signatory to the number of existing cruisers, and authorized their replacement only twenty years after their completion.

In 1926, as France had started to produce classes of destroyers (Chacal, Guépard, and Aigle classes) which were superior in displacement and firepower to the destroyers of that period, in order to counter this, Italy decided to produce a new class of cruiser that would be of intermediate size between the new French destroyer classes and the cruisers built in that period. The four units of the Da Giussano class (first sub-class of the Condottieri cruisers group) were laid down in 1928, and completed in 1931–32, respecting the newly signed London Naval Treaty. On a displacement of about 5,200 tons, they were armed with eight 152 mm guns in four double turrets, and could attain the remarkably high speed of 37 knots (69 km/h), but with negligible armour and short radius of action.

A new French cruiser had been ordered in 1926 and launched in 1930, specially designed as a school ship for midshipmen. The cruiser Jeanne d'Arc had the same 6.1-inch guns, in double turrets, as the Duguay-Trouin class. But when, after the London Naval Treaty, a new cruiser Émile Bertin was designed to operate both as a minelayer and as a destroyer flotilla leader, she was armed with a completely new armament and turret layout, nine 152.4 mm (6 in) guns in three triple turrets, for the first time in the French Navy. She had two double and two single mounts of 90 mm (3.5 in) for secondary anti-aircraft (AA) artillery. Reaching 39.66 knots (73.45 km/h) on speed trials, with 137,908 hp (102,838 kW), she was the fastest of the French cruisers ever built.

The triple turret was unusual in the French Navy, which had preferred the double turret on its battleships, and on its previous cruisers, or the quadruple turret. In 1910, the Chief Naval Constructor, French Navy, had designed the Normandie-class battleships with three quadruple turrets, and the quadruple turret was broadly used, on the Dunkerque-class battleships, as the mounting for the main armament, and for the dual-purpose secondary battery. Triple turrets have been common in the Italian Navy battleships (uninterruptedly since the first Italian dreadnought built, Dante Alighieri) as in the Russian, World War I Austro-Hungarian, U.S. Navies (since the Nevada to the Tennessee battleship classes), and even in the British Royal Navy, with the Nelson-class battleships. On cruisers, the triple turret was used in all the U.S. Navy Washington heavy cruiser classes, on the Reichsmarine light cruisers, and on Deutschland-class "pocket battleships".

This was on the basis of Émile Bertin's armament, and on Algérie's protection and propulsion that was designed the lead ship of the La Galissonnière class, launched in November 1933.

=== Large light cruiser ===
The Imperial Japanese Navy, and its Pacific Ocean rival the U.S. Navy, were both interested in large cruisers, whether they were classed "heavy" or "light". In the 1931 Building Program, Japan ordered the first units of a new light cruiser class, the Mogami class, with fifteen 155 mm (6.1 in) guns, in five triple turrets, and a speed of 37 knots (69 km/h), announcing, falsely, a displacement of 8,500 tons. The U.S. Navy answered with the Brooklyn class, with fifteen 152 mm (6.0 in) guns, a speed of 32.5 knots (60.2 km/h), but a more exact displacement of 9,700 tons. The first units of this class were launched in 1937–38. The Royal Navy had laid down a class of four light cruisers, the Arethusa class, smaller than the Leander class with only six 152.4 mm (6 in) guns. They were launched between 1934 and 1936. In reaction to the building of the Japanese and U.S. large light cruisers, the United Kingdom canceled some projected units of the Leander and Arethusa classes. The two first British large light cruisers, after drawing drafts for a so-called Minotaur class, became the Town class which were launched in 1936. They were fitted with twelve 152 mm guns, in four triple turrets, and aircraft installations at the center of the ship, had a speed of 32 knots (59 km/h), and were nearly respecting the 10,000-ton displacement.

Three vessels, De Grasse, Guichen and Chateaurenault, were authorized shortly before the war as improved La Galissonnière class, with a displacement of 8,000 tons, the same armament and arrangement of three triple 152 mm turrets, two fore and one aft, and three twin AA 90 mm aft, one axial and two lateral. Aircraft installations, two catapults, crane and hangar, accommodating three/four seaplanes, would have been fitted in the ship's center, aft of a single large funnel. They were intended to have more powerful propulsion machinery, 110,000 hp (82,000 kW), to reach 35 knots (65 km/h). The silhouette, with a massive fore tower, would have been inspired by Algerie's. But only the name ship was actually laid down in the Lorient Navy Yard, and as work was suspended during the war, she was launched in 1946, and completed only in 1956, as an integral anti-aircraft cruiser design.

== Design ==
La Galissonière-class cruisers were very different, in displacement, armament, and protection from the London Naval Treaty Type B cruisers, such as the British Dido class, American Atlanta class or Italian Da Giussano-class cruisers, with a displacement of 6,000 tons or less, armed with numerous guns sometimes inferior to 152 mm, to the large light cruisers (Luigi di Savoia Duca degli Abruzzi), the Brooklyn or Town-class cruisers, (about 10,000 tons, and from ten to fifteen 152 mm guns).

With a displacement of 7,500 tons, and nine 152 mm guns, the La Galissonière-class cruisers belong to a middle category, comparable with the last Kriegsmarine light cruiser Nürnberg (an improved version of Leipzig), the Italian cruiser Raimondo Montecuccoli (from the intermediate version of the Condottieri class), or the nine-gun units of the Crown Colony-class cruisers, reduced version of the Town-class cruisers.

The displacement of French cruisers was around 7,000–9,000 tons, yet it was enough to accommodate both heavy armour and heavy armament, while maintaining good maximum speed.

=== Armament ===
The class' main armament, in three triple mountings, concentrated a powerful broadside in a relatively small vessel. Their displacement was of the 7,000-ton class, just like the Italian Condottieri III Group (Attendolo and Raimondo Montecuccoli). While the Condottieris had four turrets with eight 152 mm guns, French cruisers had only three turrets with nine guns. The use of triple turrets allowed, as on the U.S. Navy cruisers, the deployment of nine 203 mm guns, or even fifteen 152 mm guns, on hulls of 10,000 tons, or on the German light cruisers, to have nine 149.9 mm (5.9 in) guns, with less than 7,000 tons displacement.

The armament consisted of the 152 mm gun (152 mm/55 Model 1930), the only French-built gun of this caliber. The cruiser mount was the Model 1930, that displaced 169.3 tons (172 mt). The rate of fire was one shell every 12 seconds (5 rounds per min).

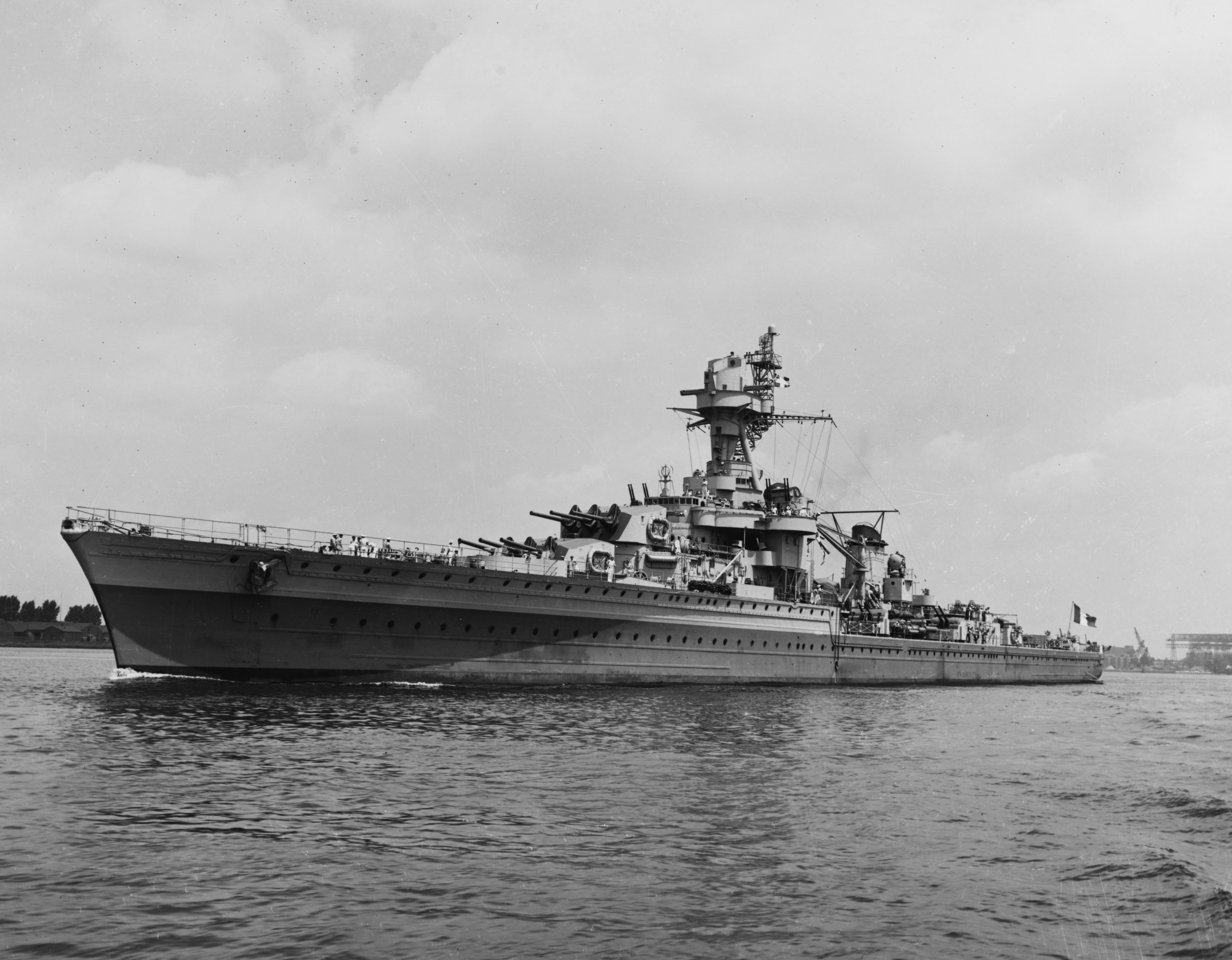
Montcalm photographed just after finishing her refit in July 1943, with newly fitted anti-aircraft guns visible

The secondary armament consisted of the 90 mm/50 cal Model 1926. It was a decided improvement over the old 75 mm guns, being mounted single or twin. La Galissonnière cruisers had four twin mounts. These ships were also fitted with two twin torpedo tubes, on sides, amidship. The torpedoes were the 550 mm (21.7 in) 23 DT model, in service since 1925. Their aircraft installations, with hangar and derrick on stern, and a catapult fitted on the top of the aft 152 mm turret, could accommodate four Loire 130 seaplanes.

Like most French warships completed prewar, they were originally weak in light anti-aircraft artillery, with four twin 37 mm guns, and six 13.2 mm twin mount machine guns. Four more were added in 1941, with one 37 mm and one double 25 mm guns, and two Hotchkiss 13.2 mm twin mount machine guns. The three ex-Vichy units received a refit, with American help, in 1943. Georges Leygues, Montcalm, and Gloire, had their aircraft installations and all their original anti-aircraft artillery removed, and were fitted with six quadruple Bofors 40 mm guns, and twenty single Oerlikon 20 mm guns.

=== Protection ===
The armour was thicker than that of many other cruisers of the time (such as the Italian Condottieri class), heavy enough to withstand opposing cruiser main batteries. The belt and deck armour was substantially thicker than usual. The Condottieri class Group III had only 60 mm (2.4 in) belt and 30 mm (1.2 in) deck armour, while La Galissonnière had an armoured belt as ranging from 75–105 mm (3.0–4.1 in) in thickness, and deck armour that ranged from 37–50 mm (1.5–2.0 in). This was enough to withstand a 152 mm round at combat range (navweaps.com gives 76 mm at 11,000 m, when fired from a British gun), while Italian counterparts cannot have done the same with their light armour, sacrificed for the best speed. Only the last group of Condottieri class was superior, with a heavier displacement of 9,100 tons (20% more than French cruisers), ten guns, and up to 130 mm (5.1 in) armour (thought to withstand 152 mm as well), but they were only two ships. In any event, these powerful ships never fought one another. The La Galissonière-class cruisers 105 mm armored belt was also thicker than Nürnberg's 50 mm (2.0 in), the Dido class's 76.2 mm (3.0 in), or the Crown Colony class's (88 mm (3.5 in)) armour, and equivalent to the Leander's. The turret protection, with 100 mm (3.9 in) on faces, and 50 mm (2.0 in) on sides, back, and roofs was also better than on other cruisers with similar displacement (31.8 mm (1.25 in) on German cruisers, 25.4 mm (1 in), on the British ones, 50.8 mm (2 in) on Town or Crown Colony classes, and 76.2 to 127.0 mm (3 to 5 in) on the Brooklyn class.

=== Propulsion ===
The propulsion was provided by four Indret boilers, and four Parsons turbines on La Galissonnière, Georges Leygues, Montcalm, or Rateau Bretagne turbines on the others, and two shafts, for a speed of 31 knots (57 km/h), with 84,000 hp (63,000 kW). They easily maintained 31/32 knots and all exceeded by far the expected trial speed of 33 knots (61 km/h). Thus, Marseillaise steamed an average of 34.98 knots (64.78 km/h) during an 8-hour trial and 35.39 knots (65.54 km/h) during a ninth hour. At the end of the war, they could still easily make 32 knots (59 km/h), on a full load displacement then increased to 10,850 tons. The endurance (5,500 nmi (10,200 km) at 18 knots (33 km/h)), was considerably better than Italian equivalents (Condottieris: around 3,800 nmi (7,000 km) at 18 knots (33 km/h)), but similar to the comparable light British or German cruisers, for the speed and radius, except the Leander and Arethusa-class cruisers, which had an exceptional radius of 12,000 nmi (22,000 km; 14,000 mi).

== Ships ==
Construction data
Name	Namesake	Builder	Laid down	Launched	Commissioned	Fate	Ref
La Galissonnière	Roland-Michel Barrin de La Galissonière	Arsenal de Brest, Brest	15 December 1931	18 November 1933	1 January 1936	Scuttled, 27 November 1942	
Montcalm	Louis-Joseph de Montcalm	Société Nouvelle des Forges et Chantiers de la Méditerranée, La Seyne-sur-Mer	15 November 1933	26 October 1935	15 November 1937	Sold for scrap, December 1969	
Georges Leygues	Georges Leygues	Ateliers et Chantiers de Saint-Nazaire Penhoët, Saint-Nazaire	21 September 1933	24 March 1936	15 November 1937	Sold for scrap, November 1959	
Jean de Vienne	Jean de Vienne	Arsenal de Lorient, Lorient	20 December 1931	31 July 1935	10 February 1937	Scuttled, 27 November 1942	
Marseillaise	"La Marseillaise"	Ateliers et Chantiers de la Loire, Nantes	23 October 1933	17 July 1935	10 October 1937	Scuttled, 27 November 1942	
Gloire	Glory	Forges et Chantiers de la Gironde, Lormont	13 November 1933	28 September 1935	15 November 1937	Sold for scrap, January 1958	

Upon completion, La Galissonnière, Jean de Vienne, and Marseillaise were attached to the Mediterranean Squadron, forming the 3rd Cruiser Division stationed at Bizerte. Georges Leygues, Montcalm, and Gloire were assigned to the Atlantic Fleet, stationed at Brest and forming the 4th Cruiser Division. The 4th Cruiser Division carried out an endurance cruise to Indochina, from December 1937 to April 1938, and represented France at the July 1939 New York World's Fair.

== Service ==
=== Phoney War and under Vichy control ===
During the Phoney War, the 4th Cruiser Division was attached to the Force de Raid under Admiral Gensoul, with Dunkerque and Strasbourg, heavy cruisers and large destroyers, first based in Brest. This squadron took part in screening Atlantic convoys, and tried unsuccessfully to give chase to German surface raiders. As Italy remained neutral in the Mediterranean, Marseillaise and Jean de Vienne took part in the shipping to Canada of a part of the Banque de France's gold reserve, in December 1939, and shipped troops in the Mediterranean in March 1940.

In April 1940, Émile Bertin was damaged by the Luftwaffe off Norway, and Montcalm replaced her, and took part in the evacuation of Namsos. In response to the increasingly threatening attitude of Italy, in April 1940, the Force de Raid was sent to the Mediterranean Sea, and the 3rd and 4th Cruiser Divisions were then based in Algiers. After Italy entered the war in June, they carried out two sorties, unsuccessfully attempting to intercept Italian fleet units.

On 3 July 1940, Admiral Sommerville's Force H was sent to Mers-el-Kébir. As the French Admiralty signalled in a radio message in clear, that the Algiers cruisers had been ordered to rejoin the battleship squadron off Mers-el-Kébir, the British Admiralty warned Admiral Somerville and hurried him to put an end to the negotiations with Admiral Gensoul and to open fire. So the six cruisers had only one thing to do, to steer for Toulon, where they arrived the day after.

Two months after, the Vichy authorities obtained permission from the German Armistice Commission to send the 4th Cruisers Division (George Leygues, Montcalm and Gloire), and three large destroyers, to Libreville, to counter the Free French Forces which had taken control of French Equatorial Africa territories, except Gabon. As the oiler Tarn, escorted by the French cruiser Primauguet had been intercepted in the Bight of Benin by British warships, and bound to Casablanca, refueling was no longer possible in Libreville, and the French cruiser squadron had to turn back to Dakar. Slowed by machinery problems, Gloire was intercepted by British cruisers, and was only allowed to proceed on to Casablanca, as Georges Leygues and Montcalm reached Dakar at full speed, and so took part in its defence against Operation Menace. Until 1943, they remained there, where Gloire joined them in March 1941: from 15 to 25 September 1942, she was sent to rescue the victims of the sinking of the British troopship Laconia, torpedoed by the German submarine U-156.

In Toulon, two of the three cruisers from the 3rd Cruisers Division, Marseillaise and La Galissonnière, the latter being replaced on 15 March 1941 by Jean de Vienne, were incorporated in a so-called High Seas Force, which nearly never went to sea, due to the lack of fuel, but in November 1940, to cover the return to Toulon of the battleship Provence, which had been severely damaged by British gunfire in July 1940. In January 1942, Jean de Vienne was sent to rescue the liner Lamoriciere, whose sinking in a winter tempest, off the Balearic Islands, caused more than 300 deaths.

After the successful Allied landings in Morocco and Algeria, in November 1942, the Germans occupied the Zone libre, and tried to seize the French warships in Toulon, (Operation Lila). But the three La Galissonière-class cruisers, La Galissonnière, Jean de Vienne, Marseillaise, as most of the ships based at Toulon, were scuttled, on 27 November 1942. In 1943, the Italian Navy tried to salvage Jean de Vienne and La Galissonnière, and registered them as FR11 and FR12. In 1944, after the Italian surrender, the Germans rendered the wrecks to the Vichy authorities, but they were sunk, following Allied bombing attacks on Jean de Vienne on 24 November 1943 and La Galissonnière, on 18 April 1944. They were both scrapped post war.

=== Allied service ===
Like all the French warships stationed in Africa and the French Antilles, Georges Leygues, Montcalm and Gloire joined the Allied Forces. Operating from Dakar, beginning in February 1943, Georges Leygues carried out patrols in the Central Atlantic. On 13 April, she intercepted the German blockade runner Portland, as the Flag Officer, French Navy West Africa, was Admiral Collinet, formerly commanding officer of the battleship Strasbourg, at Mers-el-Kebir.

In February 1943, Montcalm was sent to Philadelphia, to be refitted with American help, remaining there until August 1943. Gloire was sent to Brooklyn, from July to November 1943, and Georges Leygues, to Philadelphia, from July to October 1943. Their aircraft mounts were removed and they were fitted with modernised anti-aircraft weapons. Sent to the Mediterranean Sea, the Montcalm supported the Liberation of Corsica in September 1943, and Gloire carried out bombardment missions against land-based targets in the Gulf of Gaeta in early 1944.

Georges Leygues and Montcalm supported the Allied Normandy landings, and, together with Gloire, Operation Dragoon. Georges Leygues returned to Toulon, on 13 September 1944, bearing the flag of the Chef d'état-major de la Marine, Vice Admiral Lemonnier, her commanding officer when she had left Toulon, and at the Battle of Dakar in 1940. Until April 1945, the three cruisers were part of the so-called Flank Force, operating off the Mediterranean coast of the western Italian Riviera.

=== Post war ===
In 1945, they carried out various missions to Indochina, and after 1954, off the Algerian coast. Gloire was flagship of the French Mediterranean Squadron, in 1951–52, Montcalm from October 1952 to June 1954, and Georges Leygues afterwards, and she took part as flagship of the Intervention Force in the operations off Egypt, during the Suez Crisis, carrying out a bombardment mission against Rafah on 1 November 1956, and supporting the landing at Port-Saïd. Gloire and Georges Leygues were scrapped in 1958 and 1959, and Montcalm in 1970.

== Bibliography ==
- Breyer, Siegfried (1973). Battleships and battle cruisers 1905–1970. London: Macdonald and Jane's. ISBN 0-356-04191-3.
- Labayle Couhat, Jean (1974). French Warships of World War I. London: Ian Allan. ISBN 0-7110-0445-5.
- Le Masson, Henri (1969). Navies of the Second World War The French Navy Volume 1. London: Macdonald & Co. ISBN 0-356-02384-2.
- Lenton, H.T. (1966). Navies of the Second World War German surface vessels 1. London: Macdonald & Co Publishers Ltd.
- Lenton, H.T. (1968). Navies of the Second World War American battleships, carriers and cruisers. London: Macdonald & Co Publishers Ltd. ISBN 0-356-01511-4.
- Lenton, H. T. (1972). Navies of the Second World War British battleships and aircraft carriers. London: Macdonald & Co Publishers Ltd. ISBN 0-356-03869-6.
- Lenton, H. T. (1973). Navies of the Second World War British Cruisers. London: Macdonald&Co Publishers Ltd. ISBN 0-356-04138-7.
- Meister, Jürg (1972). Navies of the Second World War The Soviet Navy Volume One. London: Macdonald & Co Publishers Ltd. ISBN 0-356-03043-1.
- Moulin, Jean (2007). Les croiseurs français en images (in French). Rennes: Marines Editions. ISBN 978-2-915379-65-5.
- Peillard, Leonce (1974). La Bataille de l'Atlantique (1939–1945) (in French). Paris: Editions Robert Laffont.
- Watts, Anthony (1971). Japanese Warships of World War II. London: Ian Allan Ltd. ISBN 0-7110-0215-0.
