= French cruiser Montcalm (1935) =

1935 La Galissonnière-class cruiser

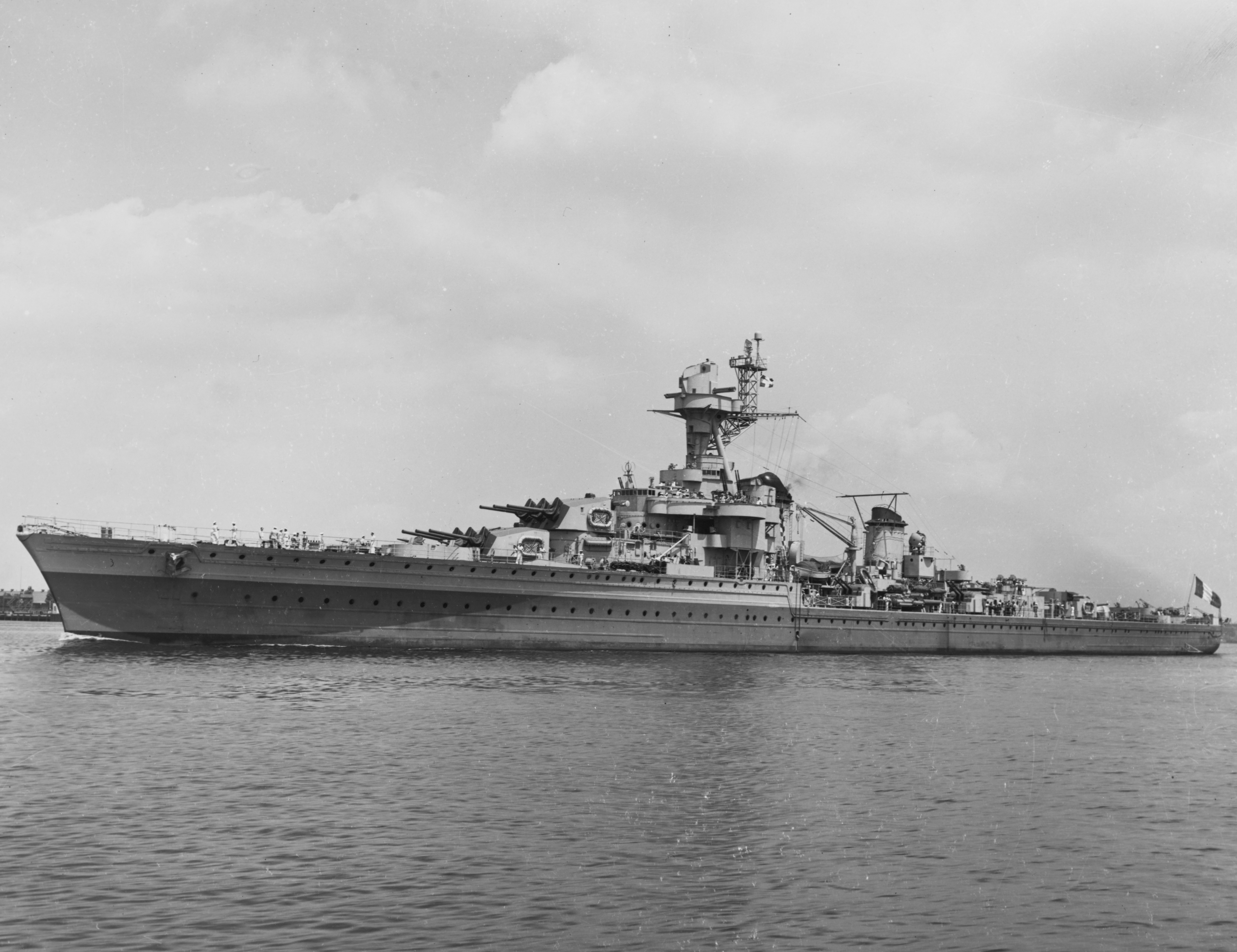
- Montcalm in 1943

History

France
- Name: Montcalm
- Namesake: Louis-Joseph de Montcalm
- Builder: Société Nouvelle des Forges et Chantiers de la Méditerranée (La Seyne-sur-Mer, France)
- Laid down: 15 November 1933
- Launched: 26 October 1935
- Commissioned: 15 November 1937
- Decommissioned: 1 May 1957
- Renamed: Q457 31 December 1969
- Fate: Scrapped 1970

General characteristics
- Class & type: La Galissonnière-class cruiser
- Displacement: 7,600 tonnes (7,500 long tons) (standard); 9,120 tonnes (8,980 long tons) (full load)
- Length: 179 m (587 ft 3 in)
- Beam: 17.5 m (57 ft 5 in)
- Draught: 5.35 m (17 ft 7 in)
- Installed power: 84,000 shp (63,000 kW)
- Propulsion: 2 x Parsons single reduction geared turbines; 4 x Indret boilers
- Speed: 31 knots (57 km/h; 36 mph)
- Range: 7,000 nautical miles (13,000 km; 8,100 mi) at 12 knots (22 km/h; 14 mph); 6,800 nmi (12,600 km; 7,800 mi) at 14 knots (26 km/h; 16 mph); 5,500 nmi (10,200 km; 6,300 mi) at 18 knots (33 km/h; 21 mph); 1,650 nmi (3,060 km; 1,900 mi) at 34 knots (63 km/h; 39 mph)
- Complement: 540
- Armament: Initial; 9 × 152 mm (6.0 in)/55 guns (3 × 3); 8 × 90 mm (3.5 in) AA (4 × 2); 8 × 37 mm (1.5 in) light AA (4 × 2); 12 × 13.2 mm (0.52 in) light AA (4 × 3); 4 × 550 mm (22 in) torpedo tubes (2 × 2); Allies refit (1943); 9 × 152 mm (6.0 in)/55 guns (3 × 3); 8 × 90 mm (3.5 in) AA (4 × 2); 24 × 40 mm (1.6 in) AA (6 × 4); 16 × 20 mm (0.79 in) light AA (1 × 16); 4 × 550 mm (22 in) torpedo tubes (2 × 2)
- Armour: Main belt: 105 mm (4.1 in); Bulkhead ends: 30 mm (1.2 in); Sides: 120 mm (4.7 in); Deck: 38 mm (1.5 in); Turrets: 100 mm (3.9 in); Conning tower: 95 mm (3.7 in)
- Aircraft carried: up to 4 GL-832, later 2 Loire 130 flying boats; 1 catapult

Montcalm was a French La Galissonnière-class cruiser, named in honour of Louis-Joseph de Montcalm. During World War II, she served with both Vichy France and the Allies. It was commissioned in 1937, decommissioned in 1957, and finally scrapped in 1970.

== Design and description ==
The La Galissonnière class was designed as an enlarged and improved version of the preceding Emile Bertin. The ships had an overall length of 179.5 meters (588 ft 11 in), a beam of 17.48 meters (57 ft 4 in), and a draft of 5.28 meters (17 ft 4 in). They displaced 7,722 metric tons (7,600 long tons) at standard load and 9,460 t (9,310 long tons) at deep load. Their crew consisted of 557 men in peacetime and 612 in wartime.

== Service history ==
=== Pre-war ===
After commissioning and trials, Montcalm was assigned to the 4th Cruiser Division at Brest. Pre-war activities included being stationed in Saigon (now Ho Chi Minh City), French Indochina for two months from January 1938. Once back in France and part of the French Atlantic Fleet, her peacetime routine included a review for King George VI at Calais in July 1938 and she represented France at the New York World's Fair, in 1939.

=== World War II ===
At the start of the war, now assigned to the 2nd Squadron of the Force de Raid, she performed Atlantic patrols and convoy escort duties and swept for the German battleships Scharnhorst and Gneisenau after they had sunk the British Armed Merchant Cruiser HMS Rawalpindi. In early September 1939, there was a major French fleet deployment to Casablanca to forestall an enemy naval attack, which was soon abandoned.

After a major refit in April 1940, Montcalm served as flagship of the French Scandinavian Force supporting the Franco-British defence of Norway (replacing the damaged French cruiser Emile Bertin) and the evacuation of troops from Namsos, Norway, with HMS Devonshire, at the end of April 1940.

Recalled to the Force de Raid in May, Montcalm was then moved to Algiers in North Africa where she stayed, performing at least one convoy escort, until the Destruction of the French Fleet at Mers-el-Kebir, when she was ordered to Toulon. On 9 September 1940, she left Toulon with her sister ships Gloire and George Leygues, and passed Gibraltar without being challenged (for which the local British commander, Admiral Sir Dudley North, was relieved of his command). The flotilla refuelled at Casablanca and continued to Dakar, arriving on 14 September.

The three cruisers left Dakar on 18 September, intending to go south to Libreville, but they were intercepted by British forces, including HMAS Australia. Montcalm and George Leygues outran the British ships and returned to Dakar, where they helped to defend the port against the unsuccessful British and Free French attack (Operation Menace) from 23 to 25 September. Gloire, slowed by mechanical troubles and unable to escape, was ordered back to Casablanca.

Apart from a deployment in April 1941 to recapture a French steamer, Fort de France, the next two years were relatively uneventful until the Allied landings in North Africa (Operation Torch) and the German occupation of Vichy France, when she joined the Allies, as did other French warships. Montcalm was refitted at Philadelphia, from February until August 1943, the engines were overhauled, aircraft installations removed and the French light anti-aircraft weapons were replaced and augmented.

Montcalm's next duty was anti-blockade-runner patrols, based from Dakar. She was allocated to the Western Task Force and supported Allied landings in Normandy at Omaha Beach in June 1944 and southern France in August. Her war ended with coastal bombardments along the Riviera coastline until March 1945.

=== Post-war ===
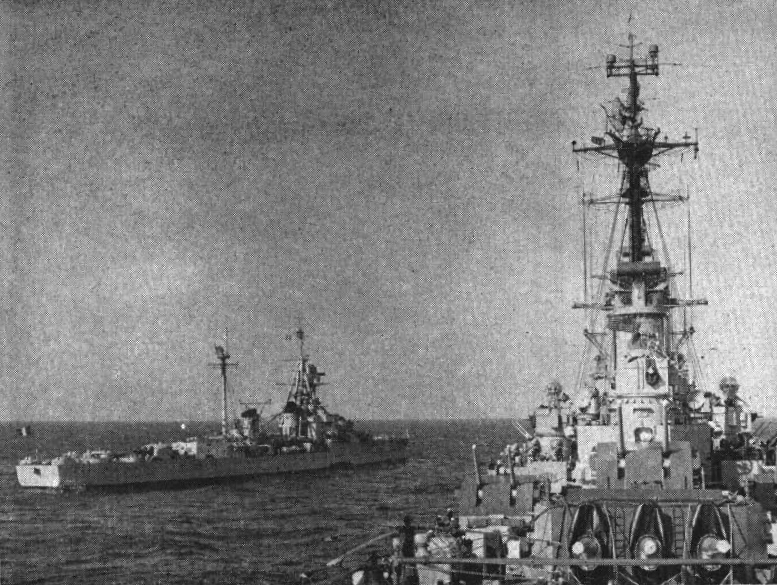
Montcalm and USS Des Moines during Exercise Longstep in 1952.

She had a refit at Chantiers de la Seyne from May to the end of January 1946, and made a tour of Indo-China in 1954.

Montcalm was decommissioned and placed in reserve, in Tunisia, on 1 May 1957. She was subsequently towed to Toulon in 1959 to serve as an accommodation hulk for the submarine school. Finally condemned on 31 December 1969, she was renamed Q457 and passed to the dockyard for disposal as scrap.

== Bibliography ==
- Jordan, John & Moulin, Jean (2013). French Cruisers 1922–1956. Barnsley, UK: Seaforth Publishing. ISBN 978-1-84832-133-5.
