= West Africa Campaign =

West Africa Campaign may refer to:

- West Africa Campaign (World War I)
- West Africa Campaign (World War II)
