= French West Africa in World War II =

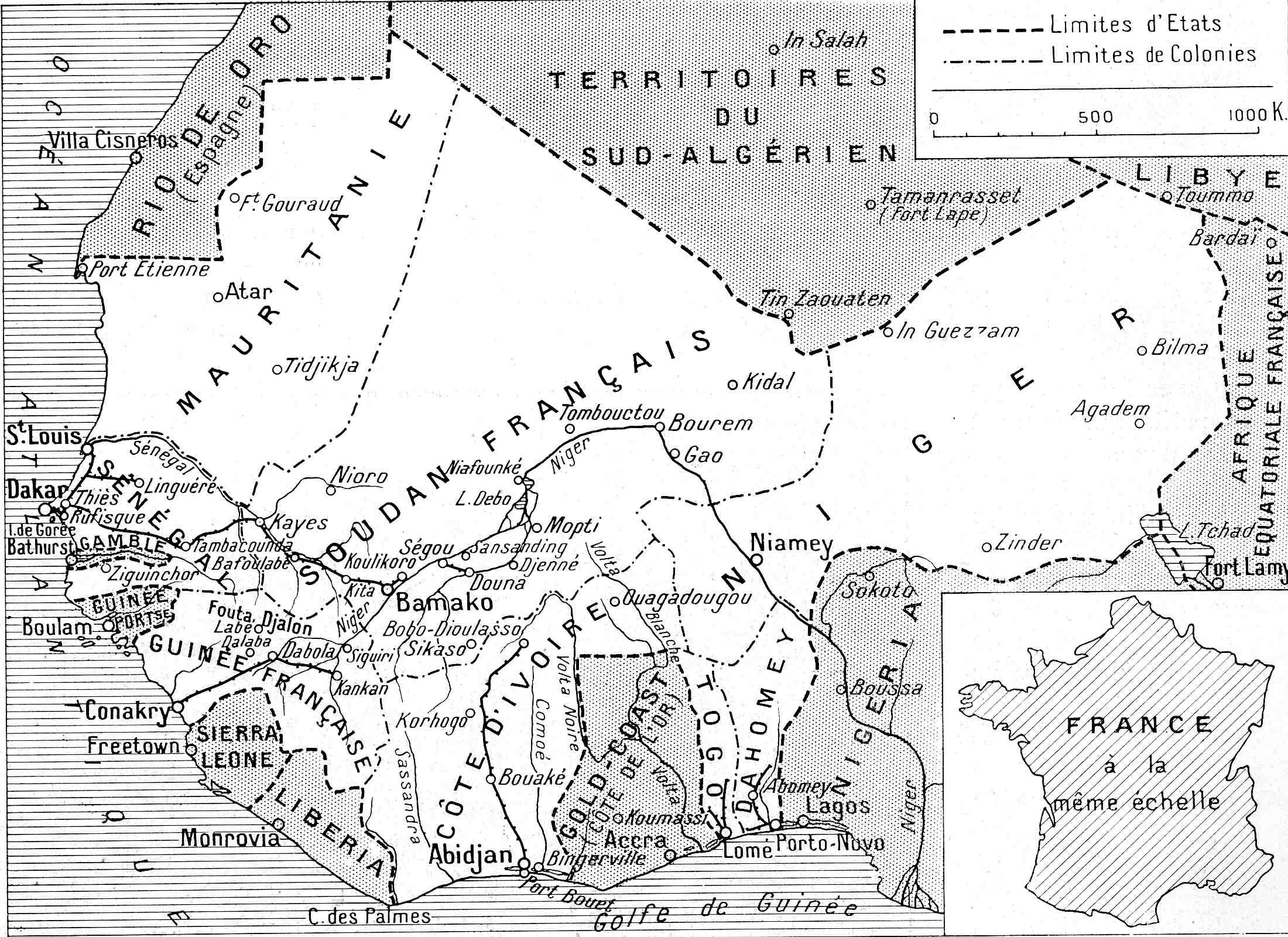
Map of French West Africa on the eve of war (1936)

In World War II, French West Africa (Afrique occidentale française, AOF) was not a scene of major fighting. Only one large-scale action took place there: the Battle of Dakar (23–25 September 1940). The region remained under the control of Vichy France after the fall of France (25 June 1940) and until the Allied invasion of North Africa (8–16 November 1942). French Gabon, the only colony of French Equatorial Africa not to join Free France after the armistice, fell to invading Free French Forces from the neighbouring colonies after the Battle of Gabon (8–12 November 1940), further isolating West Africa.

Unlike in metropolitan France, the French Colonial Troops in West Africa were not reduced after the 1940 armistice and the region was little interfered with by the Axis powers, providing a valuable addition to the forces of Free France after it had been liberated. Before this happened, there was some tension between the French and the neighbouring British colonies, particularly Sierra Leone, leading to the formation of the Freetown Defence Flight in June 1941, but no military incidents took place.

== Battle of Dakar ==
Anti-British sentiment in Africa had run high after the French battleship Richelieu had been hit in the port of Dakar, Senegal, in French West Africa on 10 July 1940. In August, Free French General Charles de Gaulle suggested an overland campaign, landing at Conakry, French Guinea. He anticipated that popular support for the Free French movement would be built in a drive on Dakar. But de Gaulle's suggestion was overruled by British desires to move swiftly.

On 18 September, three French light cruisers, the Georges Leygues, the Gloire, and the Montcalm were intercepted by Allied ships en route to Libreville. The intercepting Allied ships included the heavy cruiser HMAS Australia. The three French light cruisers were forced to retreat.

Vichy resistance stiffened as a result of the attacks on the French ships. The Battle of Dakar (23 September to 25 September 1940) took place after Allied forces failed to persuade the Vichy French defenders of Dakar to allow them to peacefully enter the city. The Allied forces first tried to persuade the Vichy forces by means of propaganda. They then attempted to take Dakar by force of arms. Both attempts ended in defeat. Allied hopes of taking over French West Africa were dashed for the time being, leading to the less developed and economically important French Equatorial Africa to be the main Free French territory in the immediate aftermath of the Armistice.

== Operation Torch ==
French West Africa surrendered in Operation Torch to the Allies armies. Dakar Air Base became an important air base.

== See also ==
- Liberation of France
- Thiaroye massacre
