= West African campaign =

West African campaign may refer to:

- West Africa campaign (World War I)
- West Africa campaign (World War II)
