= French cruiser Jeanne d'Arc (1930) =

One-off light cruiser of the French Navy

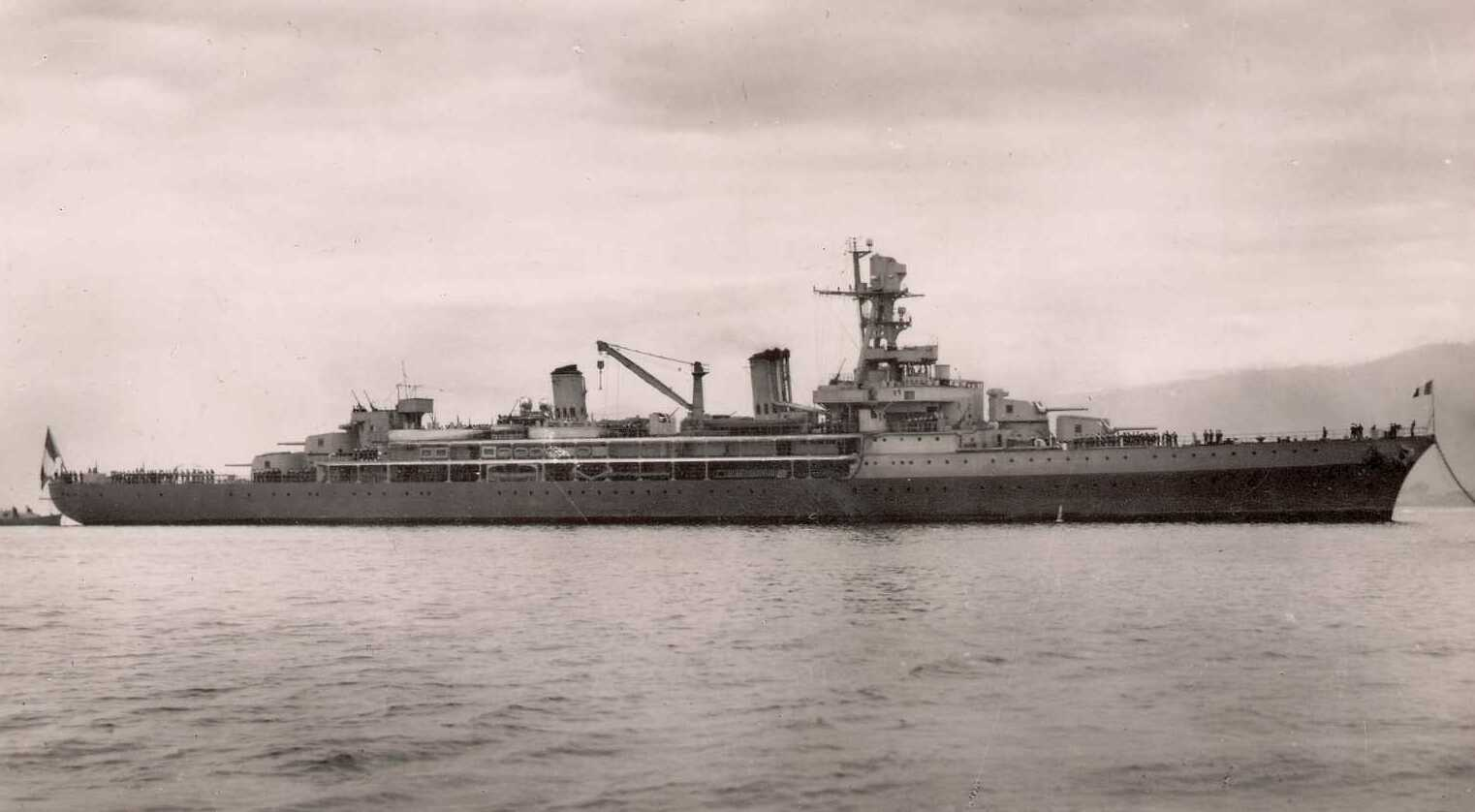
- Postcard of Jeanne d'Arc in Brest, c. 1940

Class overview
- Operators: French Navy
- Preceded by: Duguay-Trouin class
- Succeeded by: Émile Bertin
- Built: 1928–1931
- In commission: 1931–1964
- Completed: 1
- Retired: 1

History

France
- Name: Jeanne d'Arc
- Namesake: Joan of Arc
- Builder: Saint-Nazaire
- Laid down: September 1928
- Launched: 1930
- Christened: 14 February 1930
- Commissioned: October 1931
- Decommissioned: 1964
- Home port: Toulon
- Nickname(s): "La Jeanne"
- Fate: Scrapped

General characteristics
- Type: Training cruiser
- Displacement: 6,500 t (6,400 long tons)
- Length: 170 m (557 ft 9 in)
- Beam: 17.7 m (58 ft 1 in)
- Draught: 6.5 m (21 ft 4 in)
- Installed power: boilers; 32,500 shp (24,200 kW)
- Propulsion: 2 shafts; 2 steam turbines
- Speed: 25 knots (46 km/h; 29 mph) (27.8 on trials)
- Range: 5,000 mi (4,300 nmi) at 14.5 knots (26.9 km/h; 16.7 mph)
- Complement: 28 officers; 120 petty officers; 424 quarter-masters and sailors; 156 student officers
- Armament: Initial; 8 × 155 mm (6.1 in)/50 guns in 4 double turrets (2 bow, 2 aft); 4 × 75 mm (3 in) anti-aircraft guns (4 × 1); 4 × 37 mm (1.5 in) light AA guns (2 × 2); 12 × 13.2 mm (0.52 in) AA machine guns (4 × 3); 2 × 550 mm (22 in) torpedo tubes (2 × 1); Refit 1943; 8 × 155 mm (6.1 in)/50 guns in 4 double turrets (2 bow, 2 aft); 4 × 75 mm (3 in) anti-aircraft guns (4 × 1); 6 × 40 mm (1.6 in) anti-aircraft guns (6 × 1); 20 × 20 mm (0.79 in) anti-aircraft guns (20 × 1)
- Armour: Magazine box: 20 mm (0.79 in); Turrets and conning tower: 30 mm (1.2 in)
- Aircraft carried: 2 CAMS reconnaissance airplanes (removed in 1943 refit)

Jeanne d'Arc ([ʒan daʁk]) was a training cruiser built for the Marine Nationale (French Navy) during the late 1920s. She was designed both as a school ship and a fully capable warship. She saw service through the Second World War, escaping to Halifax after the fall of France and eventually joining the Allies forces before the end of the war. Post war, the cruiser resumed her duties as a training ship, being retired in 1964.

== Design and description ==
Jeanne d'Arc was designed specifically to serve as a cadet training ship. The ship had an overall length of 170 meters (557 ft 9 in), a beam of 17.5 meters (57 ft 5 in), and a draft of 5.7 meters (18 ft 8 in). She displaced 6,600 metric tons (6,496 long tons) at standard load and 8,928 t (8,787 long tons) at deep load. The hull was divided by 16 bulkheads into 17 watertight compartments. Her crew consisted of 482 and 156 officer cadets.

== Service history ==
In 1931, Jeanne d'Arc departed for her first cruise under Capitaine de vaisseau André Marquis. As a prestige ship, she toured countries of South America where France wanted to increase her influence. The cruiser visited some of the Black Sea states in 1932.

A log of the ship and the nautical calculation notebook from 1937 can both be found at the "Mircea cel Batran" Naval Academy Museum in Constanța, Romania. During that time, the ship undertook a training voyage around the Earth, and the lieutenant kept a very rich log, illustrated with photographs.

During the Second World War, Jeanne d'Arc was assigned to the West Atlantic Naval Division, taking part in blockading German cargo ships in neutral harbours. In late May 1940, along with Émile Bertin, she departed from Brest for Canada with a cargo of gold from the Bank of France, under the command of Rear Admiral Rouyer. After an Atlantic rendezvous with the aircraft carrier Béarn, the flotilla reached Halifax safely. Jeanne d'Arc then went to the French West Indies, where she remained in Martinique until July 1943.

In June 1943, Jeanne d'Arc joined the Allies, and left Fort-de-France for Puerto Rico in July. The United States refused to modernize the ship, so it continued on to Casablanca and arrived in Algiers on September 17, 1943. There the ship's anti-aircraft was modernized by the USS Vulcan (AR-5), with the 37mm guns and 13.2mm guns replaced by six 40mm L60 Bofors cannons and twenty 20mm L70 Oerlikons. Jeanne next took part in operations in Corsica and in Operation Dragoon, staying at Corsica until the summer of 1944 (and having two additional 20mm Oerlikons and four single barrel 40mm Bofors installed in May). In August 1944 she was stationed at Malta where an armored belt was installed.

The ship was appointed by Rear Admiral André Lemonnier to transport part of the Provisional Government to Normandy. She left from Algiers on 28 August, 1944 for Cherbourg, then returned to North Africa on 24 September, 1944. Jeanne was incorporated into Task Force 86 (later named Flank Force) from 25 October, 1944 until March of 1945, carrying out various objectives in Italy. The ship entered drydock in Toulon for maintenance, staying there until the war ended, after which she resumed service as a school cruiser, carrying out 27 cruises until being decommissioned in favor of her namesake, the French cruiser Jeanne d'Arc (R97), on 16 July, 1964.

== Bibliography ==
- Draper, Alfred (1979). Operation Fish The Race to Save Europe's Wealth 1939-1945. London: Cassell. ISBN 0-304-30068-3.
- Jordan, John & Moulin, Jean (2013). French Cruisers 1922–1956. Barnsley, UK: Seaforth Publishing. ISBN 978-1-84832-133-5.
- Whitley, M. J. (1995). Cruisers of World War Two: An International Encyclopedia. London: Cassell. ISBN 1-86019-874-0.
