= 25 mm Hotchkiss anti-aircraft gun =

mitrailleuse de 25 mm CA mle 39
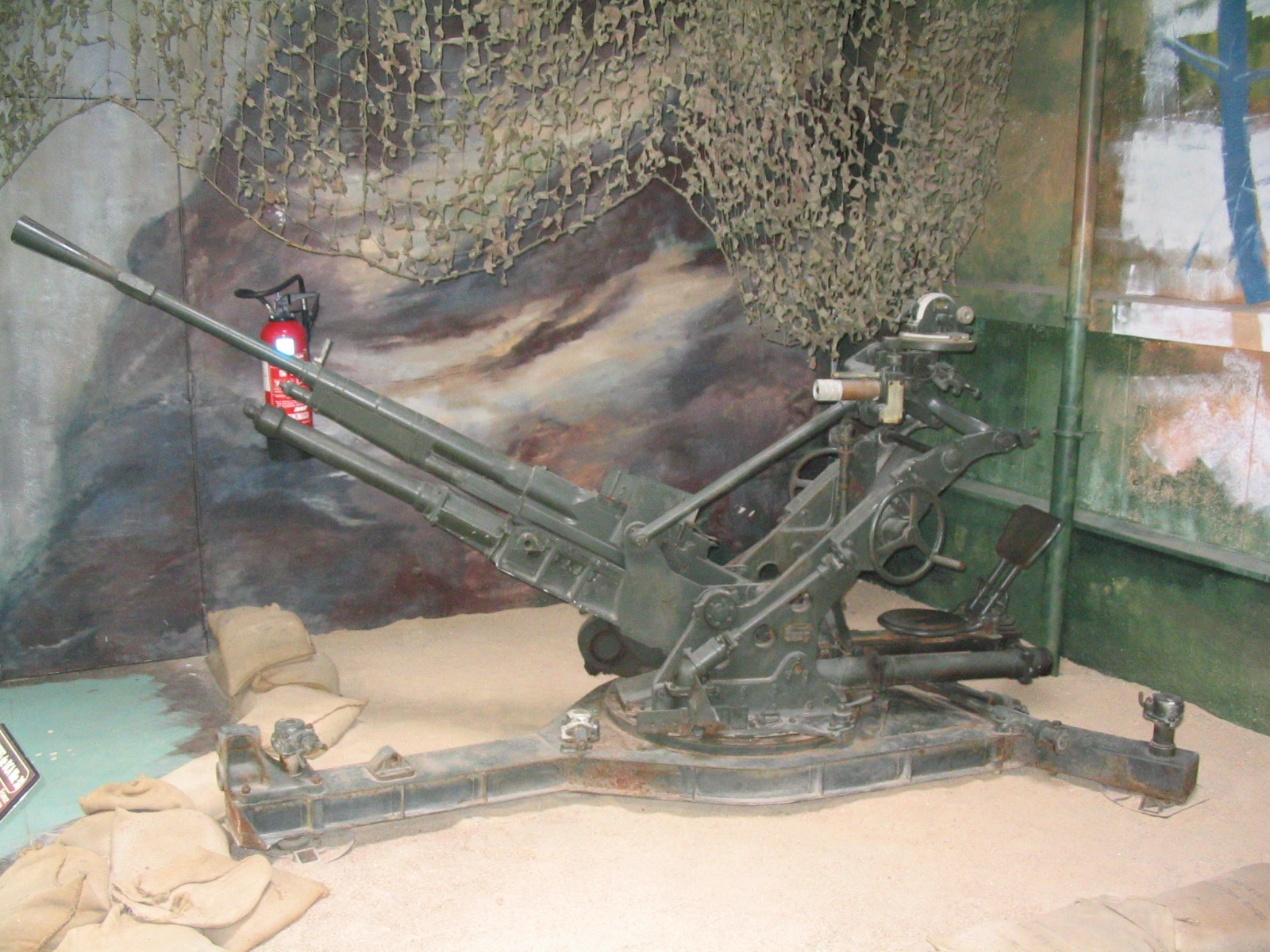
- Preserved 25 CA 39 at Musée des Blindés
- Type: Anti-Aircraft/Autocannon
- Place of origin: France

Service history
- Wars: Second World War

Production history
- Designer: Hotchkiss et Cie

Specifications
- Mass: 850 kg (1,870 lb)
- Barrel length: 1.5 m (4 ft 11 in) L/60
- Crew: 9
- Shell: 25 x 163 mm HE: .29 kg (10 oz); AP: .32 kg (11 oz)
- Caliber: 25 mm (.98 in)
- Action: gas operated
- Carriage: Two wheeled single axle with cruciform outriggers
- Elevation: -10° to +85°
- Traverse: 360°
- Rate of fire: Cyclic: 200–260 rpm Effective: 110 rpm
- Muzzle velocity: HE: 900 m/s (2,953 ft/s); AP: 875 m/s (2,870 ft/s)
- Effective firing range: 6.8 km (4.2 mi) at 45° with HE shell
- Maximum firing range: 3 km (9,800 ft) (effective); 5.5 km (18,000 ft) (ceiling)
- Feed system: 15-round box magazine

The Hotchkiss 25 mm anti-aircraft gun was an anti-aircraft autocannon designed by the French firm of Hotchkiss. It served in World War II with French, Japanese and other nations' forces. Other than the designer company and the calibre, this weapon is not related to the semi-automatic 25 mm Hotchkiss anti-tank gun; in particular, the cartridge used is different.

== Development ==
After World War I the French military expressed a need for an anti-aircraft autocannon. The Hotchkiss company submitted its 25 mm design, but it was rejected as being too slow-firing, so the weapon was proposed for export instead. In 1938, as the international situation was worsening, and the favoured Schneider 37 mm autocannon was still not ready for production, the French military decided to reconsider its refusal to Hotchkiss, who had just won a contract with Romania. The export guns were held in France and impressed into domestic service. The original tripod was found to be unstable, which led to the development of a revised variant with a triangular base with a two-wheel carriage. This new variant was chosen for mass production, but at the time of the German attack in May 1940, only a few hundred of these guns were in service. With them and only approximately two hundred Oerlikons, the lack of modern light AA guns greatly hampered the French army in the campaign.

== Foreign use ==
=== Europe ===
Romania ordered 300 pieces but only 72 had been delivered by the fall of France.

The Spanish Republic bought the weapons for its navy in December 1935. Five were received in January 1936 and installed during the Spanish Civil War in the destroyers Jose Luis Díez, Lepanto and Ulloa. After the civil war, these weapons were used during the 1940s.

=== Asia ===
Japan bought a license to manufacture the weapon, which became the Type 96 and was used on most Japanese warships of World War II. It was known officially as the Type 96 25 mm AT/AA gun. Japan was far and away the most prolific user of this design, producing 33,000 units and deploying it across their military forces.

== Variants ==
mitrailleuse de 25 mm contre-aéroplanes modèle 1938
the original tripod-mounted gun intended for Romania.

mitrailleuse de 25 mm contre-aéroplanes modèle 1939
heavier, more stable carriage.

mitrailleuse de 25 mm contre-aéroplanes modèle 1940
faster-firing variant on fixed mounting for naval and static defense use, cartwheel sights.

mitrailleuse de 25 mm contre-aéroplanes modèle 1940 jumelée
ground-based twin variant.

== See also ==
- 13.2 mm Hotchkiss machine gun, a closely related weapon
- 25 mm Hotchkiss anti-tank gun, an AT gun firing a longer round
