= French cruiser Émile Bertin =

French fast light cruiser

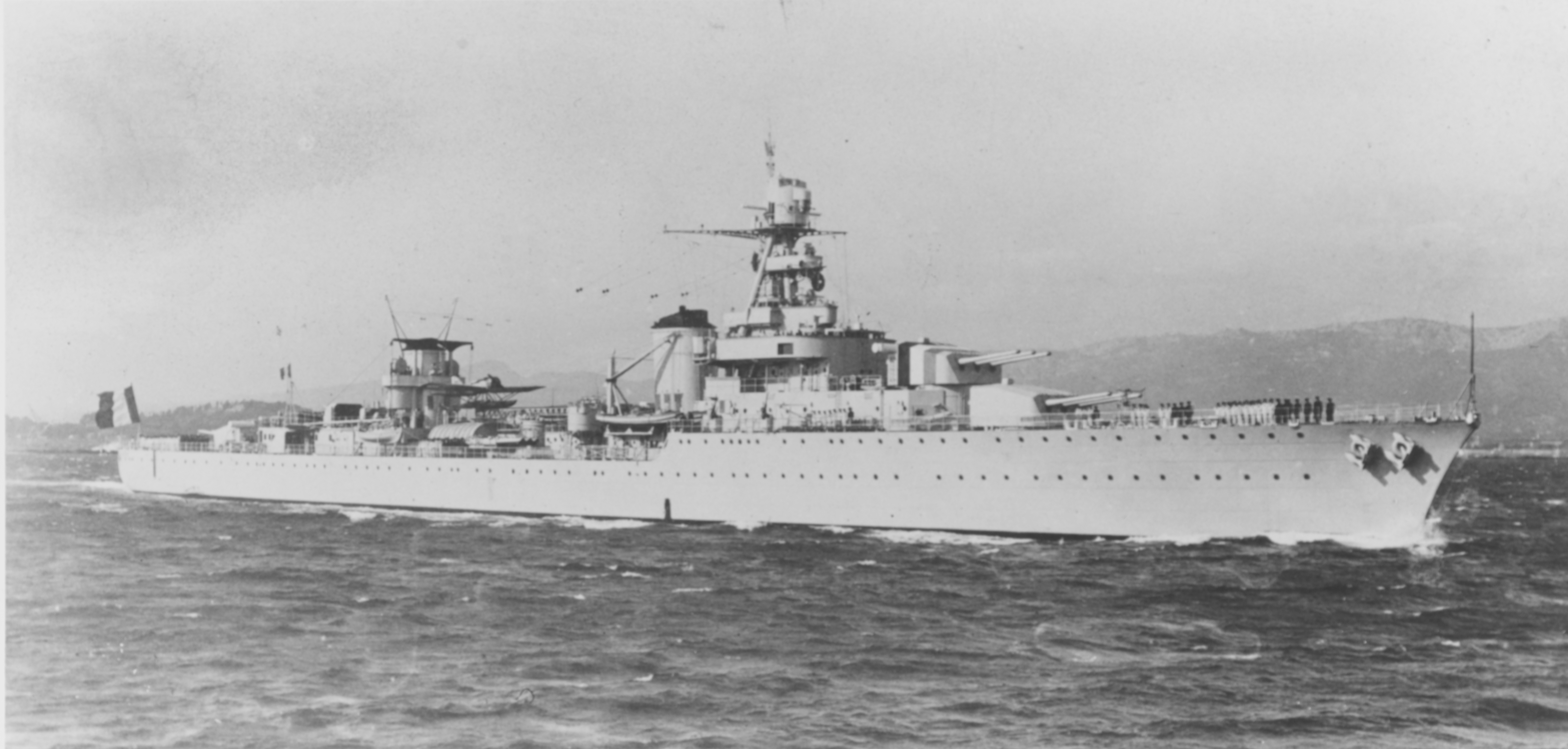
- Émile Bertin some time between 1930 and 1939

Class overview
- Operators: French Navy
- Preceded by: Jeanne d'Arc
- Succeeded by: La Galissonnière class
- Built: 1931–1935
- In commission: 1935–1959
- Completed: 1
- Retired: 1

History

France
- Name: Émile Bertin
- Namesake: Louis-Émile Bertin
- Builder: Chantiers de Penhoët
- Laid down: 18 August 1931
- Launched: 9 May 1933
- Commissioned: 28 January 1935
- Decommissioned: October 1951
- Stricken: 27 October 1959
- Fate: Scrapped in 1961

General characteristics
- Type: Light cruiser
- Displacement: 5,886 t (5,793 long tons) (standard); 6,530 t (6,430 long tons) (max load); 8,480 t (8,350 long tons) (max overload)
- Length: 177 m (581 ft) (overall)
- Beam: 15.84 m (52.0 ft)
- Draught: 5.44 m (17.8 ft)
- Installed power: 102,000 shp (76,000 kW); 137,908 shp (102,838 kW) on trials
- Propulsion: Parsons SR geared steam turbines; 6 Penhoët boilers
- Speed: 34 kn (63 km/h; 39 mph) (40 kn (74 km/h; 46 mph) during trials)
- Range: 6,000 nmi (11,000 km) at 15 kn (28 km/h; 17 mph); 2,800 nmi (5,200 km) at 20 kn (37 km/h; 23 mph); 1,100 nmi (2,000 km) at 33 kn (61 km/h; 38 mph)
- Complement: 711
- Armament: Initial; 9 × 152 mm (6.0 in)/55 guns (3 × 3); 4 × 90 mm (3.5 in)/50 anti-aircraft guns (1 × 2 and 2 × 1); 8 × 37 mm (1.5 in) anti-aircraft guns (4 × 2); 8 × 13.2 mm (0.52 in) anti-aircraft guns (4 × 2); 6 × 550 mm (22 in) torpedo tubes (2 × 3); 200 mines; Refit December 1943; 9 × 152 mm (6.0 in)/55 guns (3 × 3); 8 × 90 mm (3.5 in)/50 anti-aircraft guns (1 × 2, 2 × 1, 2 × 2); 16 × 40 mm (1.6 in) anti-aircraft guns (4 × 4); 20 × 20 mm anti-aircraft guns (20 × 1); 200 mines
- Armour: Deck: 25 mm (0.98 in); Magazine: 30 mm (1.2 in); Conning tower: 20 mm (0.79 in)
- Aircraft carried: 2 seaplanes (removed in 1943)
- Aviation facilities: 1 catapult (removed in 1943)

Émile Bertin (French pronunciation: [emil bɛʁtɛ̃]) was a French fast light cruiser named after Louis-Émile Bertin, a 19th-century naval architect. She was designed to operate both as a minelayer and as a destroyer flotilla leader. The design was the basis for later light and heavy French cruisers, particularly the slightly larger La Galissonnière class of cruisers. This was the first French warship to use triple mountings for guns.

== Design and description ==
Émile Bertin had an overall length of 177 meters (580 ft 9 in), a beam of 15.84 meters (52 ft 0 in), and a draft of 5.33 meters (17 ft 6 in). She displaced 5,980 metric tons (5,886 long tons) at standard load and 8,480 t (8,350 long tons) at deep load. Her hull was divided by 13 bulkheads into 14 watertight compartments. Her crew consisted of 543 men in peacetime and 675 in wartime; she carried an additional 24 men when serving as a flagship.

== Service history ==
=== World War II ===
Before World War II, Émile Bertin served as flagship for a flotilla of 12 large destroyers of the Le Fantasque and Vauquelin classes in the Atlantic. At the start of 1939, she was transferred to Toulon.

In secrecy, she arrived in Lebanon on 23 September 1939, loaded with 57 tons of gold - the Polish state gold reserves - and returned to Toulon on 27 September. In January 1940, after a refit at Toulon, she carried out surveillance around the Canary Islands to ensure that there were no German forces there.

After further dockyard work at Brest, in early April 1940, she became the flagship of Group Z, the French squadron supporting the Allied Norwegian campaign, with Admiral Edmond Derrien in command. As well as Émile Bertin, Group Z comprised the 2,400 t (2,400 long tons; 2,600 short tons) contre-torpilleurs (large destroyers) Tartu, Chevalier Paul, Maillé Brézé, Milan, Bison and Épervier, as well as the 1,500 t (1,500 long tons) Brestois, Boulonnais and Foudroyant.

Off Namsos, she was attacked by the Luftwaffe and damaged by bombs on 19 April. She returned to Brest for repair and remained there until 21 May, and was replaced off Norway, by the cruiser Montcalm. She made two trips from Brest to Halifax, Nova Scotia, the first with the cruiser Jeanne d'Arc and aircraft carrier Béarn, carrying gold from the Bank of France. The French armistice was signed shortly after Émile Bertin had docked for the second time, and when Captain Battet signaled the French Admiralty for advice, the cruiser was ordered to Fort-de-France, Martinique with the gold. No effort by Royal Navy units present succeeded in preventing this, but the ocean liner Pasteur, which was to follow Émile Bertin, did not succeed in leaving Halifax fast enough. She was seized and used as a troopship, operating under British colours.

Once at Martinique and the gold safely unloaded, she made ready to defend the island against an expected British attack - which was abandoned through United States pressure. From June 1940-July 1943 the ship was inactive at anchor off Fort-de-France, until, on 16 May 1942 she was ordered by the Vichy authorities to be immobilized, after pressure from the United States. She joined the Allied forces in August 1943, and was modernized in the Philadelphia Naval Shipyard. Émile Bertin later operated in the Mediterranean, took part in the Allied invasion of southern France (Operation Dragoon) in 1944 and later bombarded Axis positions along the Italian Riviera.

=== Post-war career ===
After various Mediterranean duties, the cruiser entered Toulon for a refit until October 1945. She then deployed as flagship to Indochina until 2 July 1946, when she sailed for Toulon with the cruiser Tourville. After returning to Indochina, she set sail for France, carrying the ashes of Philippe Leclerc de Hauteclocque on 4 December, 1947. Émile Bertin then moored at Toulon, serving as a gunnery training ship, a floating barracks, and finally a target ship until being decommissioned in 1952. She sold for scrap in October 1959.

== Bibliography ==
- Draper, Alfred (1979). Operation Fish: The Race to Save Europe's Wealth 1939-1945. London: Cassel. ISBN 0-304-30068-3.
- Jordan, John (1996). "Emile Bertin: Fast Minelaying Cruiser". In McLean, David & Preston, Antony (eds.). Warship 1996. London: Conway Maritime Press. pp. 53–65. ISBN 0-85177-685-X.
- Jordan, John & Moulin, Jean (2013). French Cruisers 1922–1956. Barnsley, UK: Seaforth Publishing. ISBN 978-1-84832-133-5.
- Whitley, M. J. (1995). Cruisers of World War Two: An International Encyclopedia. London: Cassell. ISBN 1-86019-874-0.
