= Canon de 90 mm Modèle 1926 =

Canon de 90 mm Modèle 1926/CA Modèle 1926
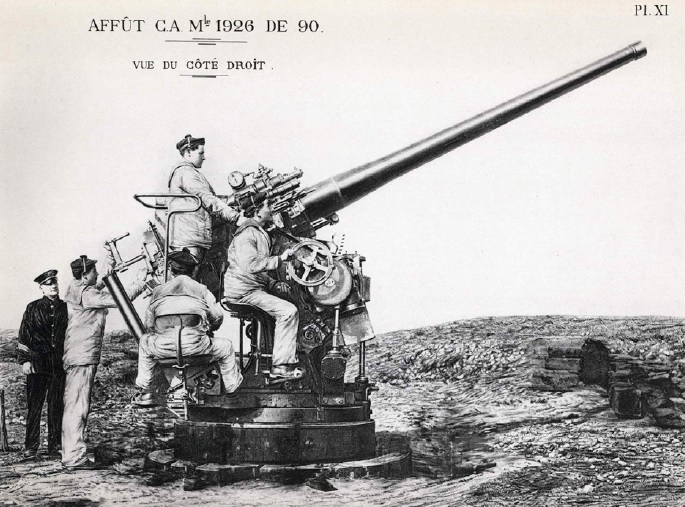
- A Canon de 90 mm Modèle 1926 on a land mount.
- Type: Dual-purpose gun Anti-aircraft gun (CA Modèle 1926)
- Place of origin: France

Service history
- In service: World War II
- Used by: France
- Wars: World War II

Production history
- Designed: 1926
- No. built: 17? (CA Modèle 1926)

Specifications
- Mass: Travel:8,570 kg (18,890 lb); Combat: 5,760 kg (12,700 lb) (CA Modèle 1926)
- Length: 8.3 m (27 ft)
- Barrel length: 4.5 m (14 ft 9 in) 50 caliber
- Width: 2.3 m (7 ft 7 in)
- Height: 2.6 m (8 ft 6 in)
- Crew: 10
- Shell: Fixed QF ammunition 90 x 674mm R
- Shell weight: 9.51 kg (21.0 lb)
- Caliber: 90 mm (3.5 in)
- Breech: Schneider semi-automatic breech mechanism
- Elevation: -10° to +80°
- Traverse: -150° to +150°
- Rate of fire: 12-15 rpm
- Muzzle velocity: 850 m/s (2,800 ft/s)
- Maximum firing range: Horizontal: 16,885 m (18,466 yd) at 45° Vertical: 10,600 m (11,600 yd) at 80°

The Canon de 90 mm Modèle 1926 was a light-caliber dual-purpose gun used as primary armament on minesweeping sloops and anti-aircraft armament on a number of French Navy cruisers and battleships during World War II.

== Description ==
The Canon de Modèle 1926 had an autofretted barrel and a Schneider semi-automatic breech mechanism. These guns were carried in single and double, dual-purpose turrets.

== Naval Use ==
Ships that carried the Canon de 90 mm Modèle 1926 include:

- Chamois-class minesweepers
- Battleship Jean Bart
- Cruiser Émile Bertin
- Elan-class minesweepers
- La Galissonnière-class cruisers
- Suffren-class cruisers
- Submarine tender Jules Verne

== Land Use ==
In addition to the naval gun, a land-based mobile heavy anti-aircraft version called the Canon de 90 mm CA Modèle 1926 was produced. In 1939 a modified — shortened by 1 metre (3 ft 3 in) — version was produced as the Canon de 90 mm CA Modèle 1939. Both were produced in limited numbers and it is estimated that only seventeen were built before 1940. Both had a two-wheeled single-axle carriage with three folding outriggers. Guns captured by the Germans were given the designation 9 cm Flak M.39(f). The gun was also supposed to be used on FCM F1 super-heavy breakthrough tank, but never passed the prototype stage.

== Ammunition ==
Ammunition was of fixed QF type. The cartridge was 90 x 674mm R with a 6.83 kg (15.1 lb) propellant charge and weighed 18 kg (40 lb).

The gun was able to fire:

- High explosive - 9.51 kg (21.0 lb)
- Illumination - Unknown
