= Canon de 152 mm Modèle 1930 =

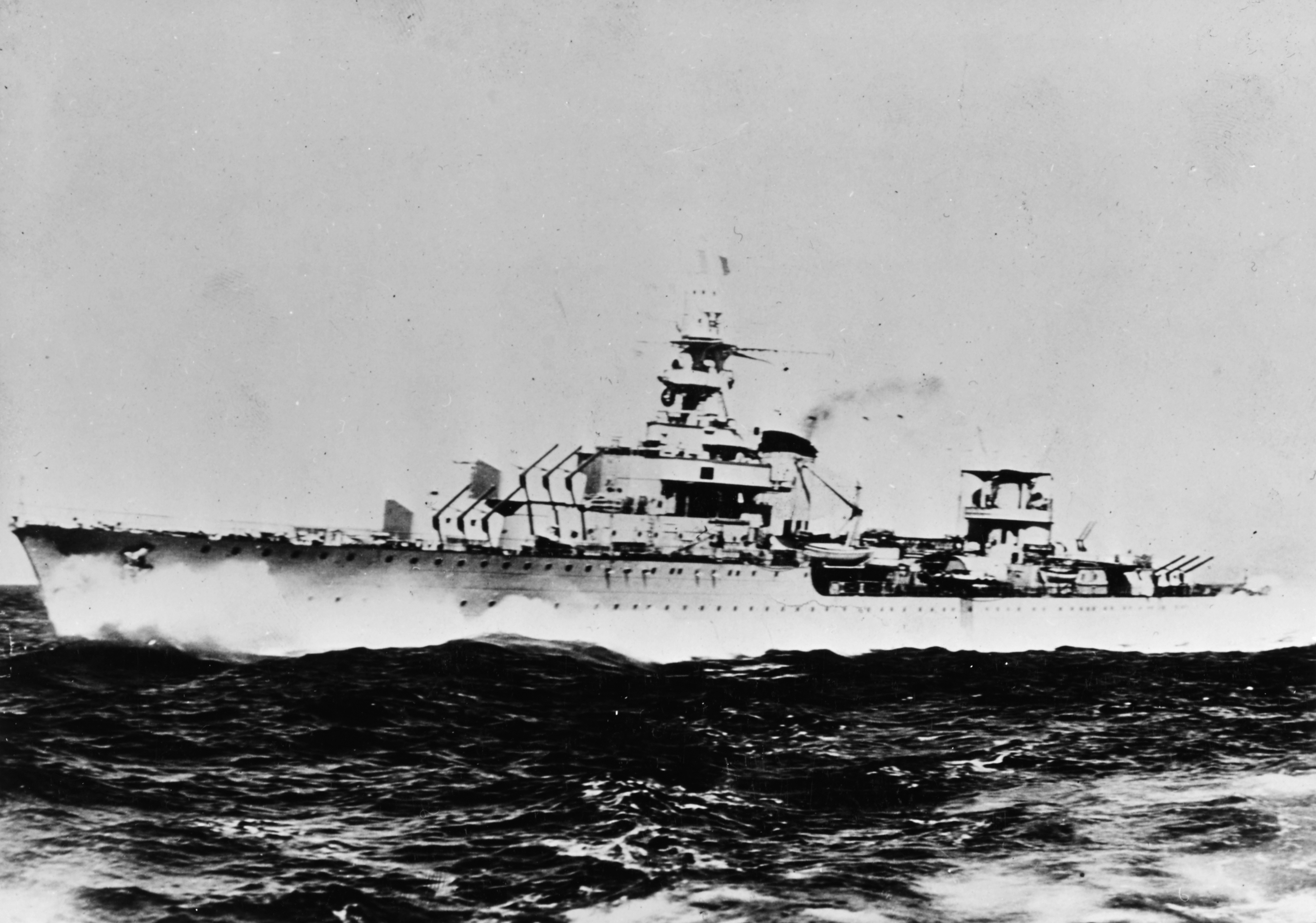
- French cruiser Émile Bertin, with its three triple 152 mm (6.0 in) guns.
- Type: Naval gun Dual-purpose gun
- Place of origin: France

Service history
- In service: 1930–1970
- Used by: France
- Wars: World War II

Production history
- Designed: 1930

Specifications
- Mass: 7.65 metric tons
- Barrel length: 8.39 meters (27.5 ft) 55 caliber
- Shell: Separate loading QF ammunition
- Shell weight: Dependent on ammunition
- Caliber: 152.4 millimeters (6.00 in)
- Breech: Vertical sliding breech block
- Elevation: Cruiser Triple Mount: -10° to +45° Richelieu Triple Mount: -10° to +85°
- Traverse: Cruiser Triple Mount: -150° to +150°
- Rate of fire: 3-5 rpm
- Muzzle velocity: 870 meters per second (2,900 ft/s)
- Maximum firing range: 26,147 meters (28,595 yd) at 45°

The Canon de 152 mm Modèle 1930 was a medium-caliber naval gun used as the primary armament on a number of French cruisers and as dual-purpose secondary armament on Richelieu-class battleships during World War II.

== Description ==
The Canon de 152 mm Modèle 1930 was built with an autofretted jacket, a breech ring and a vertical sliding breech block. Useful life expectancy was 700 effective full charges (EFC) per barrel. These guns were carried in triple turrets aboard both cruisers and battleships. The triple turrets were slightly unusual in that each gun had its own cradle and they could be elevated or depressed independently. The triple turrets on cruisers were considered successful, but the dual-purpose triple turrets for battleships were problematic and of the five turrets that were planned for the Richelieu-class only three were mounted. The triple mountings in the Richelieu-class were intended to elevate -10° to +90°, but were later limited to +85°. It was also planned that they could be loaded at any angle, but this was found to be impractical beyond +45°. The mountings slow train and elevation rates meant that they could not track fast-moving aircraft, combined with their slow rate of fire limited their usefulness in an anti-aircraft role.

== Ammunition ==
Ammunition was of separate loading QF type with powder charge, case and a projectile.

The gun was able to fire:

- Semi Armour-Piercing - 56 kg (123 lb)
- High Explosive - 49.3 kg (109 lb)
- Illumination - 47 kg (104 lb)

== Naval Service ==
Ship classes that carried the Canon de 152 mm Modèle 1930 include:

- Cruiser Émile Bertin
- La Galissonnière-class cruisers
- Richelieu-class battleships
