= Émeute =

Émeute generally refers to:

- A riot, in French

Émeute or L'Émeute may also refer to:

== Media ==
- L'Émeute, an anarchist newspaper published in Lyon in 1884

== Paintings ==
- L'Émeute or The Charge, a 1902 painting by André Devambez
