= Konga Yo =

1962 film

- Directed by: Yves Allégret
- Written by: Yves Allégret; François Gall
- Starring: Nicole Courcel
- Cinematography: Henri Persin
- Edited by: Maurice Serein
- Music by: Michel Magne
- Release date: May 1962
- Running time: 108 minutes
- Country: France
- Language: French

Konga Yo is a 1962 French adventure film directed by Yves Allégret. It was entered into the 1962 Cannes Film Festival.

== Cast ==
- Nicole Courcel as Marie
- Jean Lefebvre as Jean
- Sophie M'Bali as Angèle
- Roger Pigaut as Georges
