= Tribal Scars =

1975 collection of short stories by Ousmane Sembène

- 1971 French reprint
- Author: Ousmane Sembène
- Translator: Len Ortzen
- Language: English
- Genre: General Fiction
- Publisher: INSCAPE (US)
- Publication date: 1975
- Publication place: Senegal
- Media type: Print (hardback)
- Pages: 117 (US hardback)
- ISBN: 0-87953-015-4 (US)
- OCLC: 763705
- Dewey Decimal: 843 19
- LC Class: PQ3989.S46 V613 1974

Tribal Scars is a collection of short stories by Senegalese author Ousmane Sembène. It was originally published in French as Voltaique in 1962.

== Plot summary ==
=== Tribal Scars ===
Tribal Scars is a short story in which Ousmane presents a theory of how tribal scarring first began. It begins with a group of men sitting around a table drinking tea and discussing current affairs. When the subject of tribal scarring comes up, the table erupts into a melee of confusion, with everyone wanting to add his opinion of how the practice first started. The story that is eventually accepted by all is that African tribes began scarring themselves, so they would not be taken as slaves, and ever since then, tribal scarring has been a symbol of freedom.

== Contents ==
- "The False Prophet"
- "The Bilal's Fourth Wife"
- "In the Face of History"
- "Love in Sandy Lane"
- "A Matter of Conscience"
- "The Mother"
- "Her Three Days"
- "Letters from France"
- "The Community"
- "Chaiba the Algerian"
- "The Promised Land"
- "Tribal Scars" or "The Voltaique"

== Adaptations ==
Sembene, also a filmmaker, adapted the short story "The Promised Land" into a 1966 feature film entitled Black Girl.

== Book information ==
Tribal Scars (English edition) by Ousmane Sembène; translation by Len Ortzen

- Hardback ISBN 0-87953-015-4, published by INSCAPE
