= Len Ortzen =

English writer and translator (1912–1979)

Len Ortzen (18 December 1912 – 15 January 1979) was an English writer and translator from French.

== Life ==
Ortzen was born Leonard Edwin Ortzen on 18 December 1912. He grew up in the East End of London, and his first novel, Down Donkey Row (1938), was appreciatively reviewed by Hugh Massingham as "a picture, at once faithful and amusing, of the East End". However, his second novel was not so well-received, and thereafter Ortzen stuck to translation and writing non-fiction. In the late 1930s he had moved to Paris, and after the war he and his wife ran a guest house in Brittany.

Ortzen married Florence Anne Rowbotham (1907–1984) in 1940.

Ortzen died of cancer in Stroud, Gloucestershire, on 15 January 1979.

== Works ==
=== Translations ===
- The Sleep of the Just by Mouloud Mammeri. London: Cresset Press, 1956.
- Twenty-Five Centuries of Sea Warfare by Jacques Mordal, London: Souvenir, 1959.
- Ten Steps to Hope by Rémy. London: Arthur Barker, 1960.
- Princes of Monaco: the remarkable history of the Grimaldi family by Françoise de Bernardy. London: A. Barker, 1961.
- Napoleon's Mother by Alain Decaux. London: Cresset Press, 1962.
- The Executioners: a history of the Sanson family, public executioners in France from 1688 to 1847 by Robert Christophe. London: Cresset Press, 1962.
- Toujours Bernardette by Cécil Saint-Laurent. London: Arthur Barker, 1963.
- Lonely victory: Atlantic race 1964 by Eric Tabarly. London: Souvenir, 1964.
- Napoleon on Elba by Robert Christophe. London: Macdonald, 1964.
- The Secrets of D-Day by Gilles Perrault. London: Arthur Baker, 1964.
- Where Goldfish Go: a novel by Claude Cattaert. London: Phoenix House, 1965.
- Enrico Fermi: The man and his theories by Pierre de Latil. Edited by Jacques Ahrweiler. London: Souvenir Press, 1965.
- The Great Days of the Cape Horners by Yves Le Scal. London: Souvenir Press, 1966.
- Augustus and Nero: The secret of empire by Gilbert Charles-Picard. London: Phoenix House, 1966.
- Peoples, seas and ships in the ancient world by Zvi Herman. London: Phoenix House, 1966.
- Master water ski-ing by Gérald Maurois and Maxime Vazeille. London: Souvenir Press, 1966.
- The Bugatti story by L'Ebé Bugatti. London: Souvenir Press, 1967.
- The hunt for German scientists, 1946-60 by Michael Bar-Zohar. London: Arthur Barker, 1967.
- The Armed Prophet: a biography of Ben Gurion by Michael Bar-Zohar. London: Arthur Barker, 1967.
- Sapphira by Jacques Gall and François Gall. London: Souvenir Press, 1967.
- The Red Orchestra by Gilles Perrault. London: Barker, 1968.
- The Tangled Web by Philippe Ganier-Raymond, London: Arthur Barker, 1968.
- The Avengers by Michael Bar-Zohar, London: Arthur Barker, 1968.
- Hunters of the Arctic by Roger Frison-Roche. London: Souvenir Press, 1969.
- North African writing. London, etc.: Heinemann Educational Books, 1970. African Writers Series, no. 73.
- The Way to the Sun by Robert Beylen. Boston: Little, Brown, 1971.
- Heirs to the past by Driss Chraïbi. London: Heinemann, 1971. African Writers Series, no. 79.
- Pen Duick by Eric Tabarly. London: Coles, 1971.
- Panjamon by Jean Yves Domalain. London: Rupert Hart-Davis, 1972.
- The second death of Ramón Mercader by Jorge Semprún. London : Weidenfeld and Nicolson, 1973.
- Tribal scars, and other stories by Sembene Ousmane. London, etc.: Heinemann, 1974. African Writers Series, no. 142.
- Riders of the wind by Hans G. Kresse. London: Methuen, 1975.
- Masters of thunder by Hans G. Kresse. London: Methuen, 1975.

=== Other ===
- Down Donkey Row, London: Cresset Press, 1938.
- The Two Husbands, London, 1939.
- Rue de Paris, London, 1939.
- The Gallic Land: Country life in France, London: Phoenix House, 1952.
- Our Guests Paid in Francs, London, 1953.
- Just Across the Channel, London: Phoenix House, 1954.
- Your Guide to the Loire Valley, London: Alvin Redman, 1968.
- Stories of famous disasters at sea, London: Barker, 1969.
- Famous lifeboat rescues, London: Barker, 1971.
- Famous Arctic adventures, London: Barker, 1972.
- Stories of famous submarines, London: Barker, 1973.
- Stories of famous sea raiders, London: Barker, 1973.
- Imperial Venus: the story of Pauline Bonaparte-Borghese, London: Constable, 1974.
- Stories of famous shipwrecks, London: Barker, 1974.
- Stories of great exploration, London: Barker, 1975.
- Stories of famous survivals, London: Barker, 1975.
- Guns at sea: the world's great naval battles, London: Weidenfeld and Nicolson, 1976. Foreword by Ludovic Kennedy.
- Strange mysteries of the sea, London: Barker, 1976.
- Strange stories of UFOs, London: A. Barker, 1977.
- Stories of famous fighting ships. Vol. 1, In the days of steam, London: A. Barker, 1978.
- Fighting ships in the age of steam, London: A. Barker, 1978.
- Famous stories of the Resistance. London: A. Barker, 1979.
