= Hervé Cras =

Hervé Cras (7 August 1910 – 2 November 1980) was a French military and naval historian, who wrote under the pseudonym Jacques Mordal.

Born to a sailing family in Evreux, Hervé Cras fought in World War II, surviving the Dunkirk evacuation. He became Director for Historical Studies at the Musée de la Marine, Paris.

== Works ==
- La bataille de Dunkerque, 1948
- A la poursuite du Bismarck (18-27 Mai 1941), 1948
- La campagne de Norvège, 1949
- Cassino, c.1952
- (with Albert Vulliez) La tragique destinée du Scharnhorst, c.1952. Translated by George Malcolm as Battleship Scharnhorst, 1958.
- La bataille de Casablanca : 8-9-10 novembre 1942, 1952
- Bir Hacheim: une épopée française, 1952
- La bataille de Dakar, 1956
- (with Gabriel Auphan) La marine française pendant la seconde guerre mondiale, 1958. Translated by A. C. J. Sabalot as The French Navy in World War II, 1959.
- Vingt-cinq siècles de guerre sur mer, 1959. Translated by Len Ortzen as Twenty-five centuries of sea warfare, 1959.
- Narvik, 1960
- Dunkerque, 1960
- Les Canadiens à Dieppe, 1962. Translated by Mervyn Savill as Dieppe: the dawn of decision, 1963.
- Hold-up naval à Granville, 1964.
- La bataille de France, 1944-1945, 1964.
- Les poches de l'Atlantique, 1965.
- Héligoland : Gibraltar allemand de la Mer du Nord, 1967.
- La guerre a commencé en Pologne, 1968.
- Versailles, 1970.
- Rommel, 2 vols., 1973.
