= François Gall =

French painter (1912–1987)

- Born: 22 March 1912; Kolozsvár, Hungary
- Died: 9 December 1987 (aged 75); Paris, France
- Occupation: Painter

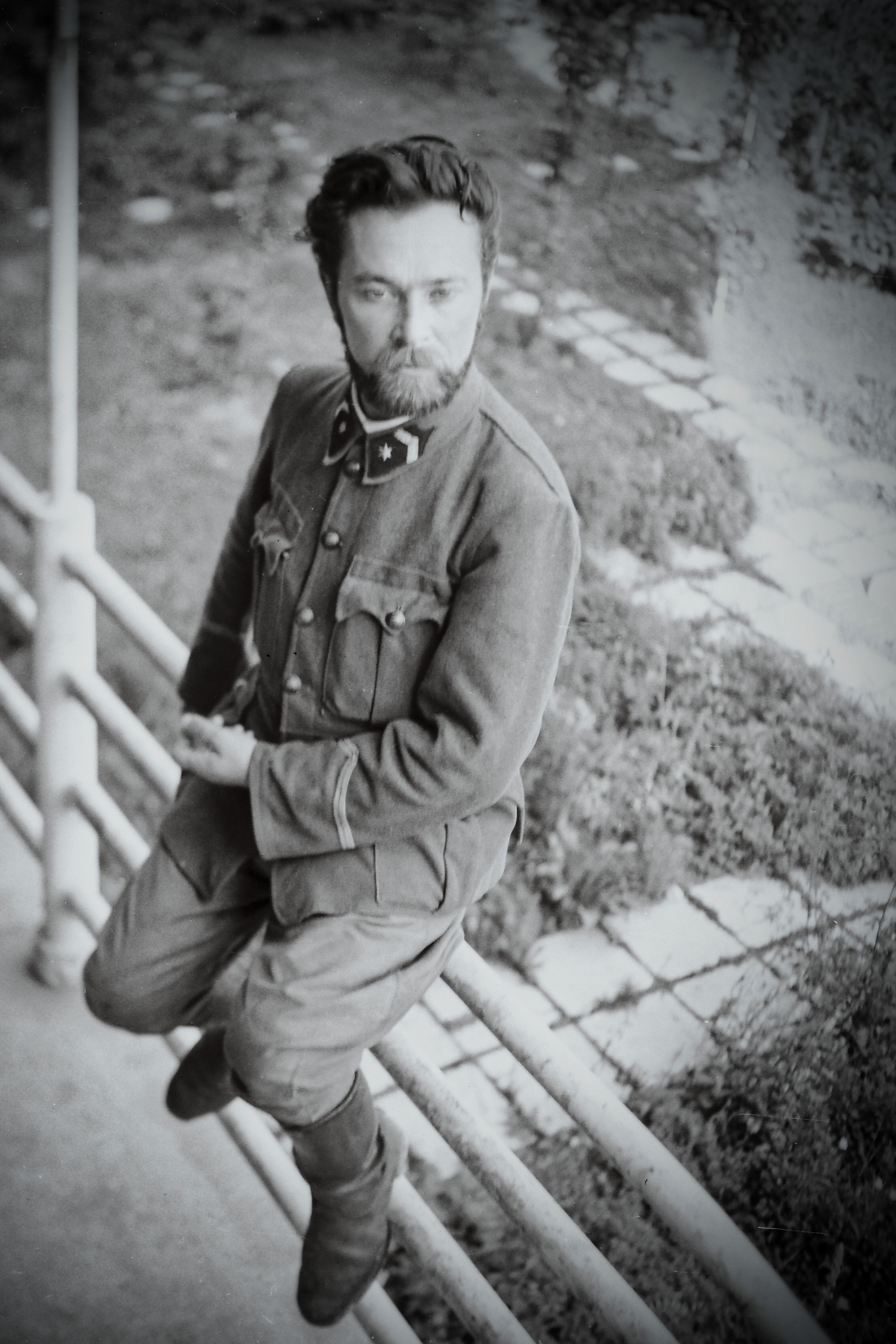
François Gall - Wels, Austria 1945

François Gall (22 March 1912 – 9 December 1987) was a Hungarian-French modern impressionist painter.

== Personal life ==
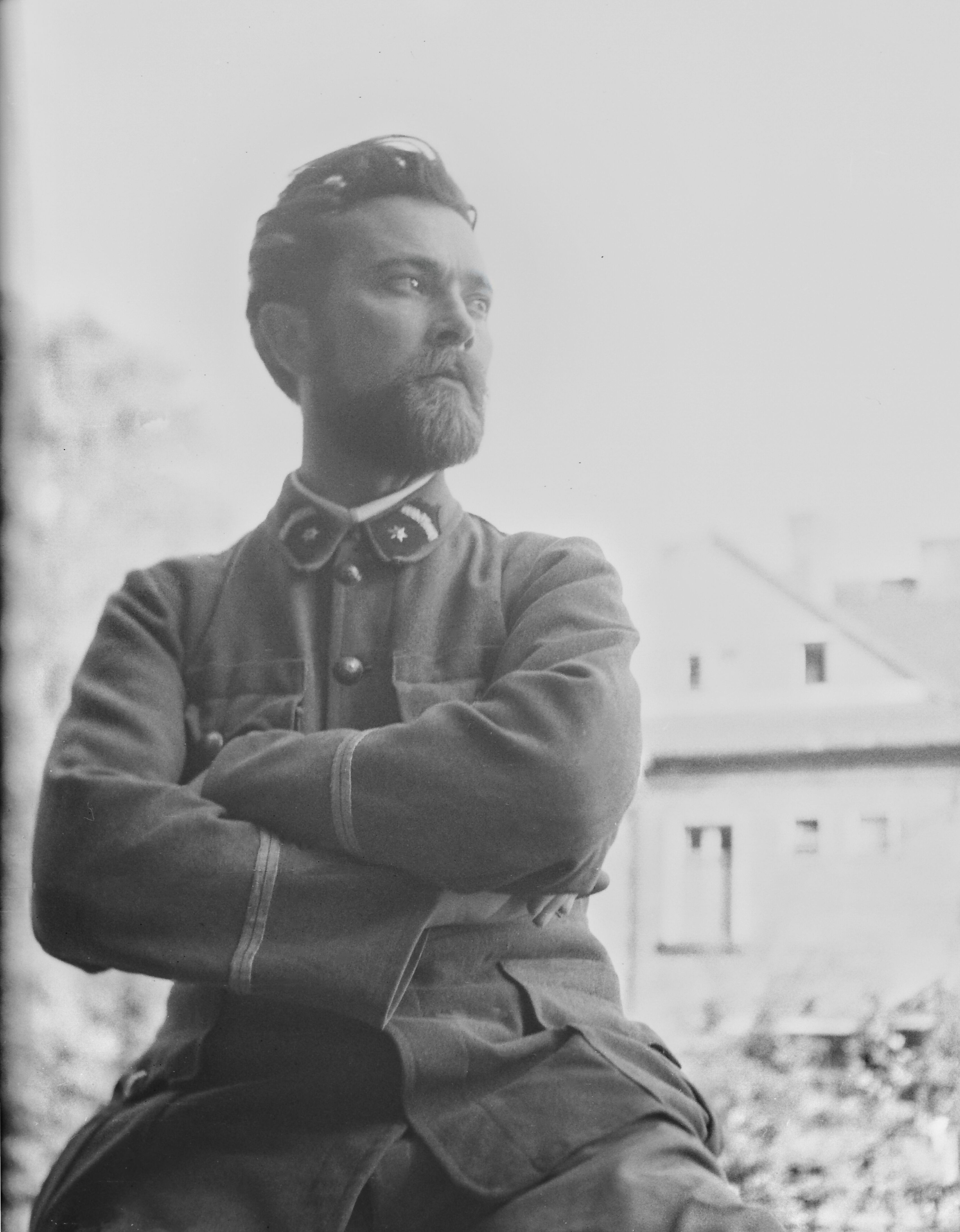
François Gall 1945

François Gall was born "Ferenc Erdelyi Gall" in 1912 in Kolozsvár, Hungary (now Cluj Napoca). In 1936, at age 24 years, he moved to Paris. Early in 1939, Gall returned to Kolosvàr to attend the bedside of his dying father. Once there, he could not return to France as the declaration of war was imminent. Gall's war time years were finished in Wels, Austria where he was a medic. He attended to Jewish people. After Austria's liberation from German occupation, Gall returned to his attic at 16 Dauphine Street, Paris and resumed his career as an artist.

In 1949, Gall became a naturalized French citizen. Gall married Eugenia Chassaing, a young woman from the province of Quercy. They had three children: Lize-Marie (1947), Jean-François (1948), and Elizabeth-Anne (1956). In 1954, the family moved to 8 Villa Brune in the 14th arrondissement of Paris. It was purchased from the widow of Jules-Émile Zingg. Eugenia and the children became subjects and models for Gall's paintings. Eugenia died in a motor vehicle accident in 1980.

In 1961, while hanging paintings for an exhibition for the Salon des Independents in the Grand Palais, Gall fell several metres and could not work for over a year. In 1987, at the "House of Artists" in Berryer street, Paris, Gall succumbed to his third heart attack.

== Education ==
Gall was tutored by Aurel Popp (1879–1960) at the Coromaldi workshop at the Royal Academy of Fine Arts in Rome He was also taught by André Devambez (1867–1944) at the National Academy of Fine Arts in Paris. He later joined the Collegium Germanicum et Hungaricum before traveling to Europe on a scholarship.

== Subject matter and criticism ==
The artist painted a very wide range of subjects in the impressionistic style. Gall was influenced by painters such as Edgar Degas. Gall painted mostly figures but also a variety of subjects including bright street scenes, portraits, still life, and landscapes. His works often featured animals. Gall's figures were often women performing everyday and artistic activities such as sewing or ballet dancing.

On 29 March 1962, Maximilien Gauthier wrote of Gall's work in The Literary News, "the Luxembourg gardens, terraces of coffee, his balls resonate July 14, while living the charm of Paris". On 10 April 1964, André Weber wrote in The Amateur Art, "Point riot of colour, no continuance, but a balanced sweet and harmonious concerto with nuances, subtleties, the preciousness palette, an incredible short refinement. From the very good and excellent painting watercolours that Israel Daniel-Mayer from what we called the "Painters Witnesses of their Time" François Gall particularly attractive distinguished by the delicacy of his paintings."

== Career ==
In 1932, Gall exhibited his work at the Galleria d'Arte Moderna in Rome. In 1936, hel joined the workshops of Charles-François-Prosper Guérin and André Devambez in Paris. He met artists including Christian Bérard, Othon Friesz, André Derain and Pablo Picasso. In the summer of 1937, Gall made an exhibition of his Parisian experience at the Szalmasy Gallery in Budapest.

In 1938, in Paris, Gall received an honourable mention for his painting, The Spanish Refugees, which was acquired by the French State. In 1939, Gall won a silver medal at the Salon d'Asnieres and received a scholarship from the Government of Hungary.

In 1947, the year of major strikes in France, Gall received a Gold Medal for his painting, Bread for the People. The Minister for Youth, Arts and Letters, Pierre Bourdan, commended the work. Also in 1947, Gall exhibited at the Barreiro Gallery in Paris. Other artists at the gallery were Fernand Léger, Lhote and Lurgat. There, he met Kisling who wanted to photograph Eugenia.

In 1948, Gall joined the group, "Free Art". He received the silver medal for his work, Exodus. It was shown at the Galerie Alexandre in Paris. His work Honfleur was exhibited at the Galerie Saint Philippe du Roule. After it was exhibited at the gallery of Paul Durand-Ruel, Honfleur was purchased by the French government.

In the 1950s and 1960s, Gall's works were exhibited internationally and a permanent exhibition of his works was curated in Bern, Switzerland. The Marlborough Fine Art Gallery in London curated an exhibition of thirty of Gall's works. The painter, André Dunoyer de Segonzac commended them. In 1951, the same gallery presented Gall's exhibition, "Landscapes of France". In the 1960s, Gall exhibited at the Salon of Painters in Paris. In 1963, he was awarded the Francis Smith prize at the Palais Galliera. With his prize money, Gall made a study tour in Portugal. The resulting works were exhibited in the Portugal House in Paris. Gall became a laureate of the Institut de France. Five forgeries of Galls works were found at the Dominion Gallery of Max Stern in Canada. They had been sourced from Eastern Europe.

== Affiliations ==
Gall became a member of the board of artists in the Ministry of Culture. He was a director of the ADAGP. In 1977, Gall was elected vice-president of the Society of Independent Artists. In 1987, Gall became president of the National Union of Painters and Professional Sculptors.

== Awards ==
- Medals at the Paris Salon
- Francis Smith award (1963)
- Gall became an Officer in the Order of Arts and Letters.

== Selected works ==
=== Portraits ===
- Edith Piaf (his muse)
- Marielle Goetschel
- France Gall
- Roland Dorgelès (this portrait was exhibited at the Salon des Independents and acquired by the French State).
- Roland Dorgeles (charcoal)

=== Figures ===
- La Lecon de Danse (Salon des Independents, 1969)

=== Landscapes ===
- Luncheon in the Park
- A Day at the Beach (1948)

== Legacy ==
Gall's works are in the collections of a number of museums and galleries. These include the Muses de la Ville de Paris, Musee d'Auxerre, Musee de l'Union Francaise a Versailles, Musees de Budapest and the Musee de l'Art Moderne de Vienne. Galleries with Gall's works include Salon d'Automne, Salon des Independants, Salon des Tuileries and the Salon d'Asnieres Galerie des Beaux-Arts.

Gall's daughter, Marie-Lize, and granddaughter, Estelle, work in the art world. In 1989, the Estelle and Francois Gall committee was convened by Enrique Mayer to administer and catalogue Gall's estate.
