= Lhote =

Lhote is a French surname that may refer to the following notable people:

- Amandine Lhote (born 1986), French canoeist
- André Lhote (1885–1962), French painter
- Henri Lhote (1903–1991), French explorer, ethnographer, and discoverer of prehistoric cave art
- Pauline Lhote, French winemaker
