= The Charge =

Painting by André Devambez

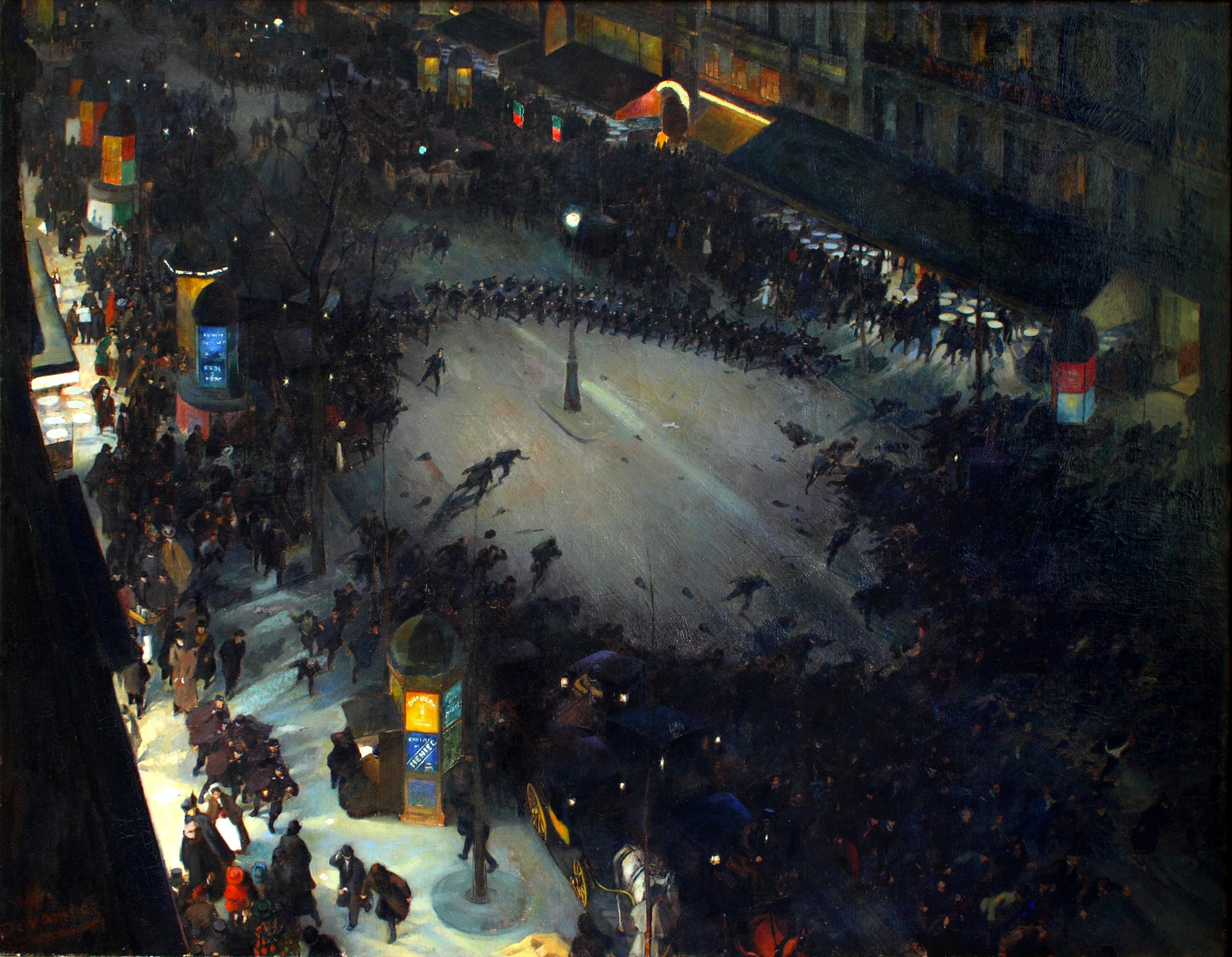
- Artist: André Devambez
- Year: 1902
- Medium: oil painting
- Dimensions: 127.5 cm × 162.5 cm (50.2 in × 64.0 in)
- Location: Musée d'Orsay, Paris
- Accession: RF 1979 61

The Charge (French: La Charge; also known as The Riot, French: L’Emeute) is a painting by André Devambez. It was probably created in 1902 and is currently in the collections of the Musée d’Orsay in Paris.

== Description ==
The painting, exhibited at the 1902 Salon, represents a police brigade charging a demonstration on the Boulevard Montmartre in Paris. The bird's-eye view, perhaps from a building, may derive something from the compositions of Monet or Caillebotte, but here it is dizzying and unsettling. Devambez’s canvas combines the modernity of urban Paris with the violence of a civil war, in a setting where modern electric illumination contrasts with a threatening darkness. The fleeing crowd have dropped hats, a stick and a bouquet of flowers in the street.

A police cordon, caught in the light of a street lamp, races towards the dark, indistinct mass of rioters in the shadows at the bottom of the frame. The contrast between light and darkness is enhanced by the contrast between the orderly line of the police and the chaotic movement of the crowd. The movement of the policemen towards the crowd along a powerful diagonal is counterbalanced by the static nature of the geometric motifs—the verticality of the lampposts and the empty circle in the center of the painting.

Devambez had painted or drawn a number of confrontations between crowds and the forces of order, including from the Paris Commune, and also illustrated scenes from the Russo-Japanese War for L'Illustration.

== Interpretation ==
The painting depicts a confrontation between the police and demonstrators. The demonstrators’ cause is not identified; given the date they could possibly be anarchists or trade unionists, but might equally well may be nationalists or opponents of Dreyfus. Devambez provides no visual indication of what the confrontation is about.

One view is that in this painting, Devambez does not take sides. Rather, the main characteristic of the work is the artist’s detachment from any cause, depicting highly political events with neutrality. Richard Thomson argues however that the lack of order in the crowd implies its irrational nature, while the police force represent social discipline, and the street, with its cafés open and its citizens behaving normally, is a rational place where rationality is being restored.

The painting was hung for a long time in the office of the police prefect Jean Chiappe (1927-1934), a promoter of order and a specialist in the repression of street demonstrations.

== Provenance ==
Devambez originally sold the painting to a private collector, Georges Lévy, who then gave it to Jean Chiappe for his own collection. It was later acquired by the Galerie Plantin-Blondel in Paris. In 1979 it was acquired by the national museums of France, assigned to the Louvre and allocated to the Musée d’Orsay.

== Exhibition history ==
- Salon de la Société des artistes français - Galeries nationales du Grand Palais - Paris, France 1902, N°523
- Panama Pacific International Exposition - San Francisco, USA 1915
- La modernité - Collections du musée d'Orsay - Tokyo Metropolitan Art Museum - Tokyo, Japan 1996
- La modernité - Collections du musée d'Orsay - Kobe City Museum - Kobe, Japan 1996
- Nuit des musées - musée d'Orsay - Paris, France 2005
- Bilder einer Metropole. Die Impressionisten in Paris - Museum Folkwang - Essen, Germany 2010-2011
- Paris au temps des impressionnistes, 1848-1914. Les chefs-d'oeuvre du musée d'Orsay à l'Hôtel de Ville - Hôtel de Ville, Paris, France 2011
- El placer y el orden - Museo Nacional de Arte - Mexico City, Mexico, 2012-2013
- Jewel City: Art from the Panama-Pacific International Exposition - de Young Museum - San Francisco, USA 2015-2016, n°145
- Gut · Wahr · Schön. Meisterwerke des Pariser Salons aus dem Musée d'Orsay - Kunsthalle der Hypo-Kulturstiftung - Munich, Germany 2017-2018
- Nuits électriques - Dans le cadre du festival Normandie impressionniste - musée Malraux - Le Havre, France 2020
- Enfin le cinéma! Arts, images et spectacles en France (1833-1907) - musée d'Orsay - Paris, France 2021-2022
- André Devambez. Vertiges de l'imagination - musée des Beaux-Arts - Rennes, France, 2022
- André Devambez. Vertiges de l'imagination - Petit Palais - Musée des Beaux-Arts de la Ville de Paris - Paris, France 2022
- L'art est dans la rue - musée d'Orsay - Paris, France 2025

== Reproduction ==
The painting was reproduced lithographically by Devambez himself early in the 20th century.
