= Pierre de Latil =

Pierre de Latil (1903–2001) was a French science journalist known for his popular science works, but also as an author of youth literature. He died in 2001.

In 1953 he authored of one of the first introductory works on cybernetics. He co-authored several essays with Jacques Bergier.

He was a scientific columnist at Le Figaro and president of the AJSPI (Association des journalistes scientifiques de la presse d’information - the Association of Science Journalists of the News Press) in 1968.

== Works ==
- de Latil, Pierre (translated by Y.M. Golla) (1957). Thinking by Machine: A Study of Cybernetics. Boston, Houghton Mifflin Company.
  - Original:Pierre de Latil (1953). La Pensée artificielle. Paris: Gallimard.
